= Istrian dialect =

Slovene dialect spoken in Slovene Istra and south of Trieste in Italy

- ˈiːstərskȯ naˈriːečje
- Pronunciation: [ˈiːstəɾskʊ͈ naˈɾiːɛt͡ʃi̯ɛ]
- Native to: Slovenia, Italy, Croatia
- Region: Slovene Istria, municipalities of Muggia and San Dorligo della Valle
- Ethnicity: Slovenes
- Language family: Indo-European: Balto-Slavic; Slavic; South Slavic; Western South Slavic; Slovene; Littoral dialect group; Istrian dialect
- Dialects: Rižana subdialect; Šavrin Hills subdialect

Language codes
- ISO 639-3: –
- Istrian dialect

The Istrian dialect (Slovene: istrsko narečje [ˈíːstəɾskɔ naˈɾéːt͡ʃjɛ], istrščina) is a Slovene dialect spoken in Slovene Istria, as well as some settlements in Italy and Croatia. The dialect borders the Inner Carniolan dialect to the north and northeast, the Southern Chakavian and Buzet dialects to the south, the Southwestern Istrian dialect to the southeast, and the Čičarija dialect to the east. The dialect belongs to the Littoral dialect group, and it evolved from Lower Carniolan dialect base.

== Geographical distribution ==
The dialect is spoken in Slovene Istria in most of the rural areas of the municipalities of Koper (Italian: Capodistria), Izola (Isola), Ankaran (Ancarano), and Piran (Pirano), as well as by the Slovenes living in the Italian municipalities of Muggia (Slovene: Milje) and San Dorligo della Valle (Dolina), in the southern suburbs of Trieste (Trst)—Servola (Škedenj) and Cattinara (Katinara)—and the Croatian villages of Slum and Brest. Notable settlements include Koper, Izola, Ankaran, Strunjan (Italian: Strugnano), Piran, Portorož (Portorose), Dragonja (Dragogna), Vanganel, Marezige, Dekani, Spodnje Škofije, and Črni Kal in Slovenia, and Muggia, Stramare (Slovene: Štramar), San Dorligo della Valle, and Trieste in Italy.

== Accentul changes ==
The Istrian dialect has lost pitch accent on both long and short vowels, and the Šavrin Hills subdialect has lost differentiation between long and short vowels completely, whereas the Rižana subdialect is in the late stages of losing differentiation. It has undergone the *ženȁ → *žèna, *məglȁ → *mə̀gla, *visȍk → vìsok, *ropotȁt → *ròpotat, and (partially) *sěnȏ / *prosȏ → *sě̀no / *pròso (e.g., ˈsiːenȯ) shifts.

== Phonology ==
The dialect's phonology is in many aspects very close to the Inner Carniolan dialect, but in some features it barely shows similarities with other dialects from the Lower Carniolan dialect base. The greatest change happened to *ě̄ and non-final *ě̀, which in the Lower Carniolan dialect base diphthongized into eːi̯, but then monophthongized into ẹː in some dialects. In the Istrian dialect, however, it diphthongized again, this time into iːe. Stressed *ę and *e turned into i̯eː. Stressed *ǫ turned into uːo or uːə. Short *ò turned into uː in all positions and *ō turned into uːo. The vowels *ù and *ū turned into yː, and in the south also into uː, əː, or u̯ə. In the Šavrin Hills subdialect, diphthongs have monophthongized for a second time; *ě turned into ẹː, *e and *ę turned into eː.

Newly accented *e turned into iːe in the north and into ä/ȧ in the south, and newly accented *ə remained ə in the north, but turned into ä/ȧ in the south. Newly accented *o turned into u̯ä in the south. Short accented *i and *u, or if before the accented syllable, turned into e. Final *o turned into ȯ, u, or u̯ə, final *ǫ turned into u̯o, and final *ę turned into i̯e.

Velar *ł remained velar before central and back vowels. The second Slavic palatalization is still present for dorsal consonants in the north: k →t’/ć/č, g → j, x → ś/š. Syllabic *ł̥̄ turned into oːu̯ or uː. The consonant *g turned into ɣ in the north and palatal sounds remained, except that *t’ might have changed into ć or č. Final *m turned into n.

In the villages of Kubed, Gračišče, Hrastovlje, Dol pri Hrastovljah, and Zazid, the dialects lack the first monophthongization for *ě, and so it is still pronounced as *eːi̯, and iːe → i̯eː.

== Morphology ==
The preposition pri is used with the genitive instead of the locative. Apart from that, the morphology is poorly researched, but it is probably close to the Inner Carniolan dialect.

== Subdivision ==
The Istrian dialect is split into two subdialects: the northern, more archaic Rižana subdialect and the southern Šavrin Hills subdialect, which is more influenced by Croatian. The main differences are monophthongization and the loss of length differentiation in the Šavrin Hills dialect.

== Bibliography ==
- Logar, Tine (1996). Kenda-Jež, Karmen (ed.). Dialektološke in jezikovnozgodovinske razprave [Dialectological and etymological discussions] (in Slovenian). Ljubljana: Znanstvenoraziskovalni center SAZU, Inštitut za slovenski jezik Frana Ramovša. ISBN 961-6182-18-8.
- Šekli, Matej (2018). Legan Ravnikar, Andreja (ed.). Topologija lingvogenez slovanskih jezikov (in Slovenian). Translated by Plotnikova, Anastasija. Ljubljana: Znanstvenoraziskovalni center SAZU. ISBN 978-961-05-0137-4.
