= Plavje =

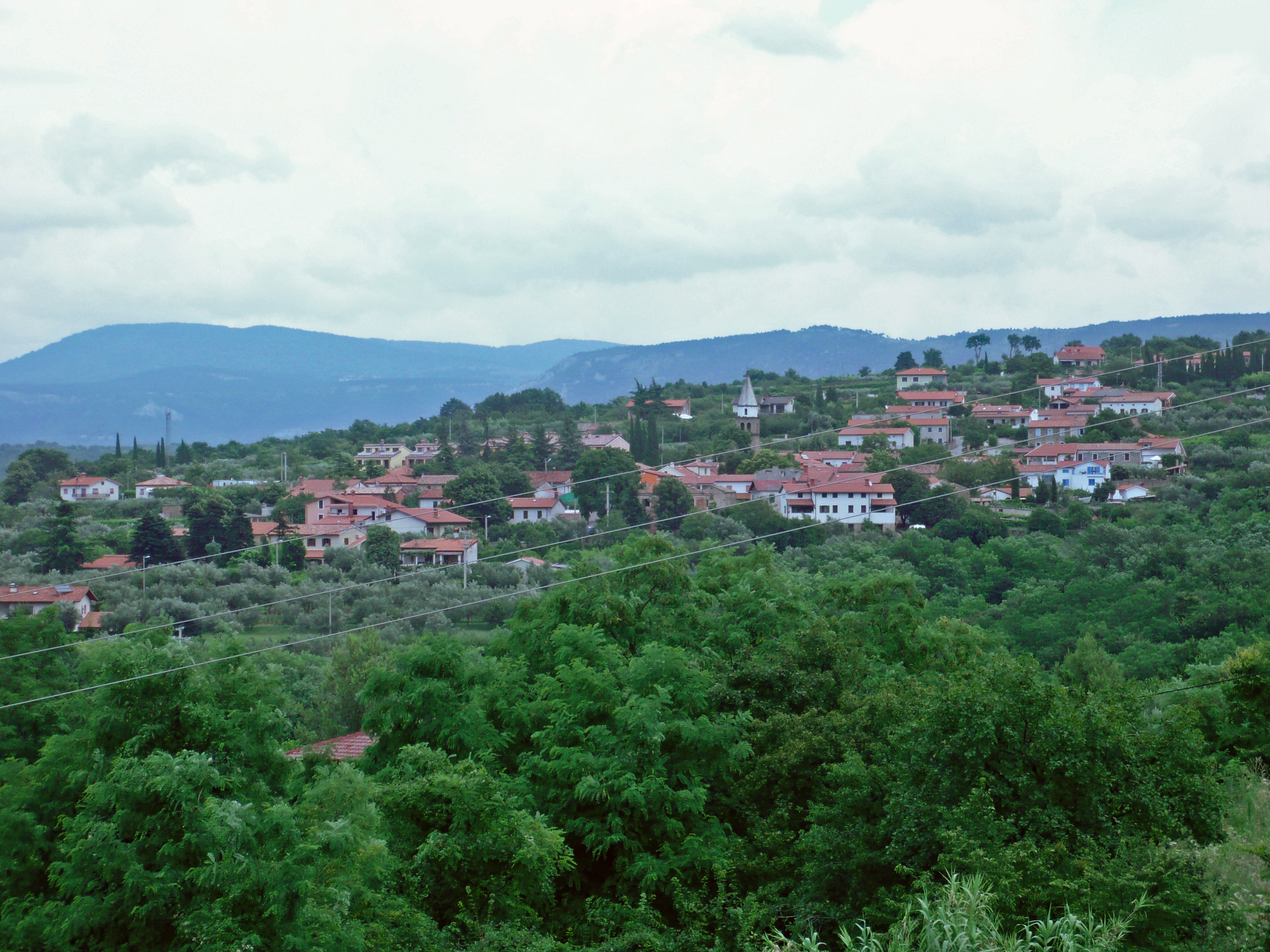

- Location in Slovenia
- Coordinates: 45°34′23.04″N 13°48′4.9″E
- Country: Slovenia
- Traditional region: Littoral
- Statistical region: Coastal–Karst
- Municipality: Koper

Area
  - Total: 2.99 km^{2} (1.15 sq mi)
- Elevation: 84.7 m (278 ft)

Population (2002)
  - Total: 435

Plavje (pronounced [ˈplaːu̯jɛ], in older sources Plavija, Italian: Plavia) is a village in the City Municipality of Koper in the Littoral region of Slovenia. It is located on the northernmost edge of the Istrian peninsula, on the border with Italy, on a small hill overlooking the Gulf of Trieste.

It has a small border crossing with Italy, connecting it with the nearby village of Belpoggio in Noghere (Slovene: Beloglav), south of Trieste, which used to be a hamlet of Plavje (until 1954). Since Slovenia's accession to the European Union and the Schengen area, customs and immigration checks have been abolished at the Italian-Slovenian border.

== Geography and climate ==
Plavje is located on a small slope overlooking the Gulf of Trieste and Koper Bay. It is located on the border with Italy, which runs on the northern edge of the village. It has good road connections to Koper and Trieste because it is located above the highway connecting the two cities. It enjoys a mild climate, save for the strong bora wind that frequently blows in the winter.

== History ==
During most of its history, Plavje was part of the municipality of Muggia. From the 14th century until 1797 it was part of the Republic of Venice. Between 1805 and 1813, it was under Napoleonic French rule. After Napoleon's defeat, it was included in the Austrian Empire, as part of the Margravate of Istria within the Austrian Littoral.

According to the last Austrian census of 1910/1911, the village had 771 inhabitants, of which 78.3% were Slovenes and 18.5% Istrian Italians. The rest were mostly Croats and Italians from the Kingdom of Italy.

In 1907, a Slovene-language primary school was opened in the village. In November 1918, the village was occupied by Italian troops and officially annexed to Italy in 1920. During World War II, partisan anti-Fascist guerillas were active in the area. The first cell of the Liberation Front of the Slovenian People in Slovenian Istria was organized in Plavje in early December 1941. After the Italian armistice in September 1943, it was occupied by Nazi German forces and included in the Operational Zone Adriatic Coast. Many locals were arrested and sent to prisons and Nazi concentration camps. In 1944, around 20 women from the village, were accused of collaboration with the Yugoslav partisans and were rounded up and sent to the Auschwitz-Birkenau concentration camp. The village was liberated by the Yugoslav People's Army on May 1, 1945. In early June 1945, the Yugoslav Army retreated east of the Morgan Line, and Plavje was occupied by British and American troops. The village was thus placed on the very border between Yugoslav and Anglo-American occupation zones, and became a centre of smuggling.

Between 1947 and 1954, Plavje was part of Zone A of the Free Territory of Trieste. It remained under Anglo-American occupation until 1954, when it was ceded to the Socialist Federal Republic of Yugoslavia, thus cutting off its connections with the settlements of Muggia, Dolina and Trieste, which were left in Italy. Since then, it has been gravitating towards Koper. A local border crossing with Italy was opened northwest of village in 1955.

In 1991, it became part of independent Slovenia. During the Ten-Day War of 1991, some intensive fighting took place close to the village, at the international border crossing between Rabuiese, Italy and Spodnje Škofije, Slovenia.

Since 1991, it has mostly become a bedroom community of Koper, with most locals daily commuting to the town for work.

== Economy ==
Plavje is an important center of local olive oil production. It also produces some quality wines, especially Refosco and Malvasia. Nevertheless, agriculture is a part-time activity because most of the people commute to Koper for work.

== Culture and traditions ==
The great majority of the population of the village are Slovenes, and they speak the Rižana subdialect of the Istrian dialect.

The local church is dedicated to Saint Lucy and is now a chapel of ease of the Parish of Škofije, established in 1960.
