= Morgan Line =

1945 military boundary in southeast Europe

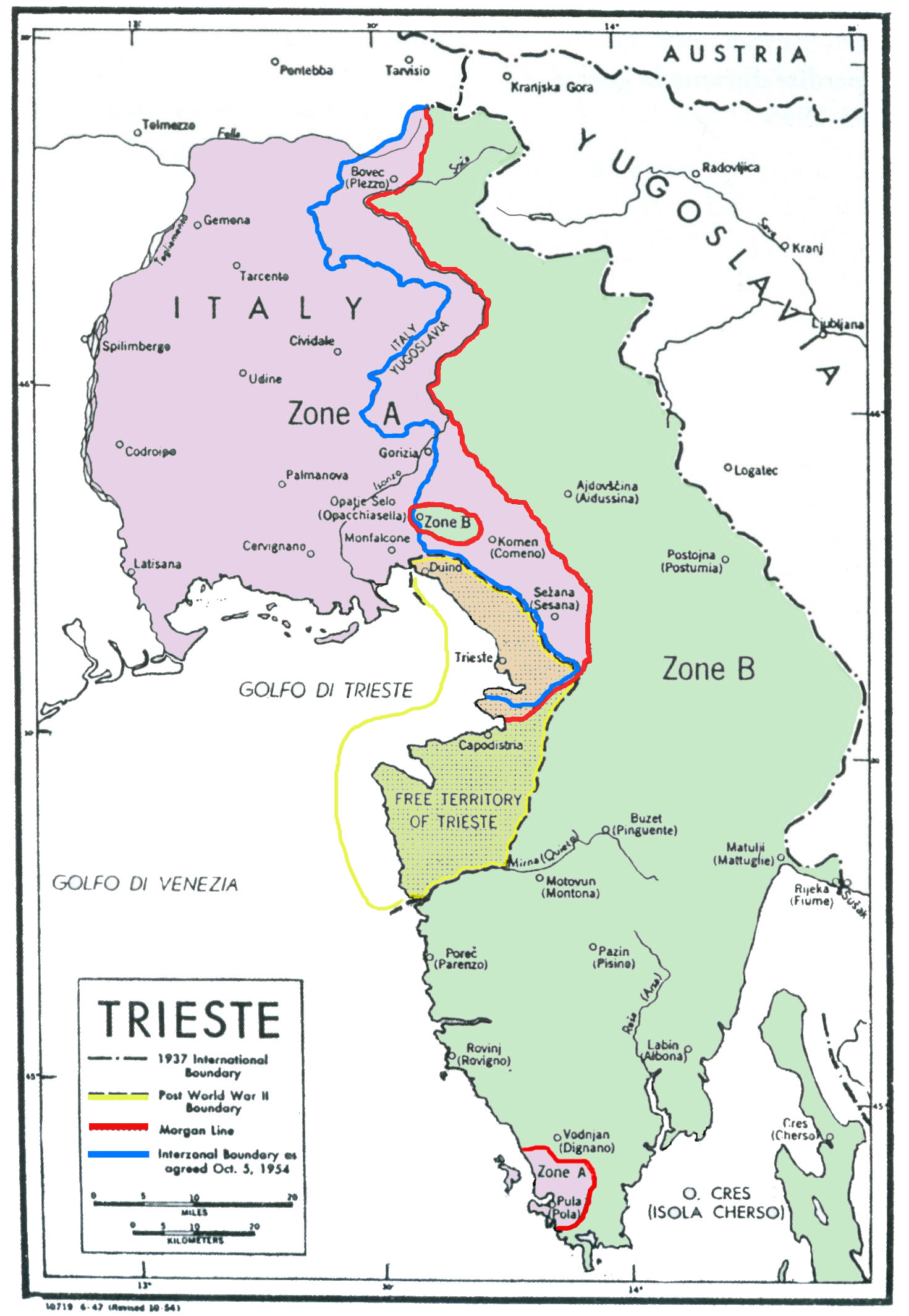
The division of the Julian March between June 1945 and September 1947, with the Morgan Line in red

The Morgan Line (Italian: Linea Morgan, Slovene: Morganova linija or Morganova črta and Croatian: Morganova linija) was the line of demarcation set up after World War II in the region known as Julian March which prior to the war belonged to the Kingdom of Italy. The Morgan Line was the border between two military administrations in the region: the Yugoslav on the east, and that of the Allied Military Government on the west. After 15 September 1947, the Allied Military Government was composed of both the British Element Trieste Forces (BETFOR) troops from the United Kingdom and the Trieste United States Troops (TRUST) from the United States.

== Boundary ==
The Morgan Line established a temporary boundary between the Yugoslav and Allied administrations in the region of Julian March (Venezia Giulia), contended by Italy and the Socialist Federal Republic of Yugoslavia, and also to reduce the possibility of combat between Allied and Yugoslav forces in the area. The line was named after the British representative at the negotiations in Duino that resulted in the demarcation, Lieutenant General Sir William Duthie Morgan. Morgan, chief of staff to Field Marshal Sir Harold Alexander, Supreme Allied Commander in the Mediterranean, had been sent to Belgrade on May 7 to remind Yugoslav leader Josip Broz Tito that Yugoslav forces were in violation of a February 1945 written agreement between Tito and Alexander in occupying the territory. During the negotiations, Morgan drew up a line, then called the "Blue Line" and, when Allied troops of the British XIII Corps began moving forward to the blue line on May 22, Tito agreed in principle to the demarcation the next day, with the agreement signed in Duino on June 10, 1945.

On April 30, Trieste was occupied by Yugoslav forces, and they were challenged by the 2nd New Zealand Division under General Freyberg, which reached Trieste on 2nd May, and received the surrender of the German forces. Cox said that it was the first major confrontation of the Cold War and was the one corner of Europe where no demarcation line had been agreed upon in advance by the Allies. The city remained part of Italy.

== Location ==
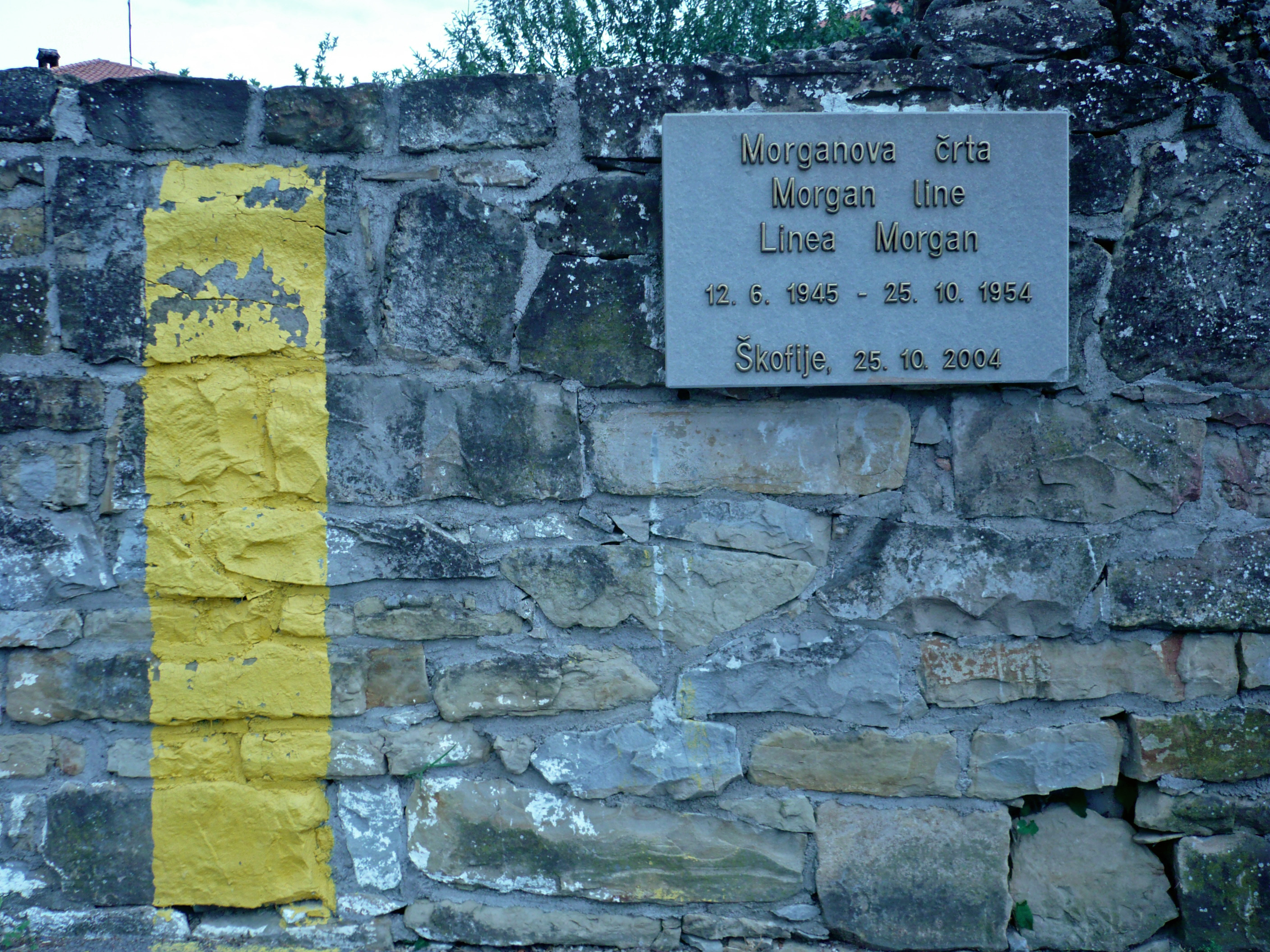
Memorial plaque to the Morgan Line in Spodnje Škofije, Slovenia. In Istria, the line served as the border between Zone A and Zone B of the Free Territory of Trieste between 1947 and 1954. Today, almost all of the former Morgan Line lies within Slovenian territory.

The line, approximately 70 miles in length, began on the coast just south of Trieste, curved 15 miles to the east and then northwest to Gorizia, Italy, then north along the Isonzo/Soča River through Kobarid to Rateče near the Italian-Austrian border. The demarcation divided the Julian March into two zones, "Zone A" under Allied military administration and "Zone B" under the administration of the Yugoslav People's Army.

=== Zone A ===
Zone A comprised the western portion of the region, which included the current Italian provinces of Trieste and Gorizia, a strip of territory between the current Slovene-Italian border and the Soča/ Isonzo river, the Brda/ Collio hills, the lower Vipava Valley/ Valle del Vipacco (corresponding roughly to the current Slovene municipalities of Šempeter-Vrtojba, Renče-Vogrsko, Miren-Kostanjevica and most of the municipality of Nova Gorica, except the Banjšice Plateau), the western section of the Karst Plateau (corresponding more or less to the current Slovene municipalities of Sežana and Komen), and the Istrian villages of Plavje, Spodnje Škofije, Elerji, and Hrvatini, now in Slovenia.

The Istrian coastal town of Pula (now in Croatia) was also under Allied administration, forming an enclave of Zone A within the territory of Zone B.

=== Zone B ===
The Yugoslav-administered Zone B extended to almost two-thirds of the region, including the city of Rijeka/ Fiume, most of the Istrian peninsula (with the exception of the town of Pula/Pola and the municipalities of Muggia and Dolina), the Cres-Lošinj/ Cherso - Lussino archipelago, and the eastern portion of the Slovene Littoral. The village of Opatje Selo/ Oppachiesella on the northwestern edge of the Karst Plateau formed a small enclave of Zone B within the territory of Zone A.

== End of the line ==
The Morgan Line ceased to exist on 15 September 1947, when the Treaty of Peace with Italy came into effect. The Treaty established the border between Italy and Yugoslavia in the northern sections of the contended territory, as well as the border between Yugoslavia and the Free Territory of Trieste established as new independent, sovereign State under a provisional regime of Government under the direct responsibility of the United Nations Security Council in its southern part. Allied troops along the Morgan Line withdrew several miles to a parallel "French Line" (adopted at the recommendation of the French Foreign Minister), part of which ran along sections of the former Morgan Line.

The Free Territory was divided into two administration zones (Zone A, under an Allied Military Government and Zone B under a Yugoslav Military Government), and the demarcation line between the two zones ran along the Morgan Line. In 1954, when both military governments handed over their mandate, to the Governments of Italy and Yugoslavia respectively the villages of Plavje/ Plavie, Spodnje Škofije/ Albaro Vescovà, Elerji and Hrvatini/ Crevatini were annexed to Yugoslavia.

Today, almost all of the former Morgan Line is completely within Slovenian territory. Only a very small part still serves as a border between Italy and Slovenia, dividing the Italian municipality of San Dorligo della Valle from the Slovenian municipality of Koper / Capodistria.

== Sources ==
- White's Political Dictionary, 1947
