= Šavrin Hills subdialect =

Subdialect of Slovene

The Šavrin Hills subdialect (šavrinski govor, šavrinščina, šavrinsko podnarečje) is a Slovene subdialect of the Istrian dialect in the Littoral dialect group. It is spoken in the Šavrin Hills (Slovene: Šavrinsko gričevje) south of a line from Koper to south of Zazid. It includes the settlements of Koper, Izola, Portorož, Sečovlje, Šmarje, Sočerga, and Rakitovec.

== Phonological and morphological characteristics ==
Like the Rižana subdialect, the Šavrin Hills subdialect is based on characteristics of the Lower Carniolan and Littoral dialect groups. The Šavrin Hills subdialect is additionally based on a mixture of Slovene, Croatian, and Serbian dialect elements connected with the settlement of the Uskoks in Istria in the 16th and 17th centuries. Accented vowels do not have a length contrast. The vowel system differs from the Rižana subdialect in that the long accented vowels are monophthongal. Verbal conjugation lacks the dual. The Šavrin Hills subdialect shares many lexical features with the Rižana subdialect, with many loanwords from Romance languages.
