= Slovene Istria =

Region in southwest Slovenia

Coordinates: 45°33′9.09″N 13°54′11.51″E

Slovene Istria Slovenska Istra (Slovene) Istria slovena (Italian)
- Region
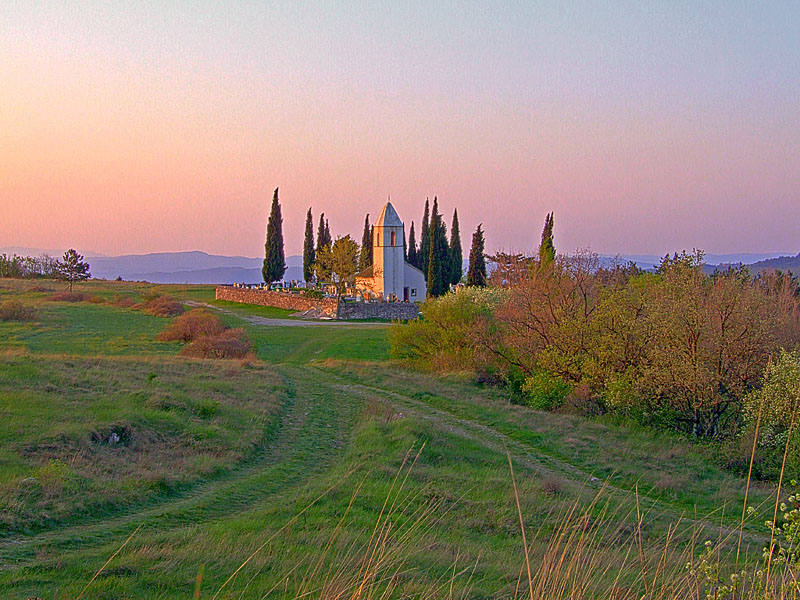
- Rural landscape in Slovene Istria

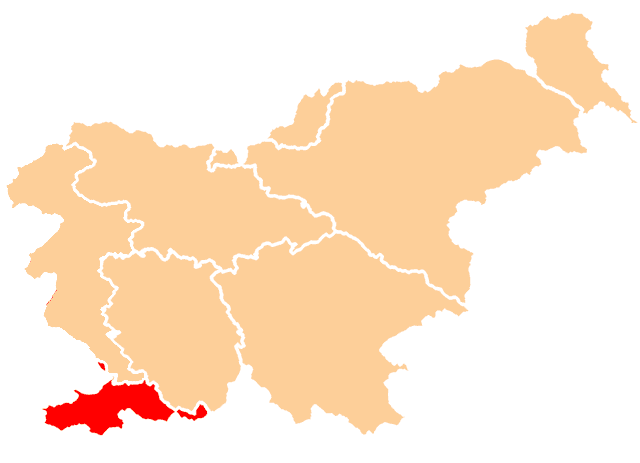
- Map of Slovenia highlighting the region location
- Seat: Koper

Population (2002)
  - Total: 93,089
- Demonym: Istrian
- Time zone: UTC+01 (CET)
  - Summer (DST): UTC+02 (CEST)

Slovene Istria is a region in southwest Slovenia. It comprises the northern part of the Istrian peninsula and historical region and is now considered also part of the wider geographical-historical region known as the Slovene Littoral. Its largest urban center is Koper. Other large settlements are Izola, Piran, and Portorož. The entire region has around 120 settlements. In its coastal area, both Slovene and Italian are official languages.

== History ==
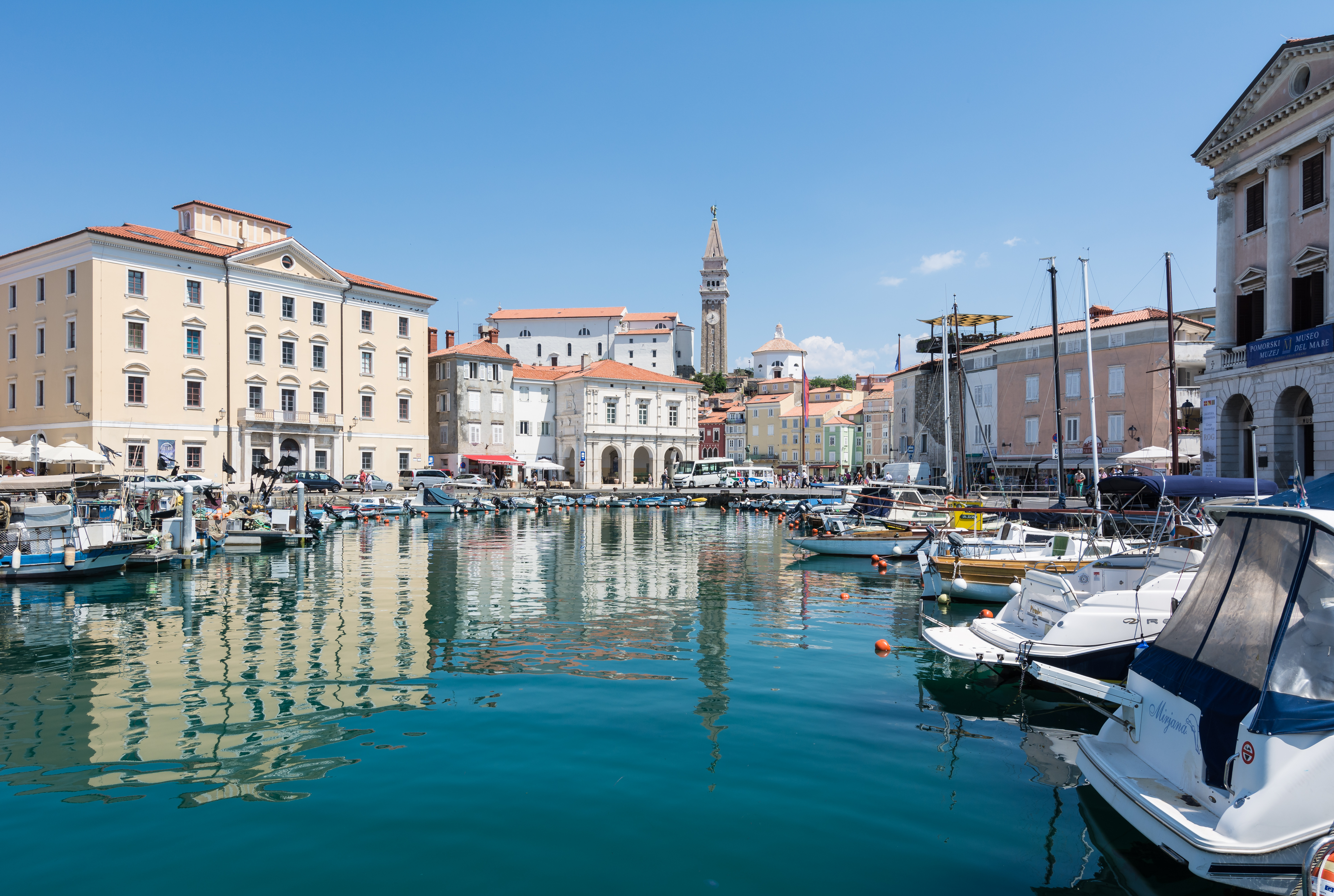
Piran's harbor and Tartini Square

The Istrian peninsula was known to Romans as the terra magica. Its name is derived from the Histri, an Illyrian tribe whom the geographer Strabo stated lived in the region. Romans described them as pirates who were hard to conquer due to the difficulty of navigating their territory. After two military campaigns, Roman legions finally subdued them in 177 BC. Many remains of ancient harbours and settlements still remain today, mostly in Ankaran, Hrvatini, Izola, Koper, and Piran.

With the fall of the Western Roman Empire in 476, Istria was conquered by the Goths and the Byzantines. During Byzantine rule, in the 7th century, the area was raided and plundered by the Avars and Slavs. Istria was annexed by the Lombards in 751. But a few decades later it came under Frankish rule during the reign of Charlemagne, when his son Carloman conquered the peninsula in 789, and it was incorporated into the Carolingian March of Friuli. During the early Frankish rule, groups of Slavs are documented to be present in Istria as they were allowed by the authorities to build their first settlements in the region.

In 952 King Otto I of Germany ceded Istria together with the vast March of Verona and Aquileia to the Dukes of Bavaria. From 976 onward Verona was ruled by the Dukes of Carinthia, until in 1040 King Henry III established the separate March of Istria, which thereafter was successively controlled by various noble dynasties such as the Bavarian House of Andechs (temporarily ruling as the Dukes of Merania). In 1208/09 it fell to the Patriarchs of Aquileia, while large parts of the estates were held by the comital House of Gorizia.

Starting in 1267, the Republic of Venice gradually annexed the Istrian coast, also aided by the strong presence of the native Romance-speaking communities; the region regained its overseas ties which were loosened by the barbarian invasions. The coastal area somewhat reflowered, but the Venetian government's enmity toward Austria and the Ottoman Empire limited relations with the hinterland. After Napoleon's triumph in Northern Italy, the Treaty of Campo Formio in 1797 gave most of the Venetian Republic and all of the peninsula to the Habsburgs.

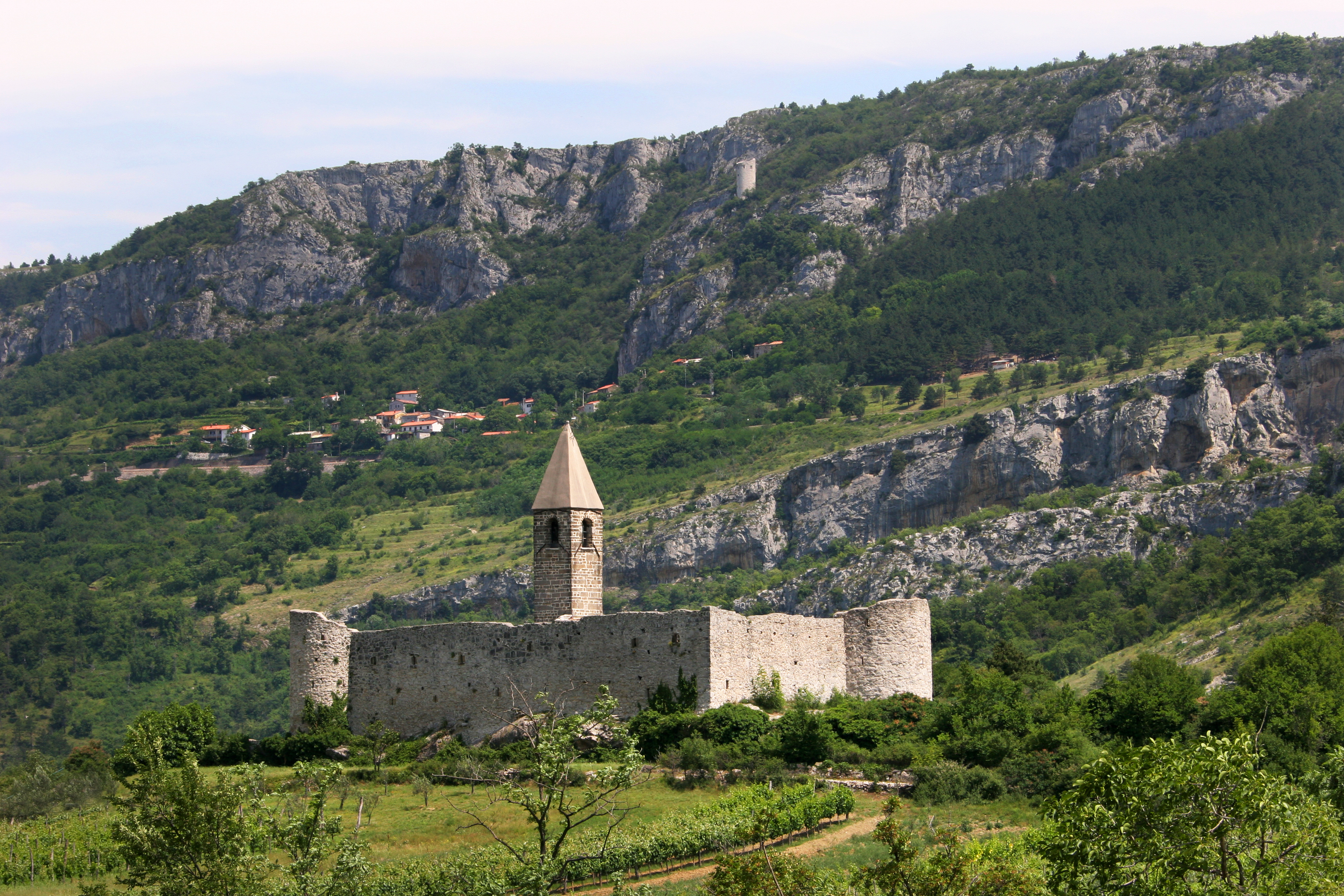
Fortified Holy Trinity Church in Hrastovlje

Between 1805 and 1813, it was under French rule, first as part of the Napoleonic Kingdom of Italy, then as a province within the Illyrian Provinces. In 1813, it was occupied by the Austrian Empire, which in 1815, after the Treaty of Vienna, annexed and unified the whole peninsula under a single administration with the capital in Pazin. In 1860, Istria became an autonomous province within the Austrian Littoral, with its own Provincial diet (Assembly). What is today Slovenian Istria was divided among the administrative district of Koper and Volosko: the former extended to the present-day municipalities of Koper, Izola and Piran, while the latter extended to the present-day municipality of Hrpelje-Kozina.

After World War I, according to the peace Treaty of Rapallo, in 1920 Istria became part of Italy. Fascism and, during the last part of World War II, the Nazi occupation spoiled ethnic relations. After World War II, the larger part of Istria except its northwestern section was assigned to Yugoslavia in 1947. As a consequence, between 1945 and 1960, over 270,000 ethnic Italians, along with few tens of thousands Slovenes and Croats and inhabitants of mixed backgrounds, left the whole region assigned to Jugoslavia in the so-called Istrian–Dalmatian exodus. Between 1947 and 1954 Slovenian Istria was divided between the Federal People's Republic of Yugoslavia and the Free Territory of Trieste. After the abolition of the Free Territory in 1954, the region became part of the People's Republic of Slovenia within Yugoslavia.

Between the 1950s and 1970s, the region experienced profound changes. A significant portion of the rural population moved to the coastal towns, which had remained semi-deserted after the Istrian–Dalmatian exodus. The local Italian population shrank in number. Many villages were depopulated, while the towns grew in number. Koper developed into an important portal town, and one of the major centres of Slovenian economy.

== Geography ==
The 43 kilometers long coastline of Slovenian Istria has numerous peninsulas and bays such as the Piran peninsula and the Bay of Piran, the Bay of Koper and the Southern part of the Muggia peninsula on which is at the same time one of only two nature reserves on Slovenian coast, the other one being the Strunjan reserve. In the Strunjan reserve lies the only coastal cliff in Slovenia which is at the same time the only cliff in Gulf of Trieste. The inner part of the region is more hilly, with various types of landscape, including the most known karst landscape in the Karst region.

The most important water-flows in Slovenian Istria are the Dragonja and Rižana rivers. Along the mouth of the Dragonja river are the Sečovlje Saltworks, one the last operating and of the largest along the Adriatic sea.

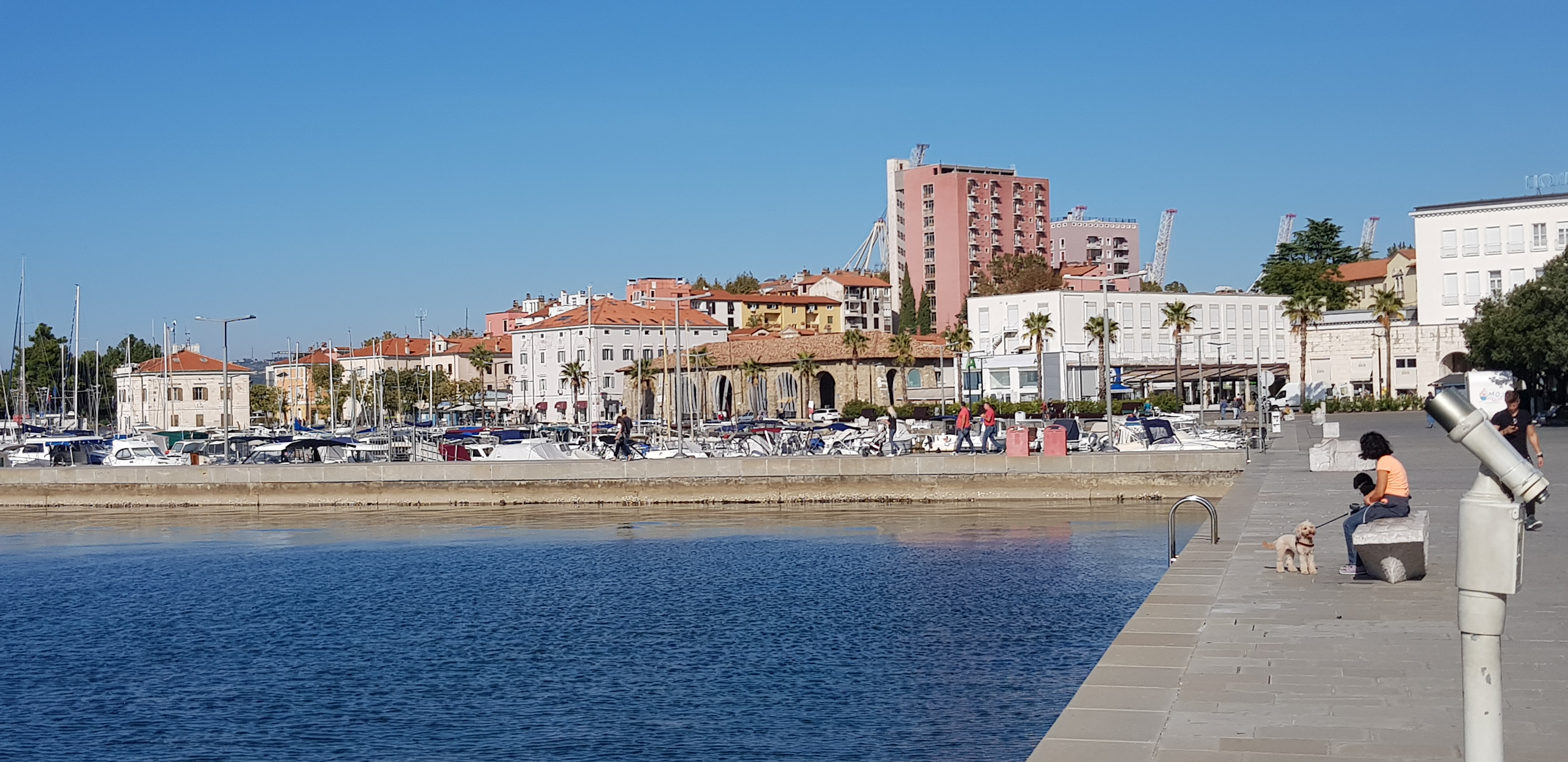
Koper

Izola

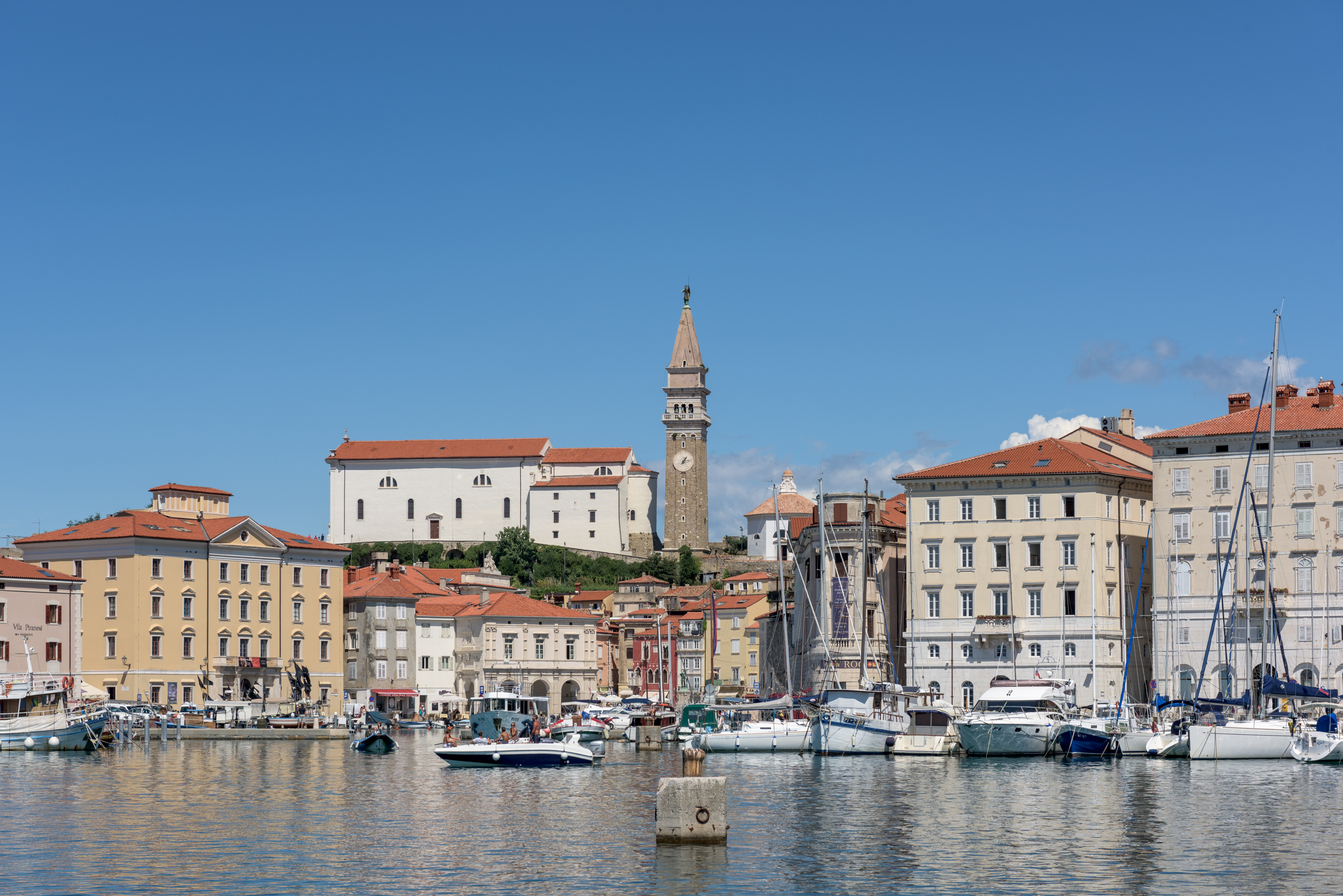
Piran

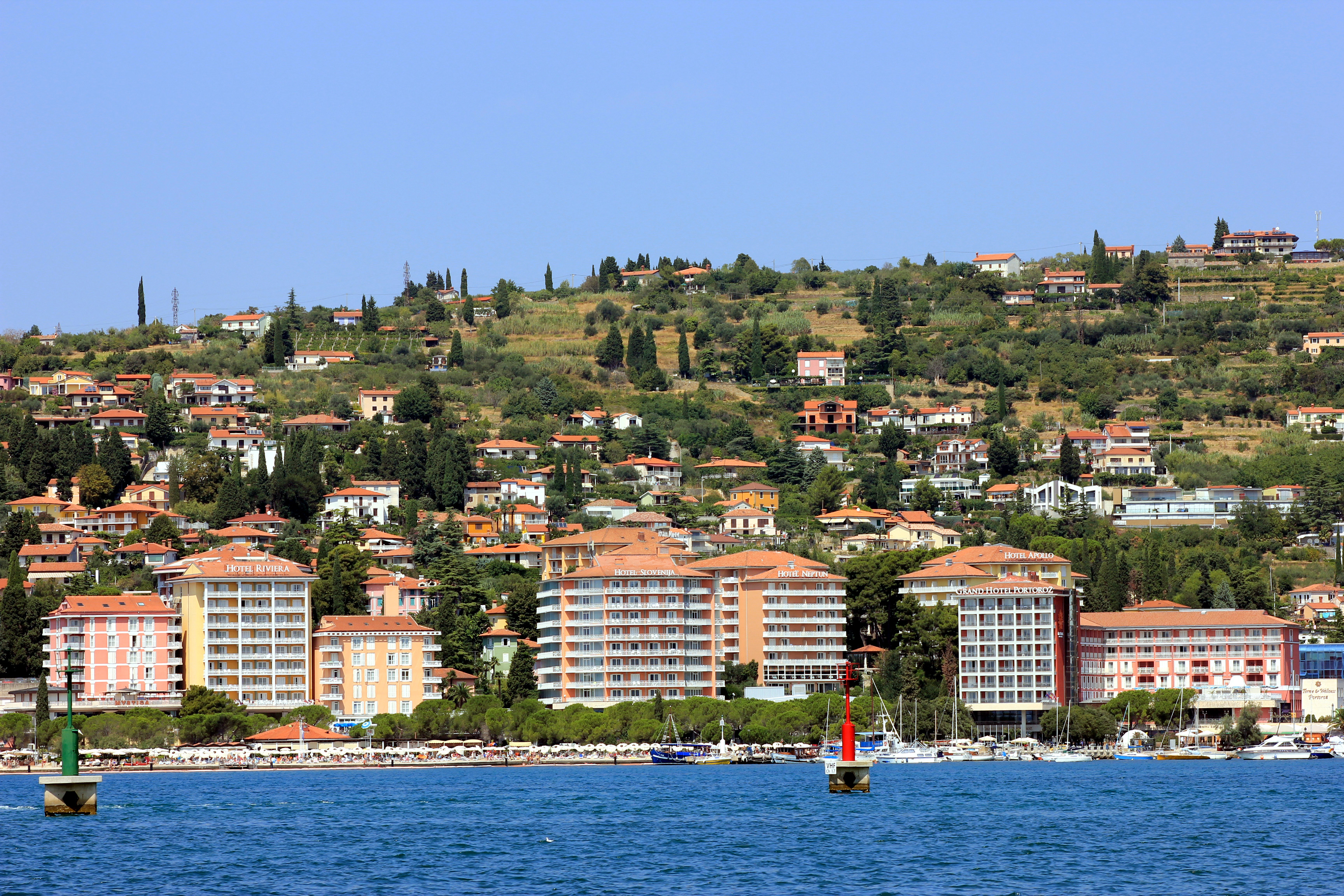
Portorož
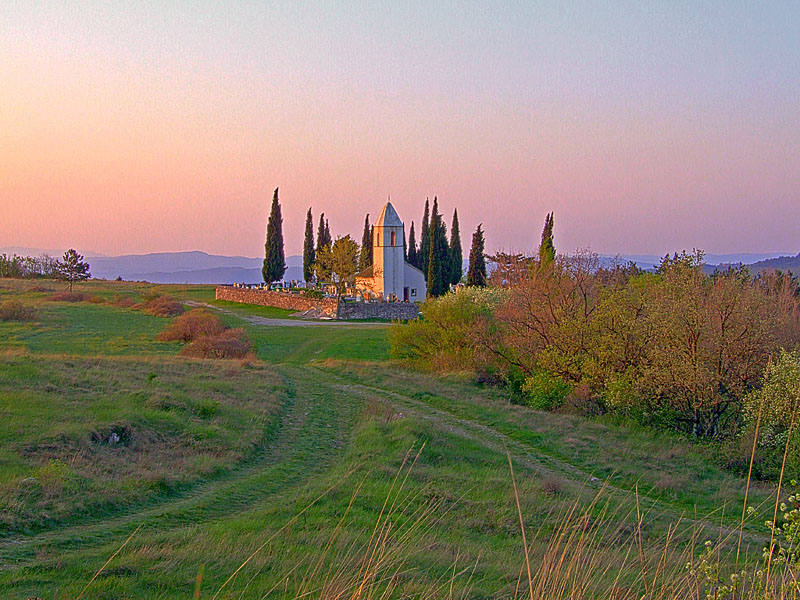
Rural landscape in Slovenian Istria

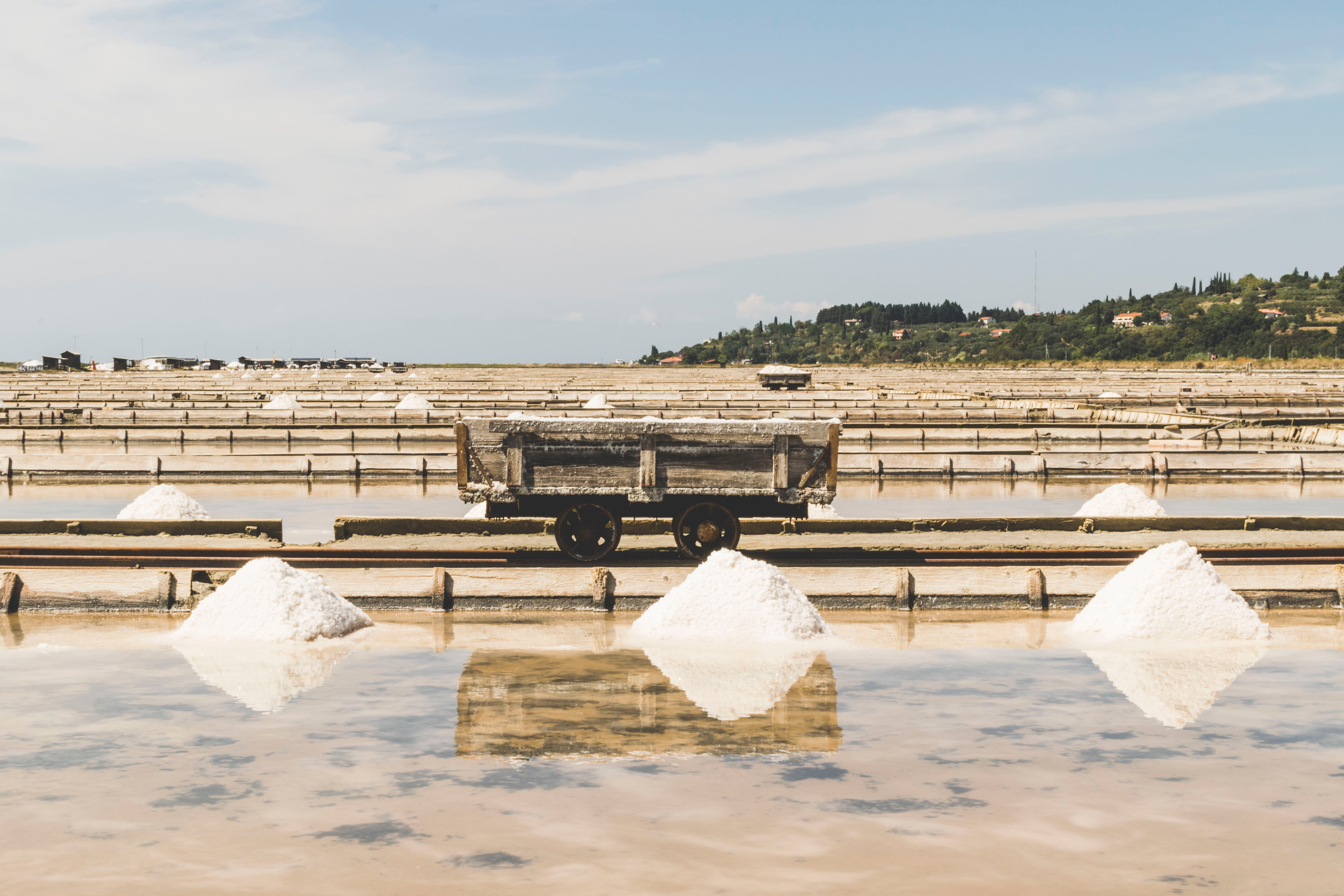
Sečovlje Saltworks

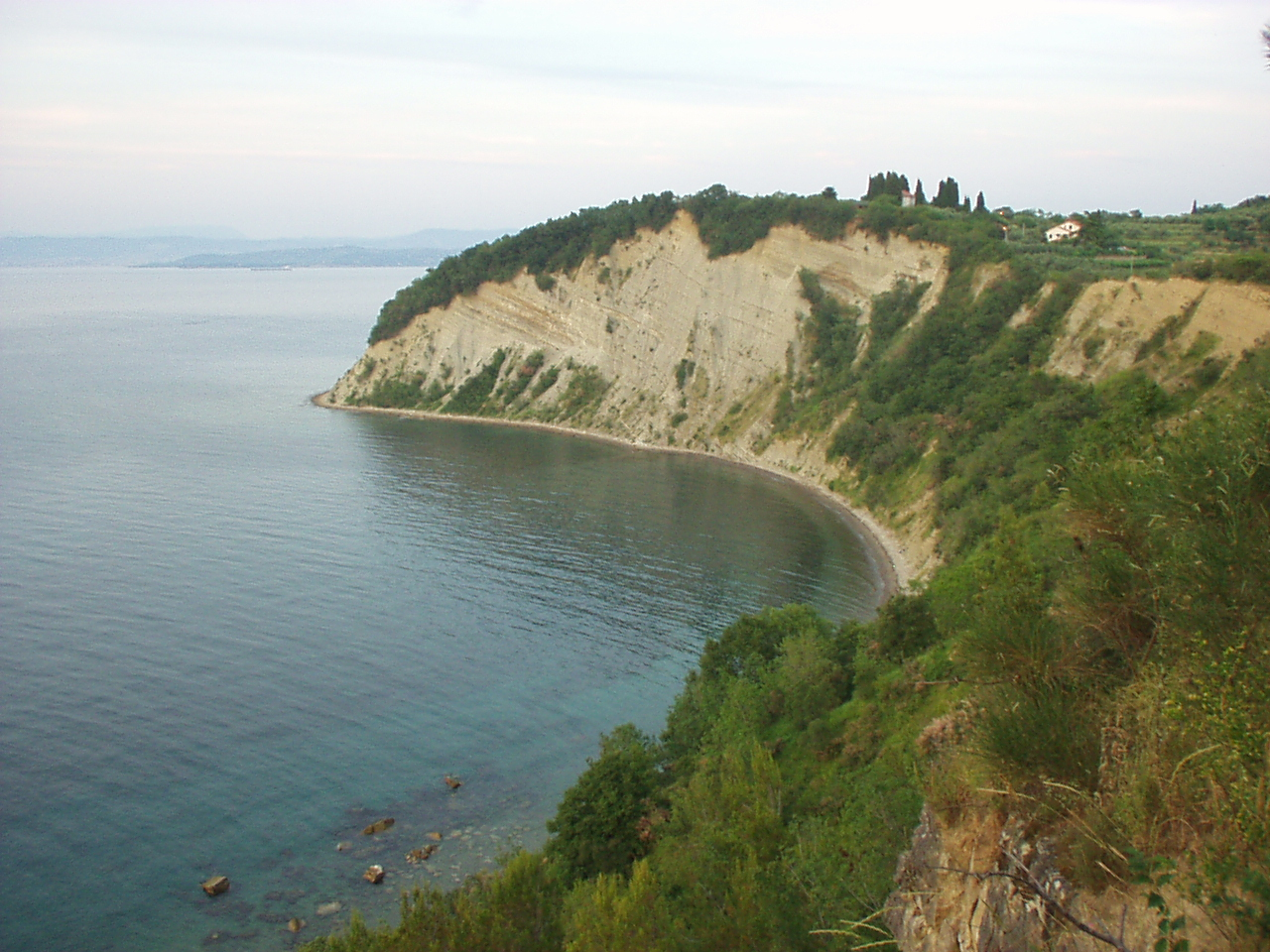
Moon Bay, Strunjan

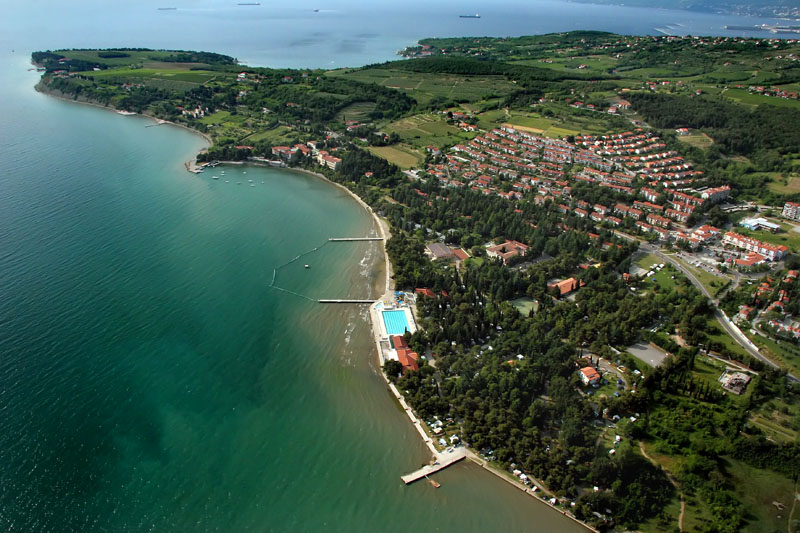
Debeli Rtič Peninsula and Ankaran

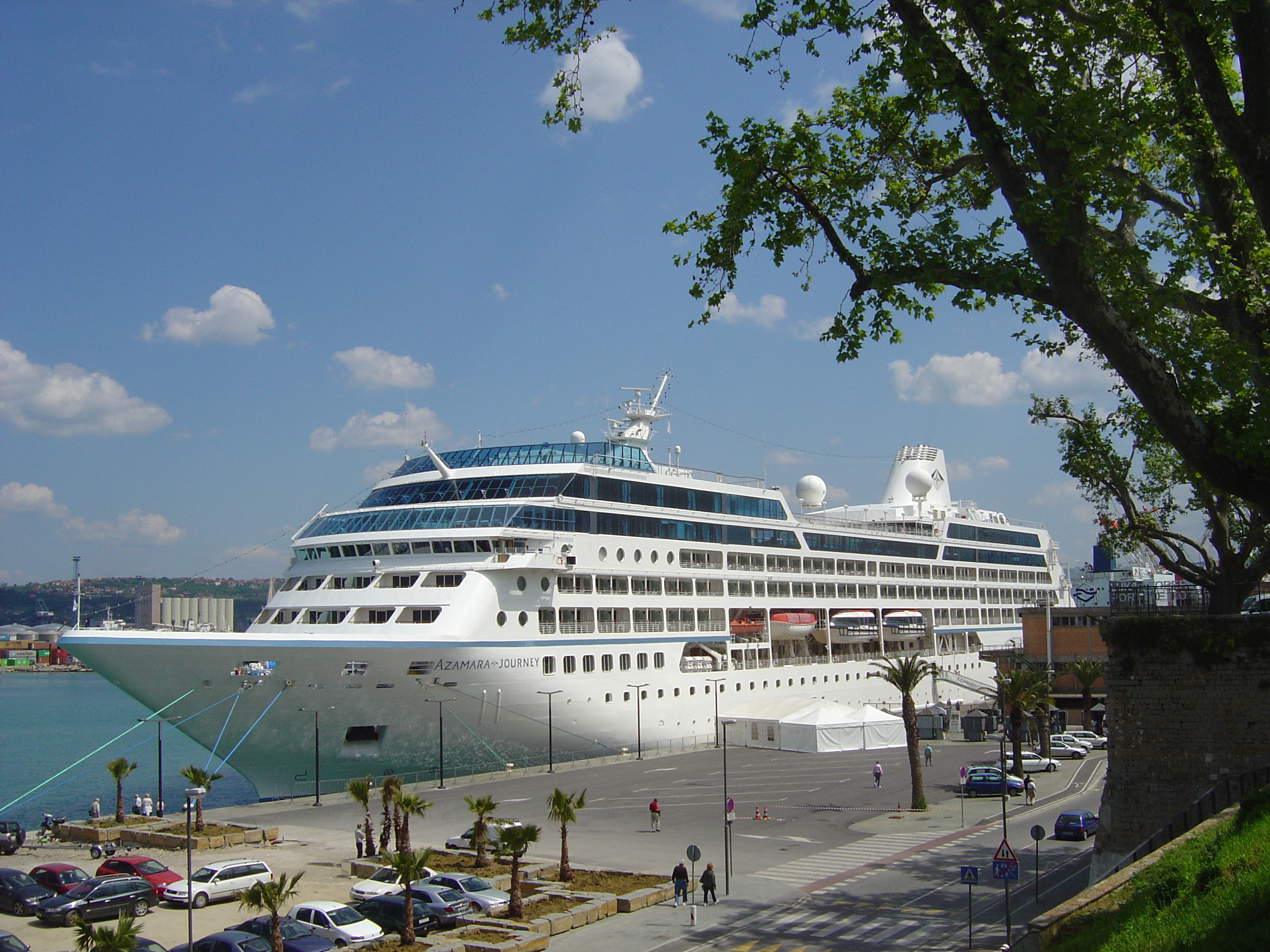
A cruise ship in Koper harbour

== Economy and transportation ==
Slovenian Istria is the second most prosperous region in Slovenia after Central Slovenia. The two most important economic branches are transport and tourism, followed by services and industry.

The Port of Koper is the only international port in Slovenia and one of the largest in the Adriatic Sea.

=== Tourism ===
Tourism is one of the main industries on the Slovenian coast, especially in Portorož, Piran, Izola and Sečovlje, where the most important historical monument is the Venetian Gothic Mediterranean town of Piran. The neighboring town of Portorož is a popular modern tourist resort, offering entertainment in gambling tourism. The former fishermen town of Izola has also been transformed into a popular tourist destination; many tourists also appreciate the old Medieval center of the port of Koper, which is however less popular among tourists than the other two Slovenian coastal towns. Near the village of Sečovlje there is the Sečovlje Salina Nature Park, which is a cultural heritage site and a tourist attraction. Among other less important are the Strunjan nature reserve, various small camps in the nature, village of Ankaran and Debeli Rtič.

=== Agriculture ===
Slovenian Istria is especially renowned for its wines and olive oil. The most common wine varieties are refosco (red) and malvasia (white). Other products include cherries, figs, and vegetables, such as radicchio, tomatoes and asparagus.

== Language ==
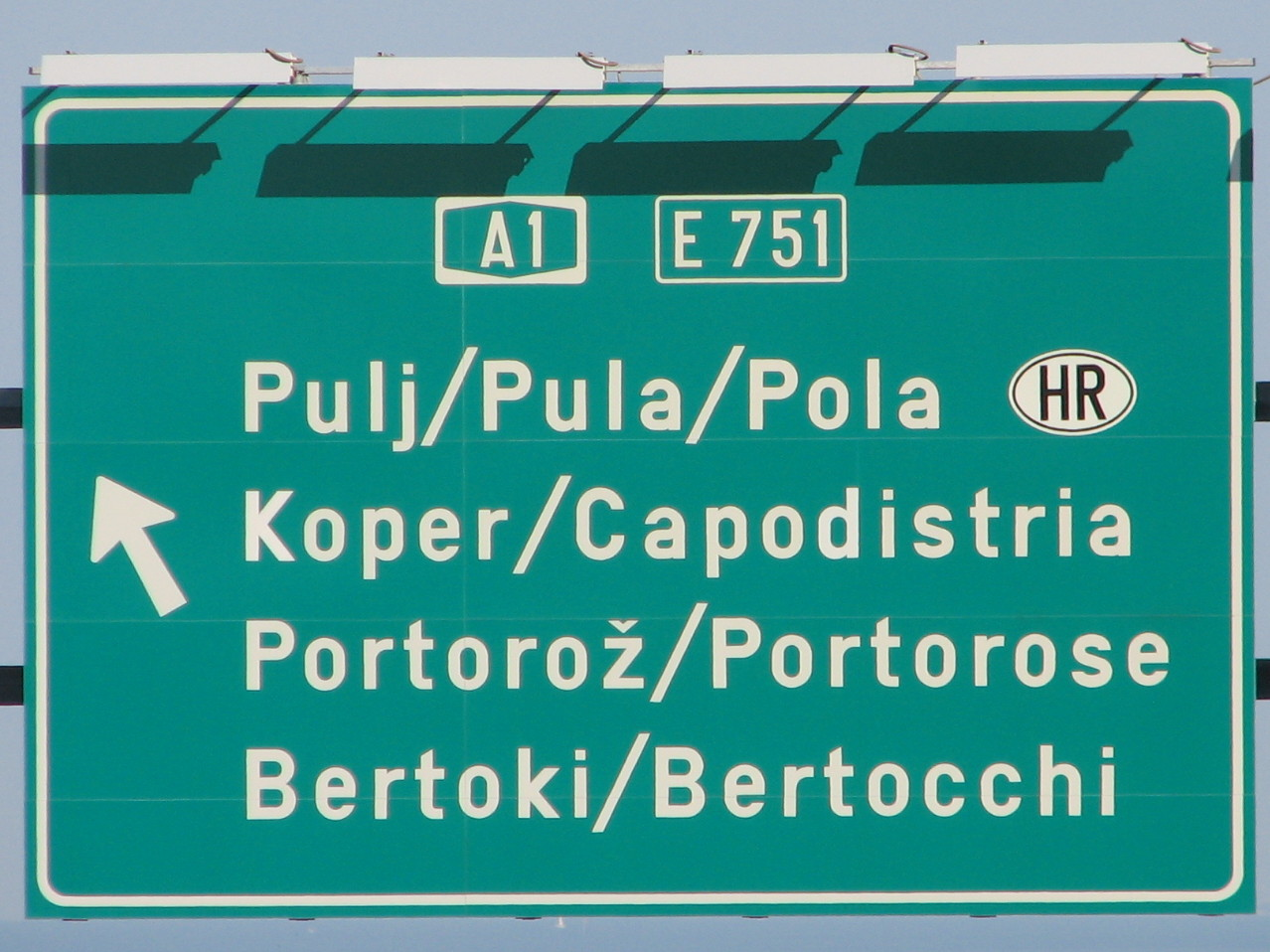
A multilingual sign in Slovene and Italian (also partly in Croatian) near Koper.

In the Slovenian Riviera and some villages in the interior, both Slovene and Italian are official languages. In the rest of Slovenian Istria, comprising most of its rural area, only Slovene is recognized as official language.

According to the 2002 census, Slovene is spoken as the first language by 70.2% of the inhabitants of Slovenian Istria, Italian by 3.3%, and various forms of Serbo-Croatian, dominated by Croatian, by 16% of the population. The highest percentage of Italian speakers is in the municipality of Piran (7%), while the highest percentage of Croatian speakers is in Izola (31%). General population polls have shown that the majority of the population in Slovenian Istria is conversational in several languages: Slovene, Italian, Croatian and English, all of which have at least some degree of presence in press, administration, business and popular culture.

=== Slovene-Italian bilingualism ===
Both Slovene and Italian are official in the municipalities of Piran, Izola and Koper. However, Italian is co-official only in the strip of land on the coast, traditionally inhabited by Istrian Italians. In the villages in the interior, only Slovene is official.

According to law, all official signs are to be written in both languages, as should all public notifications. Italian is to be used in all public offices in the bilingual area. For most jobs in the public administration and other public offices, the knowledge of both Slovene and Italian is required. Beside Slovene language schools, there are also elementary, high and grammar schools with Italian as the language of instruction. Pupils may choose between an education in Slovene or Italian; in either case, the other official language is being taught during the whole period of education, in order to provide that all residents speak both languages. At the state-owned University of Primorska, however, which is also established in the bilingual area, Slovene is the only language of instruction (although the official name of the university additionally includes the Italian version).

Italian may be used in the municipal assemblies of Koper, Izola and Piran, although in practice almost all discussions are carried out in Slovene.

=== Dialects ===
In the rural areas of Slovenian Istria, the Istrian dialect of Slovene is still spoken. It is divided into two sub-dialects: the Rižana subdialect, spoken in the northern areas, and the Šavrin Hills subdialect, spoken in the southern areas. In the municipality of Hrpelje-Kozina, the Inner Carniolan dialect is spoken. In a few villages on the border with Croatia, the Čičarija dialect is spoken, which is considered a transitional dialect between Slovene and Čakavian Croatian.

In the urban areas, a hybrid regional version of Slovene is spoken, which is phonetically very different from the rural dialects. It developed after World War Two, when new settlers from all Slovenia (many of whom from Slovenian Styria) moved into the towns, left by the Istrian Italians. Although it has borrowed many words from the Istrian dialect, it is markedly distinguishable from it.

Traditionally, the Istrian Italians living in Slovenian Istria have spoken the Venetian language. After the end of the World War II and the abolition and division of the Free Territory of Trieste the Venetian language lost as many as 90 percent of its speakers due to the mass emigration of the urban Italian population in Istria.

Due the dialect in being increasingly replaced nowadays by standard Italian it was entered into the official Register of Intangible Cultural Heritage of Slovenia.
