= Vanganel =

Vanganel Vanganello
- Location in Slovenia
- Coordinates: 45°31′1.63″N 13°46′40.7″E
- Country: Slovenia
- Traditional region: Littoral
- Statistical region: Coastal–Karst
- Municipality: Koper

Area
  - Total: 2.57 km^{2} (0.99 sq mi)
- Elevation: 33.9 m (111 ft)

Population (2020)
  - Total: 702

Vanganel (pronounced [ʋaŋɡaˈneːu̯]; Italian: Vanganello) is a settlement in the City Municipality of Koper in the Littoral region of Slovenia. At the end of 2020 it had 702 inhabitants.

== Geography ==
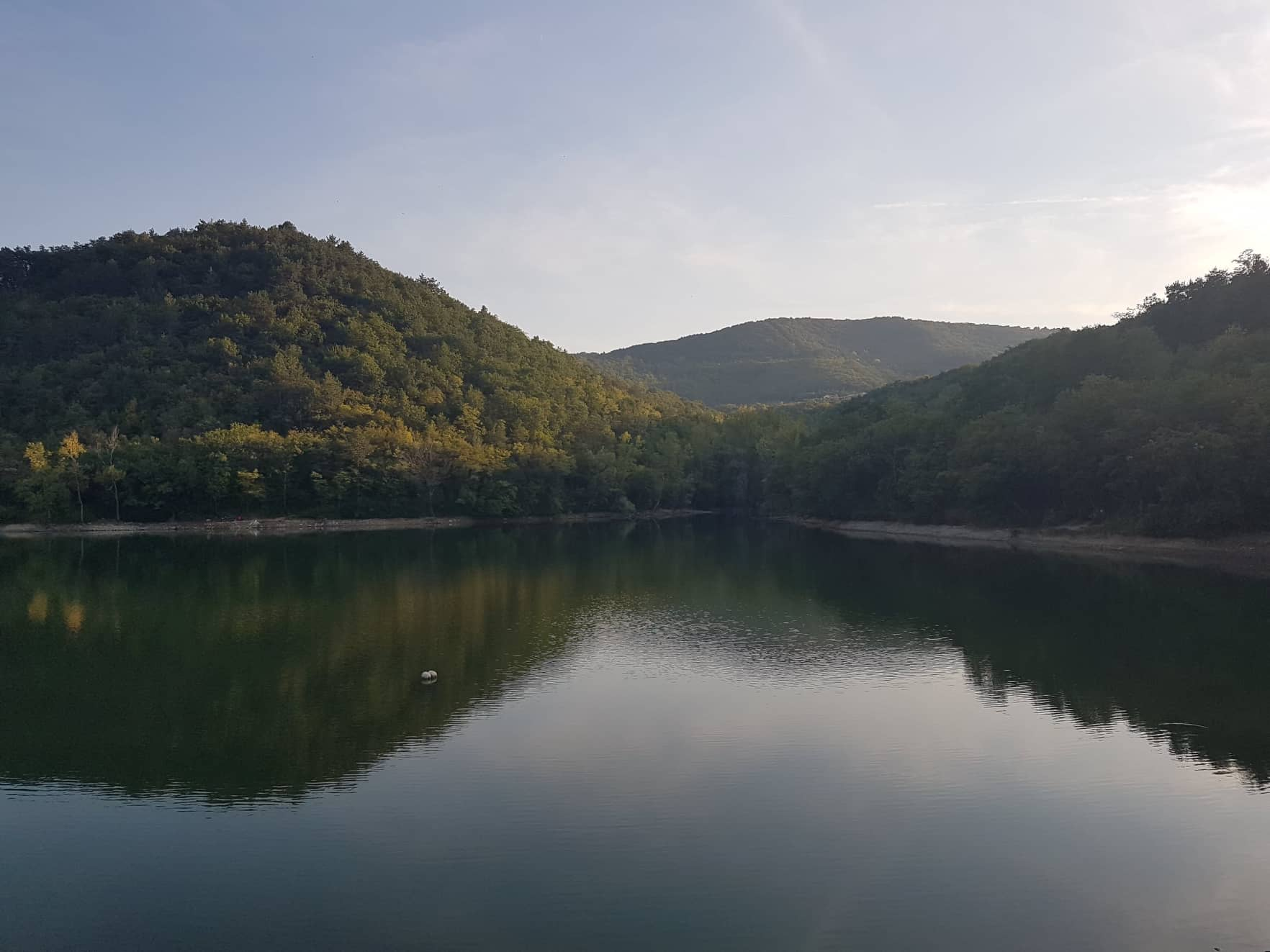
Lake Vanganel

South of Vanganel there is a reservoir, Lake Vanganel (Slovene: Vanganelsko jezero).

== Church ==
A small church in the settlement is dedicated to the Virgin Mary and belongs to the Parish of Marezige.
