= Gračišče =

Gračišče Gracischie
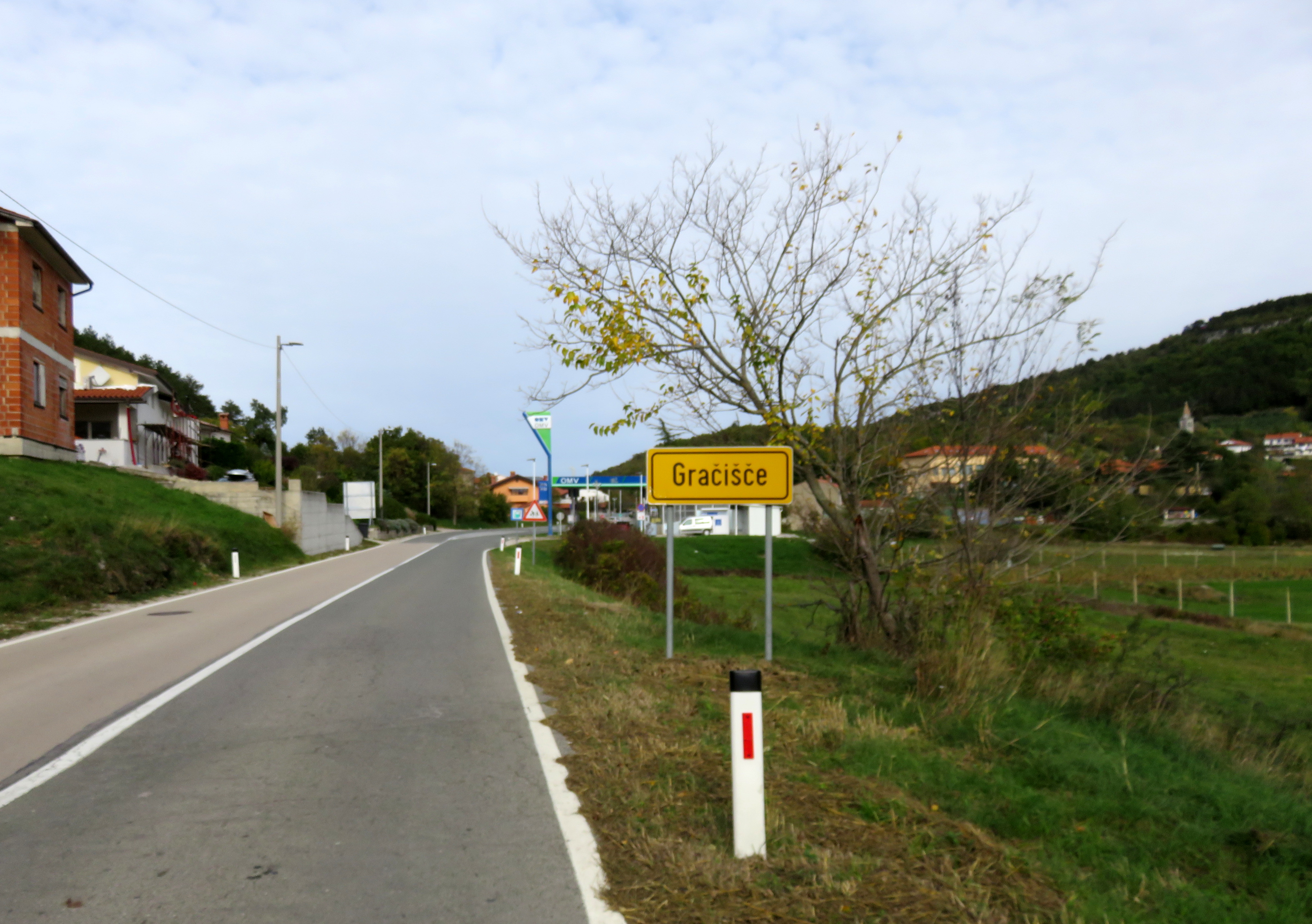

- Location in Slovenia
- Coordinates: 45°30′9.46″N 13°52′26.42″E
- Country: Slovenia
- Traditional region: Littoral
- Statistical region: Coastal–Karst
- Municipality: Koper

Area
  - Total: 3.43 km^{2} (1.32 sq mi)
- Elevation: 296.1 m (971 ft)

Gračišče (pronounced [ɡɾaˈtʃiːʃtʃɛ]; Italian: Gracischie) is a village in the City Municipality of Koper in the Littoral region of Slovenia.

The local church is dedicated to Saint Nicholas and belongs to the Parish of Kubed.

== Gallery ==
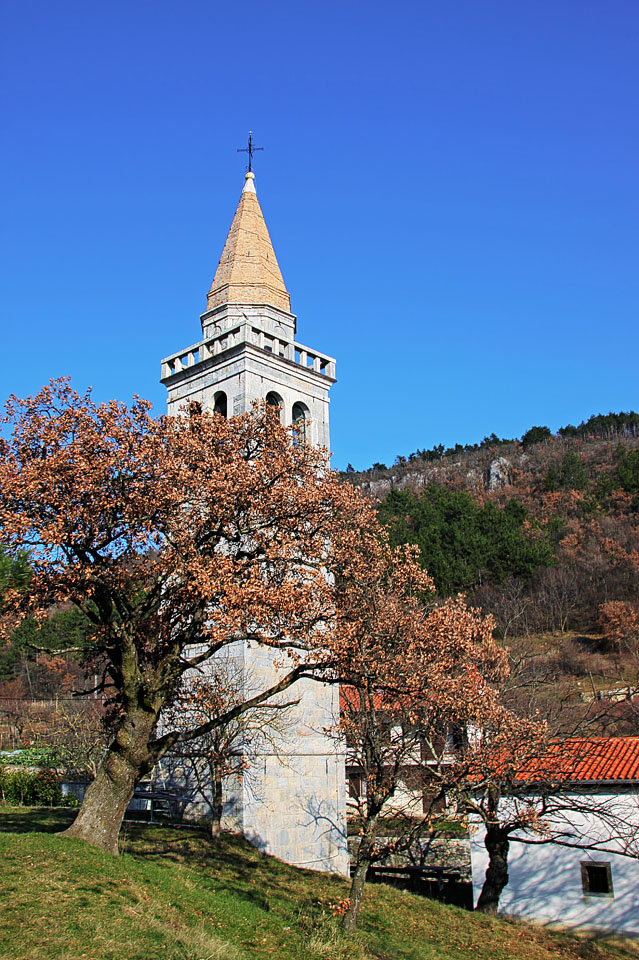
Saint Nicholas's Church

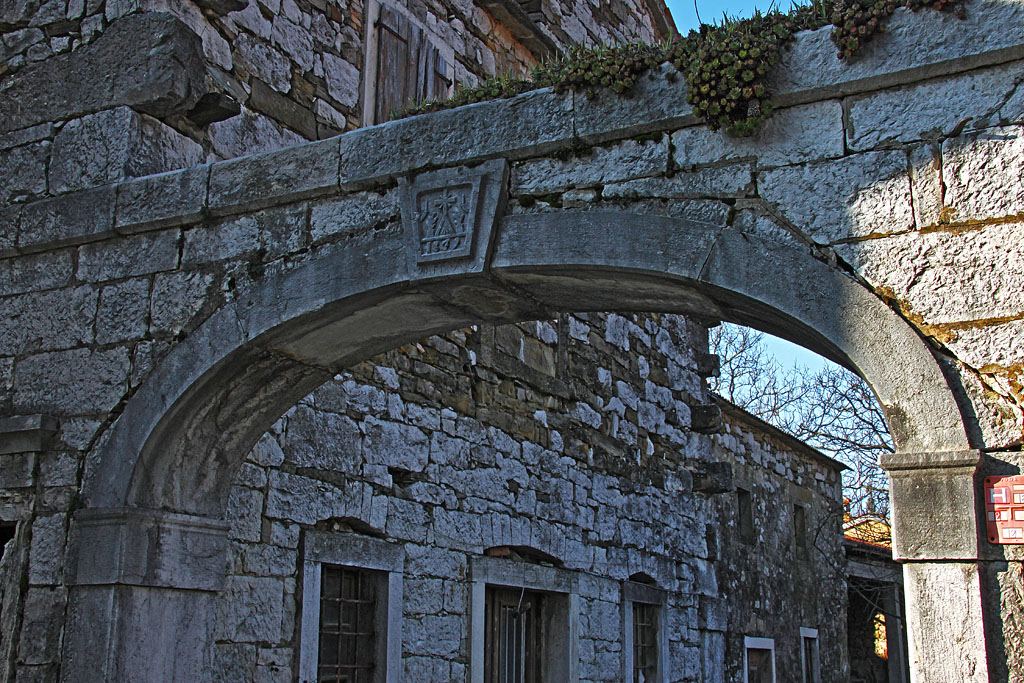
A gateway in the village
