= Rižana subdialect =

Subdialect of Slovene

The Rižana subdialect (rižanski govor, rižansko podnarečje) is a Slovene subdialect of the Istrian dialect in the Littoral dialect group. It is spoken in Italy in most of the municipalities of San Dorligo della Valle and Muggia (Milje) south of Trieste, as well as in some southern suburbs of Trieste (especially Servola); in Slovenia, it is spoken in the northern part of Slovene Istria, in the Rižana Valley east and north of Koper, including the settlements of Bertoki, Dekani, Osp, Črni Kal, Presnica, Podgorje, and Zazid.

== Phonological and morphological characteristics ==
Like the Šavrin Hills subdialect, the Rižana subdialect is based on characteristics of the Lower Carniolan and Littoral dialect groups. Accented vowels do not have length contrast. Secondary palatalization of the velars k g h has arisen before front vowels. Verbal conjugation lacks the dual. The two subdialects share many lexical features, with many loanwords from Romance languages.
