= Šmarje, Koper =

Village in Littoral, Slovenia

Šmarje
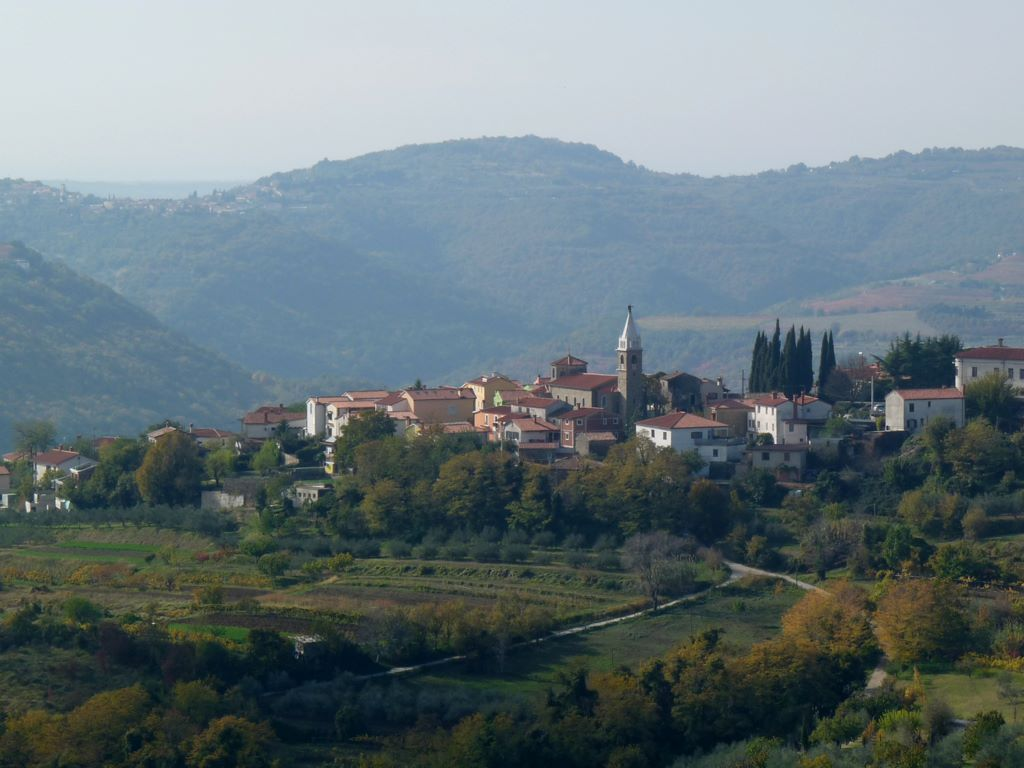

- Location in Slovenia
- Coordinates: 45°30′4.53″N 13°43′5.42″E
- Country: Slovenia
- Traditional region: Littoral
- Statistical region: Coastal–Karst
- Municipality: Koper

Area
  - Total: 3.85 km^{2} (1.49 sq mi)
- Elevation: 289.4 m (949 ft)

Population (2002)
  - Total: 390

Šmarje (pronounced [ˈʃmaːɾjɛ]; Italian: Monte di Capodistria) is a village in the City Municipality of Koper in the Littoral region of Slovenia.

The parish church in the settlement is dedicated to the Virgin Mary.
