= Rakitovec, Koper =

Rakitovec Acquaviva dei Vena
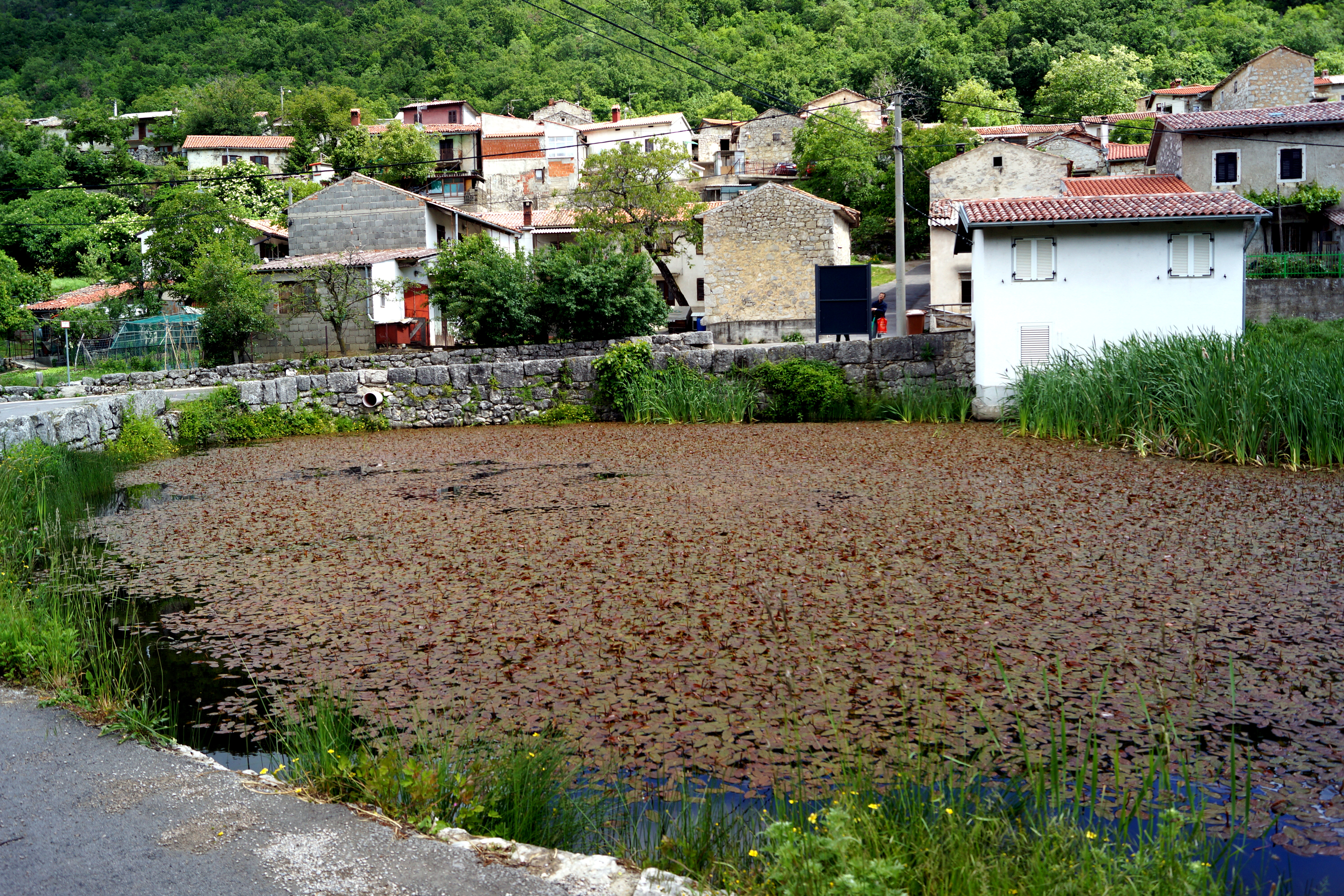

- Location in Slovenia
- Coordinates: 45°28′10.92″N 13°58′13.62″E
- Country: Slovenia
- Traditional region: Littoral
- Statistical region: Coastal–Karst
- Municipality: Koper

Area
  - Total: 9.36 km^{2} (3.61 sq mi)
- Elevation: 533.2 m (1,749 ft)

Population (2002)
  - Total: 145

Rakitovec (pronounced [ɾaˈkiːtɔʋəts]; Italian: Acquaviva dei Vena) is a village in the City Municipality of Koper in the Littoral region of Slovenia on the border with Croatia.

The local church is dedicated to Saint James and belongs to the Parish of Predloka.
