= Sočerga =

Sočerga San Quirico
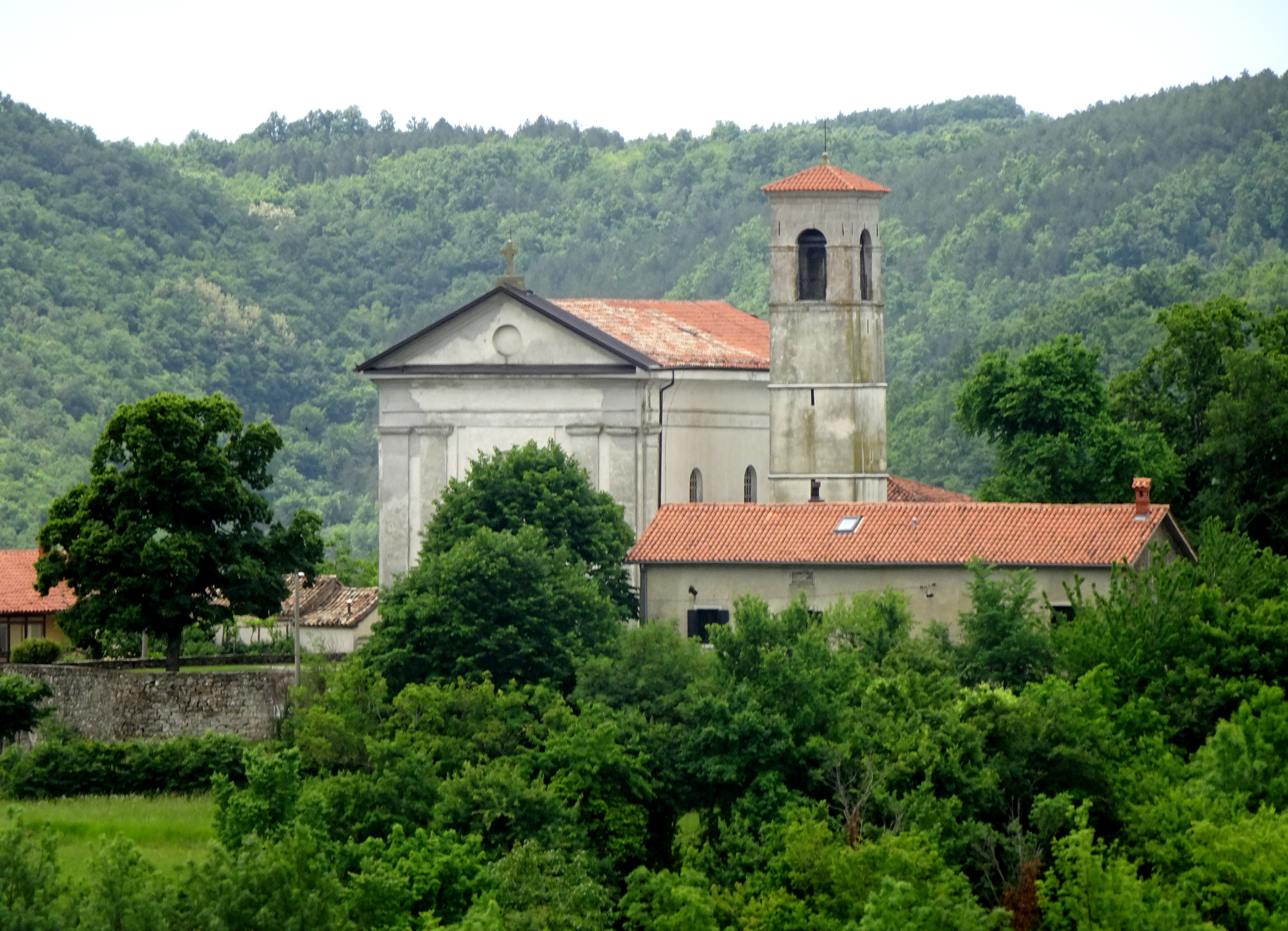

- Location in Slovenia
- Coordinates: 45°27′52.78″N 13°53′35.89″E
- Country: Slovenia
- Traditional region: Littoral
- Statistical region: Coastal–Karst
- Municipality: Koper

Area
  - Total: 2.61 km^{2} (1.01 sq mi)
- Elevation: 301.2 m (988 ft)

Population (2002)
  - Total: 64

Sočerga (pronounced [sɔˈtʃɛːɾɡa]; Italian: San Quirico) is a village in the City Municipality of Koper in the Littoral region of Slovenia.

== Name ==
Sočerga was mentioned in written sources in 1101 as Sanctus Syrus (and as Sanctus Sirgus in 1260–67, Sanctus Syricus in the 14th century, and Socerga and Socierga in 1763–87). Locally, the settlement is also known as Šenkvíriko. The Slavic name *Sǫčьrьgo was probably borrowed from the Friulian reflex *Sant-čirigo for Latin Sanctus Quiri(a)cus, referring to a local church. The name was reanalyzed as a feminine accusative, producing the Slovene name in -a.

== Churches ==
The parish church in the settlement is dedicated to the Holy Heart of Jesus, Saint Justus, and Saint Euphemia. The cemetery church outside the settlement, belonging to the same parish, is dedicated to Saint Quiricus.
