= Elerji =

Elerji Elleri
- Location in Slovenia
- Coordinates: 45°34′43.94″N 13°47′16.07″E
- Country: Slovenia
- Traditional region: Littoral
- Statistical region: Coastal–Karst
- Municipality: Koper

Area
  - Total: 0.65 km^{2} (0.25 sq mi)
- Elevation: 175.8 m (577 ft)

Population (2002)
  - Total: 141

Elerji (pronounced [ˈeːlɛɾji]; previously Jelarji, Italian: Elleri) is a small settlement in the City Municipality of Koper in the Littoral region of Slovenia on the border with Italy.

== Name ==
The name of the settlement was changed from Jelarji to Elerji in 2017.
