= Marezige =

Marezige Maresego
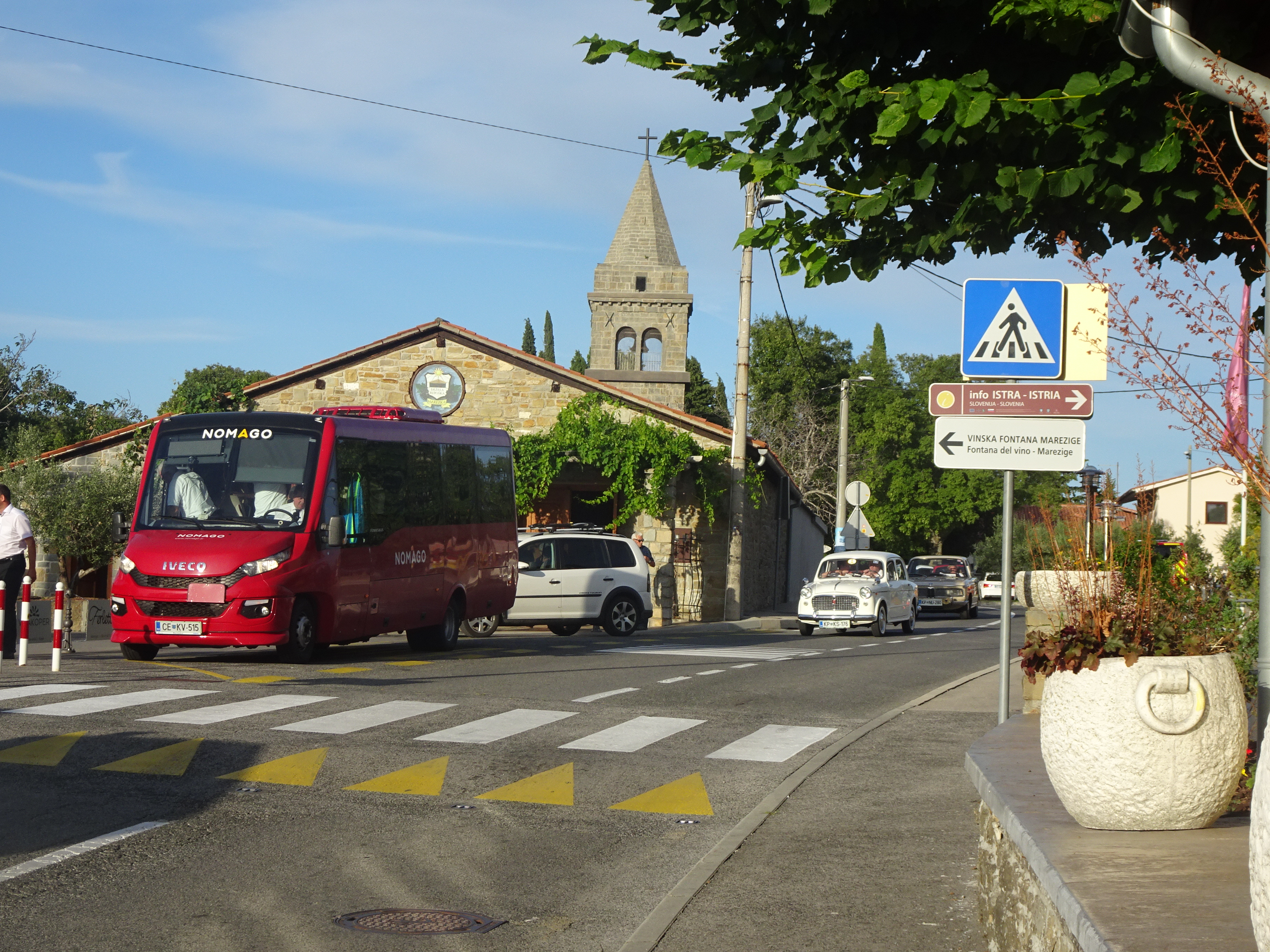
- Marezige square with local church
- Nickname: Capital of Refosco wine
- Location in Slovenia
- Coordinates: 45°30′32.52″N 13°47′45.83″E
- Country: Slovenia
- Traditional region: Littoral
- Statistical region: Coastal–Karst
- Municipality: Koper

Area
  - Total: 4.23 km^{2} (1.63 sq mi)
- Elevation: 224.3 m (736 ft)

Population (2002)
  - Total: 410

Marezige (pronounced [maˈɾeːziɡɛ]; Italian: Maresego) is a village in the City Municipality of Koper in the Littoral region of Slovenia.

The parish church in the settlement is dedicated to the Feast of the Cross.

== Geography ==
Marezige lies above the Vanganel Valley, at an elevation of 283 m. Marezige is a sprawling settlement, 10 km from Koper. There are vineyards with Refosco and Malvasia grapes, and olives.

== Name ==
The origin of the name Marezige is unknown. It is probably a secondary borrowing from a Romance name that was originally borrowed from Slavic, and may be derived from a person name.

== History ==
The municipality of Marezige was founded on August 24, 1898, and it belonged to the province of Istria. It consisted of three cadastral municipalities: Marezige, Truške, and Boršt. The economic development of Marezige was supported by the creation of a savings bank and a loan bank.

After the First World War, Istria was annexed by Italy. The authorities persecuted the Slovenian population and closed Slovenian schools. On May 15, 1921, a group of locals challenged the fascists in Marezige. The Municipality of Koper celebrates its municipal holiday in commemoration of this event, and the primary school in Marezige was named after Ivan Babič, who led the rebellion.

During the Second World War, a Partisan school was founded in Marezige in 1943. In October 1943 German forced burned houses in the village and killed hostages. The elementary school was rebuilt in 1949.

== Culture ==
There are various societies in Marezige dedicated to sports, hunting, and tourism.

== Notable residents ==
Notable people that lived in Marezige include:

- Andrej Munih (1875–1919), founder of the savings and loan bank and the National Union of Slovene Istria
- Nelda Štok Vojska (born 1943), author
