= Kubed =

Kubed Covedo
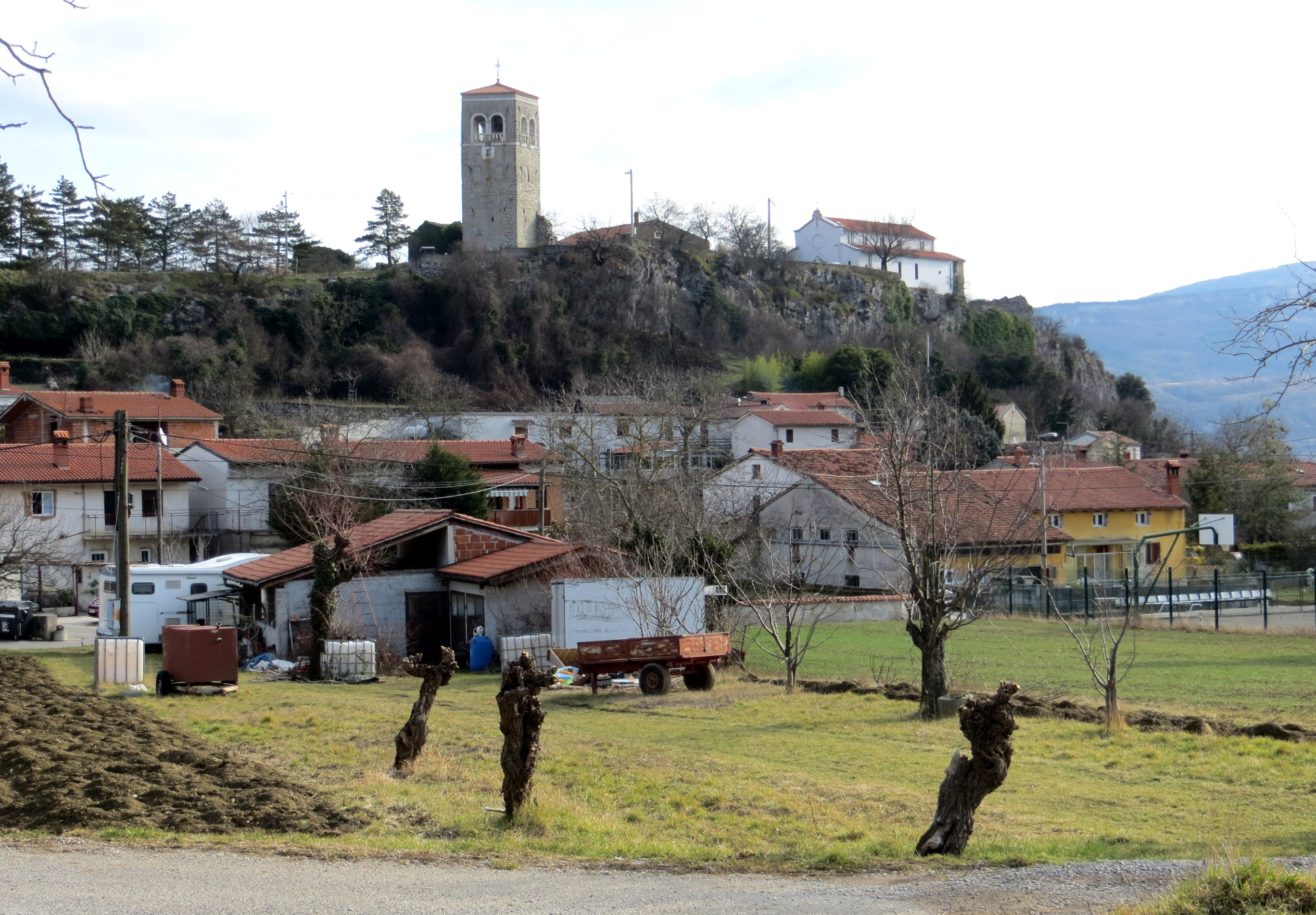

- Location in Slovenia
- Coordinates: 45°31′11.51″N 13°52′11.82″E
- Country: Slovenia
- Traditional region: Littoral
- Statistical region: Coastal–Karst
- Municipality: Koper

Area
  - Total: 6.58 km^{2} (2.54 sq mi)
- Elevation: 232.9 m (764 ft)

Population (2002)
  - Total: 165

Kubed (pronounced [ˈkuːbɛt]; Italian: Covedo) is a village in the City Municipality of Koper in the Littoral region of Slovenia.

== Churches ==
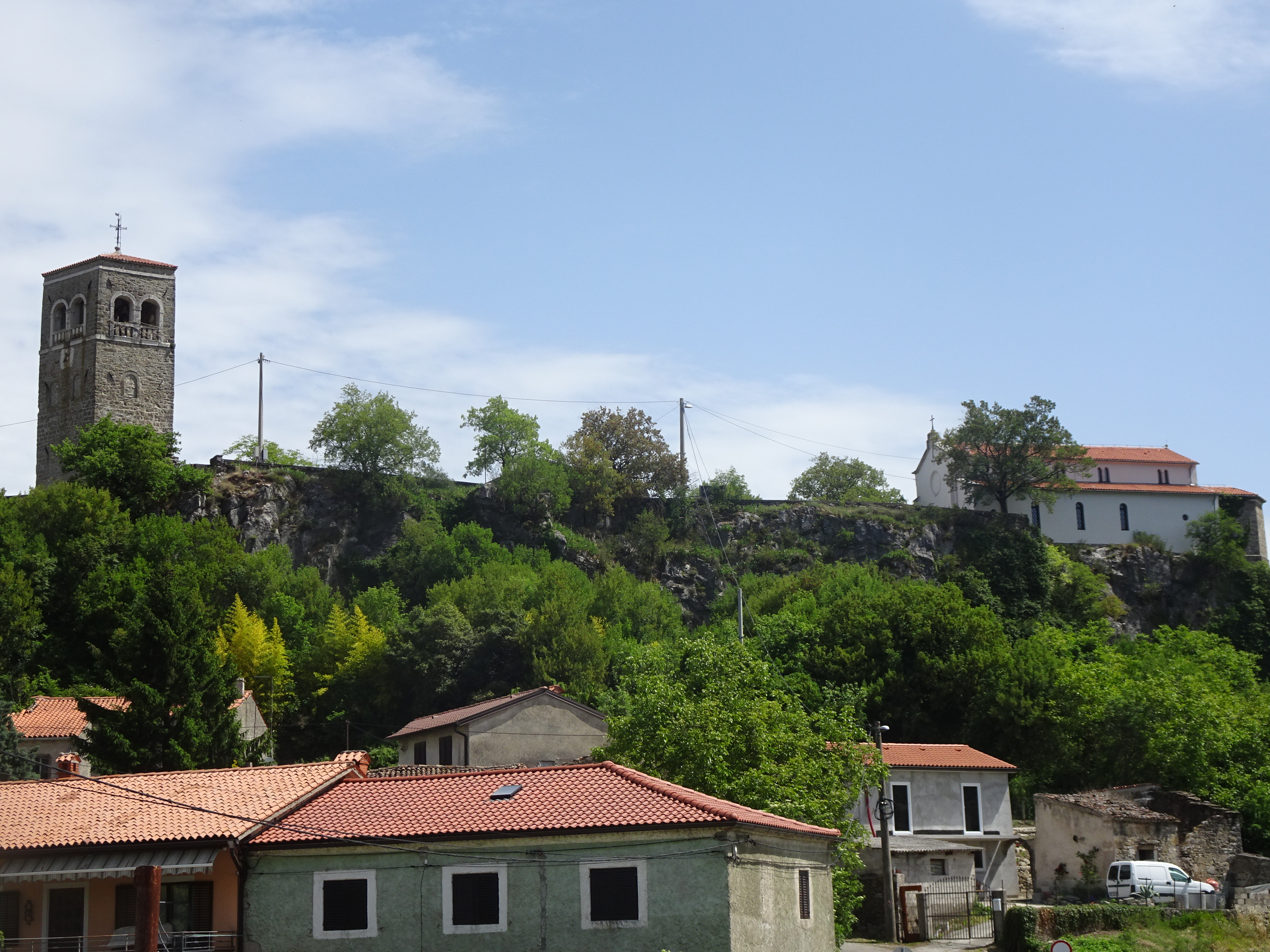
Saint Florian's church with separate bell tower

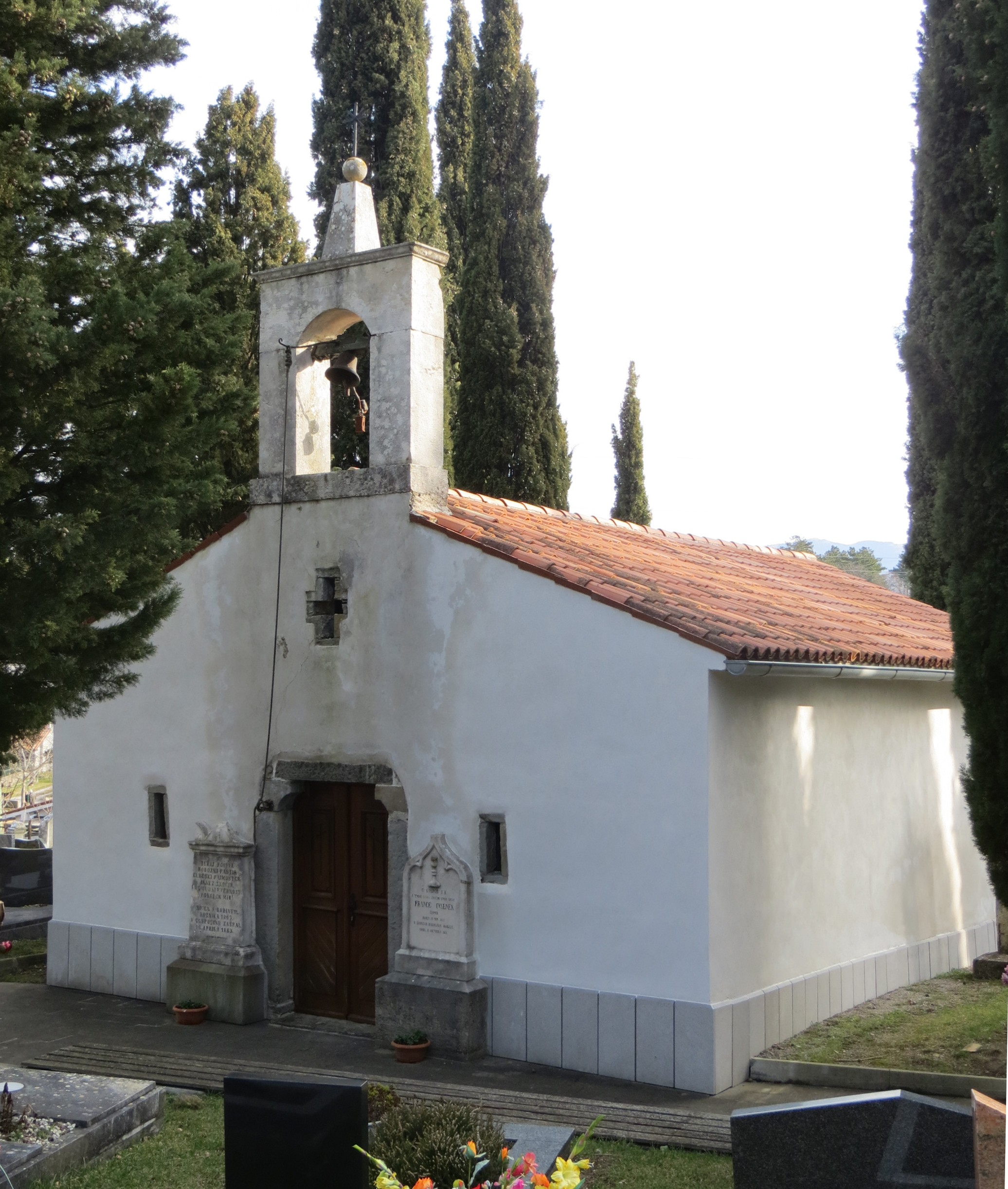
Archangel Michael's Chapel

Churches in Kubed

The former parish church in the settlement is dedicated to Saint Florian and there is a small chapel dedicated to Archangel Michael next to the cemetery outside the village.
