= San Dorligo della Valle =

San Dorligo della Valle Dolina (Slovene)
- Comune
- Comune di San Dorligo della Valle; Občina Dolina
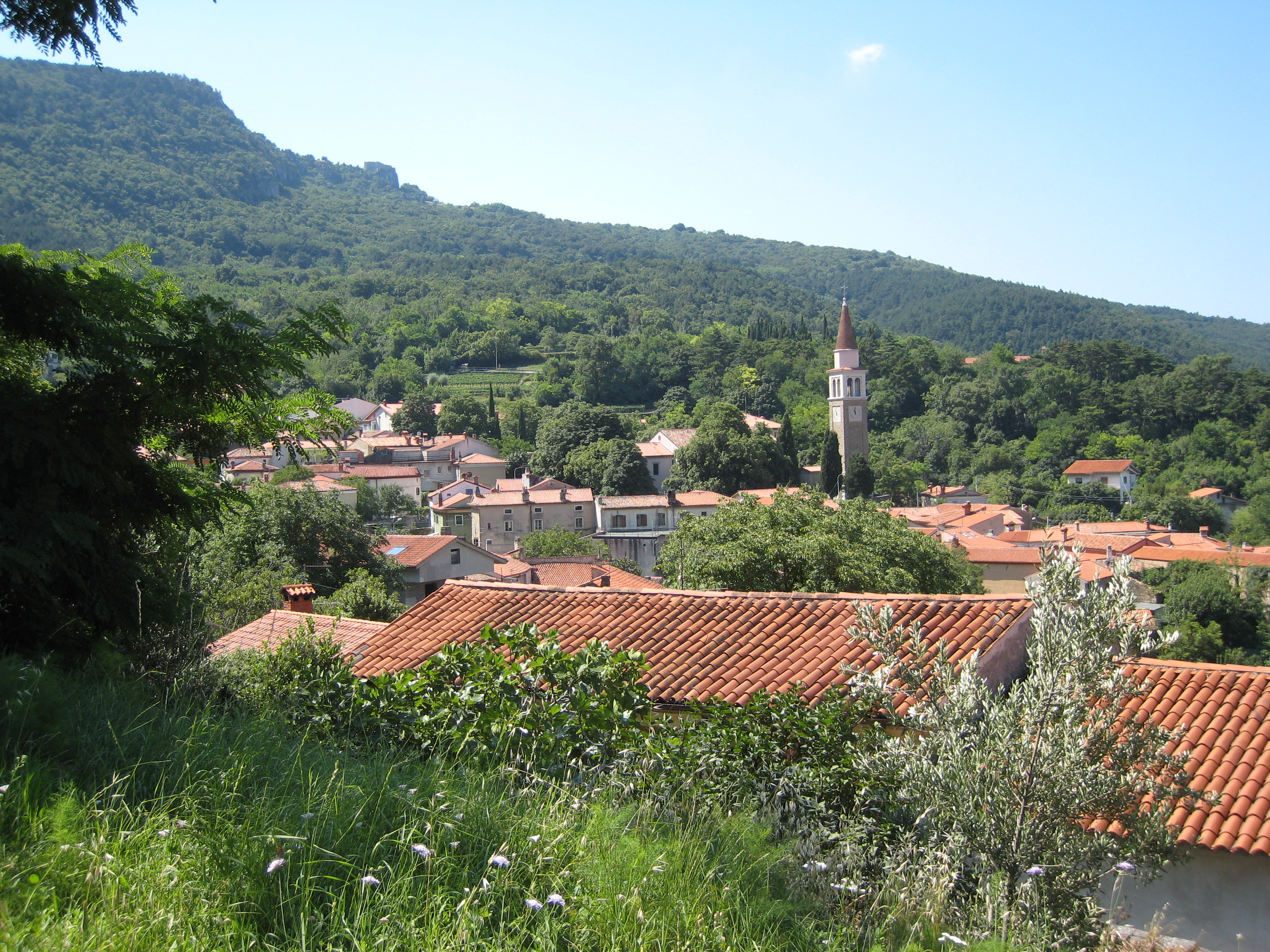
- Dolina

- Location within Italy Location within Friuli-Venezia Giulia
- Coordinates: 45°37′N 13°51′E
- Country: Italy
- Region: Friuli-Venezia Giulia
- Province: Trieste (TS)
- Frazioni: Bagnoli della Rosandra (Boljunec), Bottazzo (Botač), Caresana (Mačkolje), Crociata (Križpot), Domio (Domjo), Draga, Francovez (Frankovec), Grozzana (Gročana), Hervati (Hrvati), Lacotisce (Lakotišče), Log, Mattonaia (Krmenka), Pesek, Prebeneg, Puglie di Domio (Domjansko pulje), Sant'Antonio in Bosco (Boršt), Dolina, San Giuseppe della Chiusa (Ricmanje), San Lorenzo (Jezero)

Government
  - Mayor: Sandy Klun

Area
  - Total: 24.5 km^{2} (9.5 sq mi)

Population (Dec. 2004)
  - Total: 6,019
  - Density: 246/km^{2} (636/sq mi)
- Time zone: UTC+1 (CET)
  - Summer (DST): UTC+2 (CEST)
- Postal code: 34018
- Dialing code: 040
- Patron saint: Ulderico
- Saint day: July 4
- Website: Official website

San Dorligo della Valle (Slovene: Dolina; Triestine: Dolina or San Dorligo) is a comune (municipality) in the Regional decentralization entity of Trieste in the Italian region of Friuli-Venezia Giulia, located about 4 kilometres (2.5 miles) southeast of Trieste, on the border with Slovenia. As of 31 December 2004, it had a population of 6,019 and an area of 24.5 square kilometres (9.5 sq mi).

== Name ==
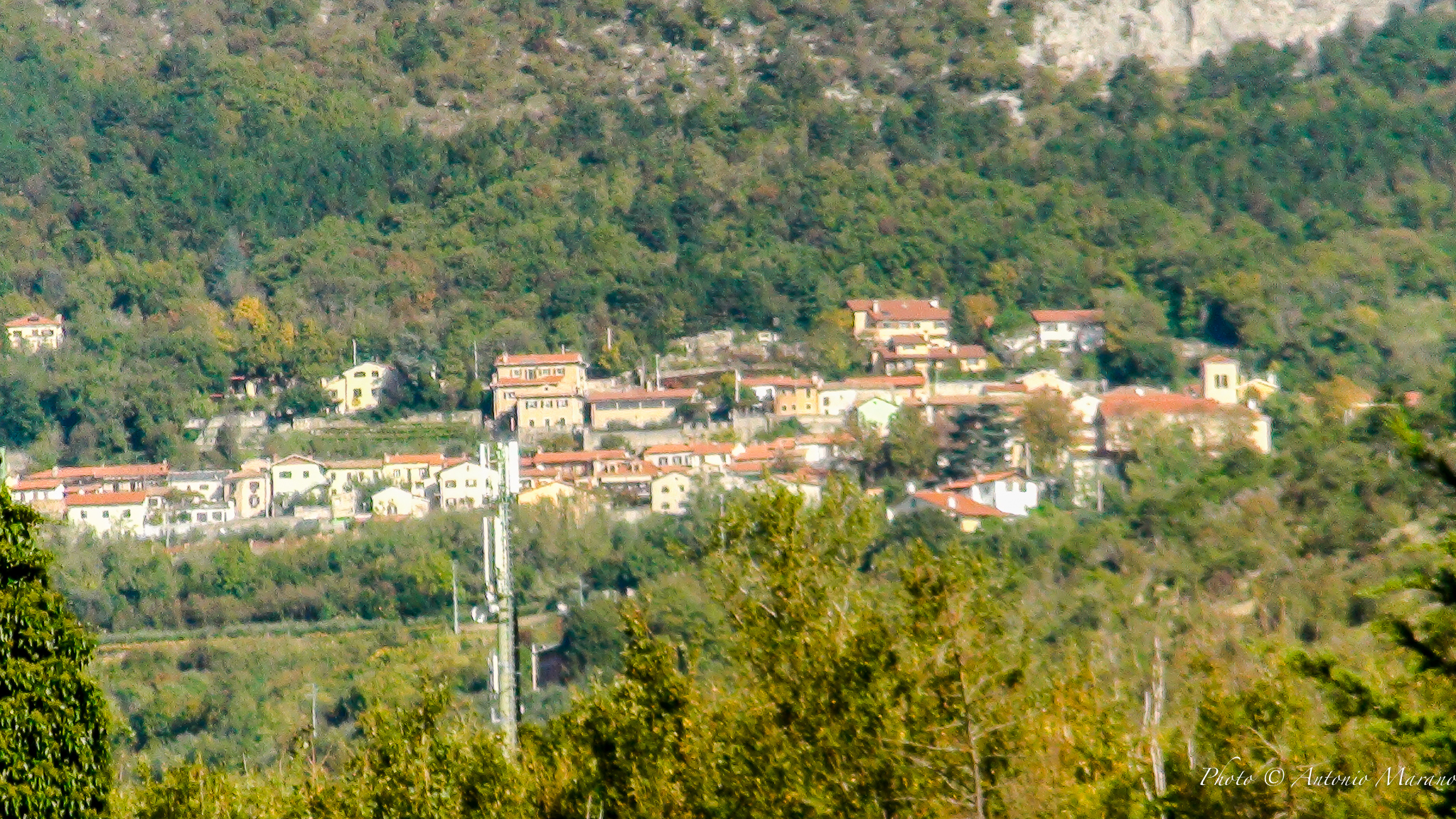
Panorama of San Dorligo della Valle

The Slovene name of the town, Dolina, means 'valley'. This was the official name in Italian, as well, until it was renamed to San Dorligo Della Valle in 1923, as part of the policies of Fascist Italianization. In the local Italian Triestine dialect, the village has always been referred to simply as Dolina. In 2003, the denomination Dolina was adopted as the official name of the settlement in both languages; however, the municipality is still called San Dorligo della Valle in Italian. "San Dorligo" (archaically “Durlic”) is the Tergestine dialectal form of the name of the town's patron saint, Ulrich of Augsburg (Sant'Ulderico).

== Geographical position ==
The municipality of San Dorligo is located on the peninsula of Istria with some settlements on the Karst Plateau. It enjoys a relatively mild Mediterranean climate, although the harsh and cold bora wind frequently blows in the autumn and winter months.

The municipality borders the following municipalities: Koper (Slovenia), Hrpelje-Kozina (Slovenia), Muggia, Sežana (Slovenia), and Trieste.

It has a border crossing with Slovenia at Pesek (Kozina on the Slovenian side). Another crossing is located in the village of Crociata, Caresana, with the Slovenian village of Osp in the Municipality of Koper.

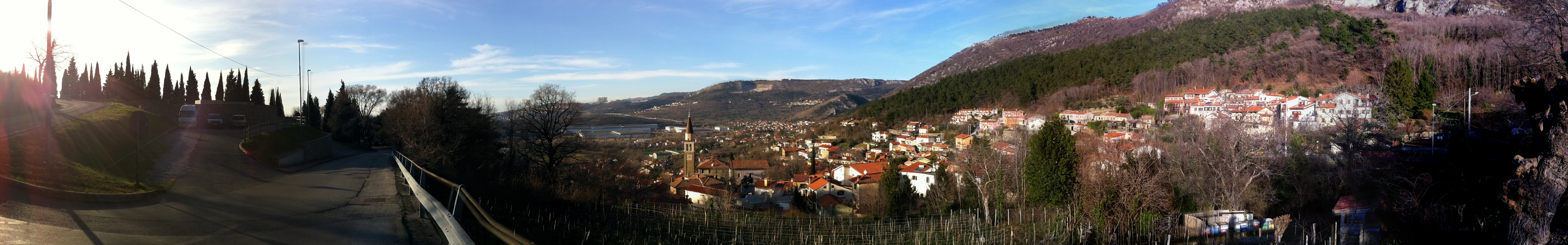
Trieste's suburbs and industrial area

== History ==
From ancient times, the town was part of the Republic of Venice. From mid 18th century to 1918, the area was under the Habsburg Empire. From 1813 to 1918, the area around San Dorligo was part of the County of Istria in the Austrian Littoral. The great majority (almost the totality) of the population was Slovene-speaking. After World War One, the area was annexed by the Kingdom of Italy, and was included in the administrative region known as the Julian March. In 1945, it was shortly occupied by the Yugoslav People's Army and later by the US and British Armies. Between 1947 and 1954, it was part of the Zone A of the Free Territory of Trieste. In 1954, it came again under Italian jurisdiction.

== Culture and traditions ==
Home of a spring festival known as the Majenca (held in May) which culminates in the falling of a cherry tree, tied to the top of a tall pole.

San Dorligo is home to the variety of olive tree called bianchera istriana in Italian and istrska belica in Slovene (both meaning "the Istrian white"), known for its endurance to harsh climate and its gentle and high quality olive oil.

Most of the locals speak two Slovenian dialects from the Littoral dialect group: in the majority of the municipality, the Rižana subdialect of the Istrian dialect is spoken, while in some villages in the northern part of the municipality, the Inner Carniolan dialect is spoken.

== Demographic evolution ==
Historical population

Year	Pop.	±%
1861	?	—
1871	?	—
1881	?	—
1901	?	—
1911	?	—

Year	Pop.	±%
1921	5,090	—
1931	4,897	−3.8%
1936	5,017	+2.5%
1951	4,821	−3.9%
1961	5,175	+7.3%

Year	Pop.	±%
1971	5,683	+9.8%
1981	6,159	+8.4%
1991	5,956	−3.3%
2001	5,927	−0.5%

Source: Data from ISTAT

== See also ==
- Slovene Lands
- Slovene minority in Italy
