= Strunjan =

Strunjan Strugnano (Italian)
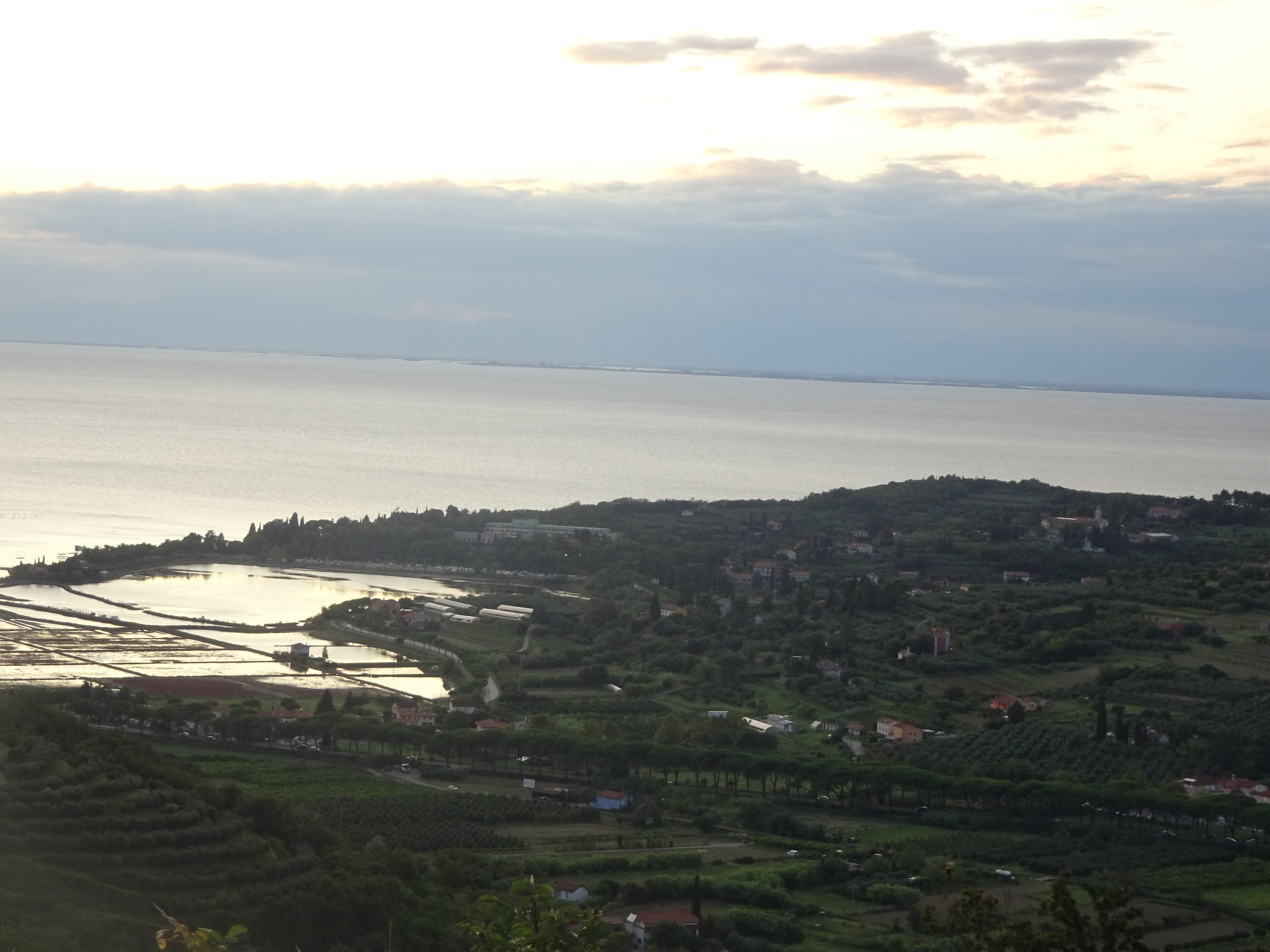
- Strunjan

- Location in Slovenia
- Coordinates: 45°32′2.61″N 13°36′24.5″E
- Country: Slovenia
- Traditional region: Slovenian Littoral
- Statistical region: Coastal–Karst
- Municipality: Piran

Area
  - Total: 3.51 km^{2} (1.36 sq mi)
- Elevation: 37.7 m (124 ft)

Population (2023)
  - Total: 659

Strunjan (pronounced [stɾuˈnjaːn]; Italian: Strugnano) is a settlement in the Municipality of Piran in the Littoral region of Slovenia.

== Geography ==
The Strunjan Nature Reserve, located along a 4 km stretch of Adriatic coast to the north of the settlement, is the longest section of unspoiled coastline in the entire Gulf of Trieste.

== Marian apparition ==
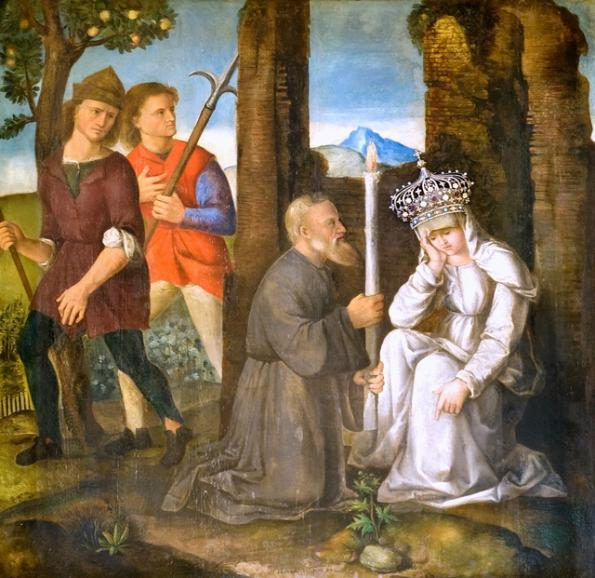

The former monastic church, now the parish church, in the settlement is dedicated to the Marian apparition at this place, in the night of August 14, 1512.

== Events ==
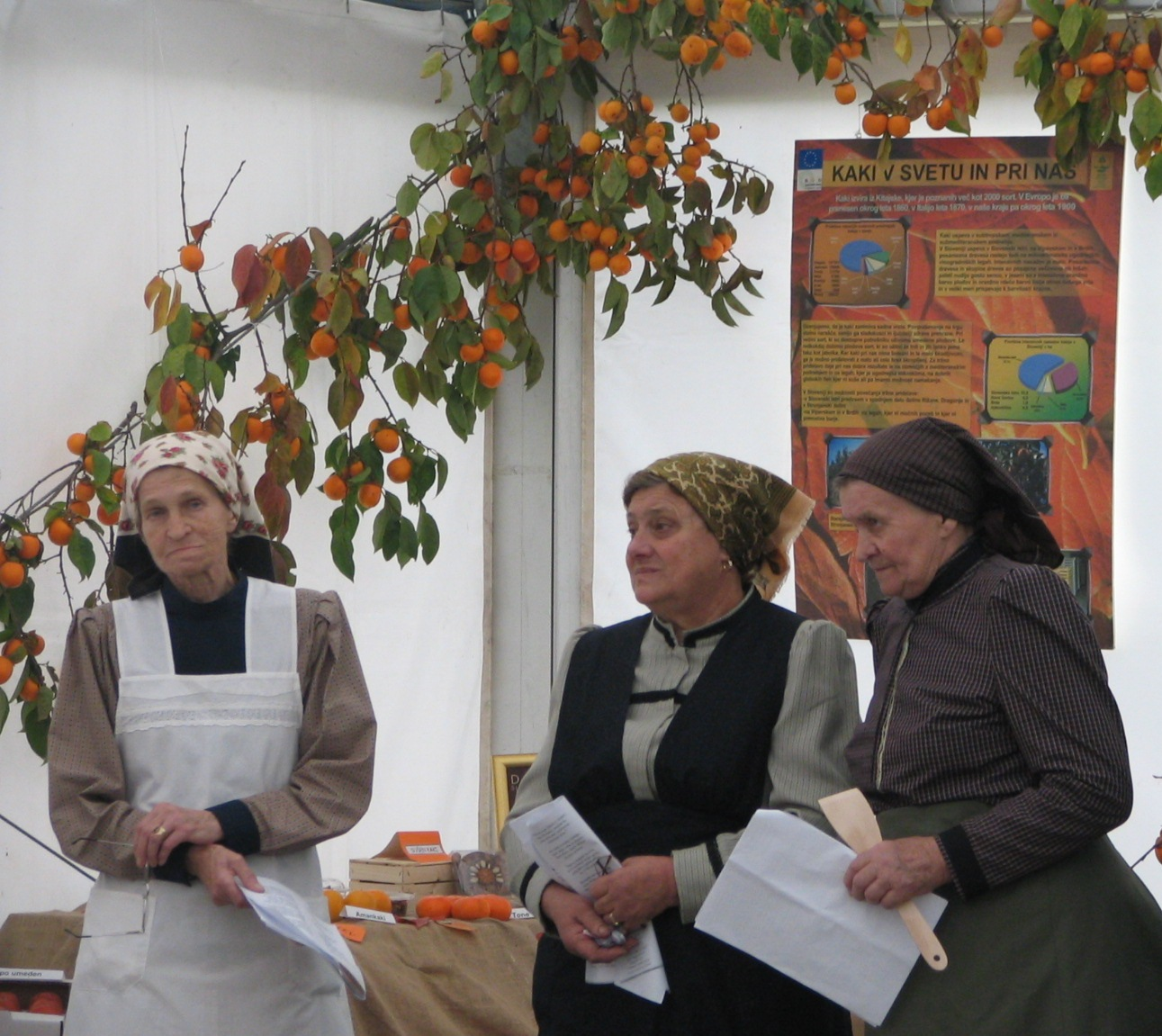
Persimmon Festival, 2005

Since 2001, Strunjan has held an annual persimmon festival (Slovene: Praznik kakijev) every November. Together with the Vipava Valley and the Gorizia Hills, Strunjan has a favorable microclimate for persimmon cultivation, producing 30% of Slovenia's annual persimmon crop on about 20 hectares.
