= Spodnje Škofije =

Spodnje Škofije Scoffie Prva Škofija
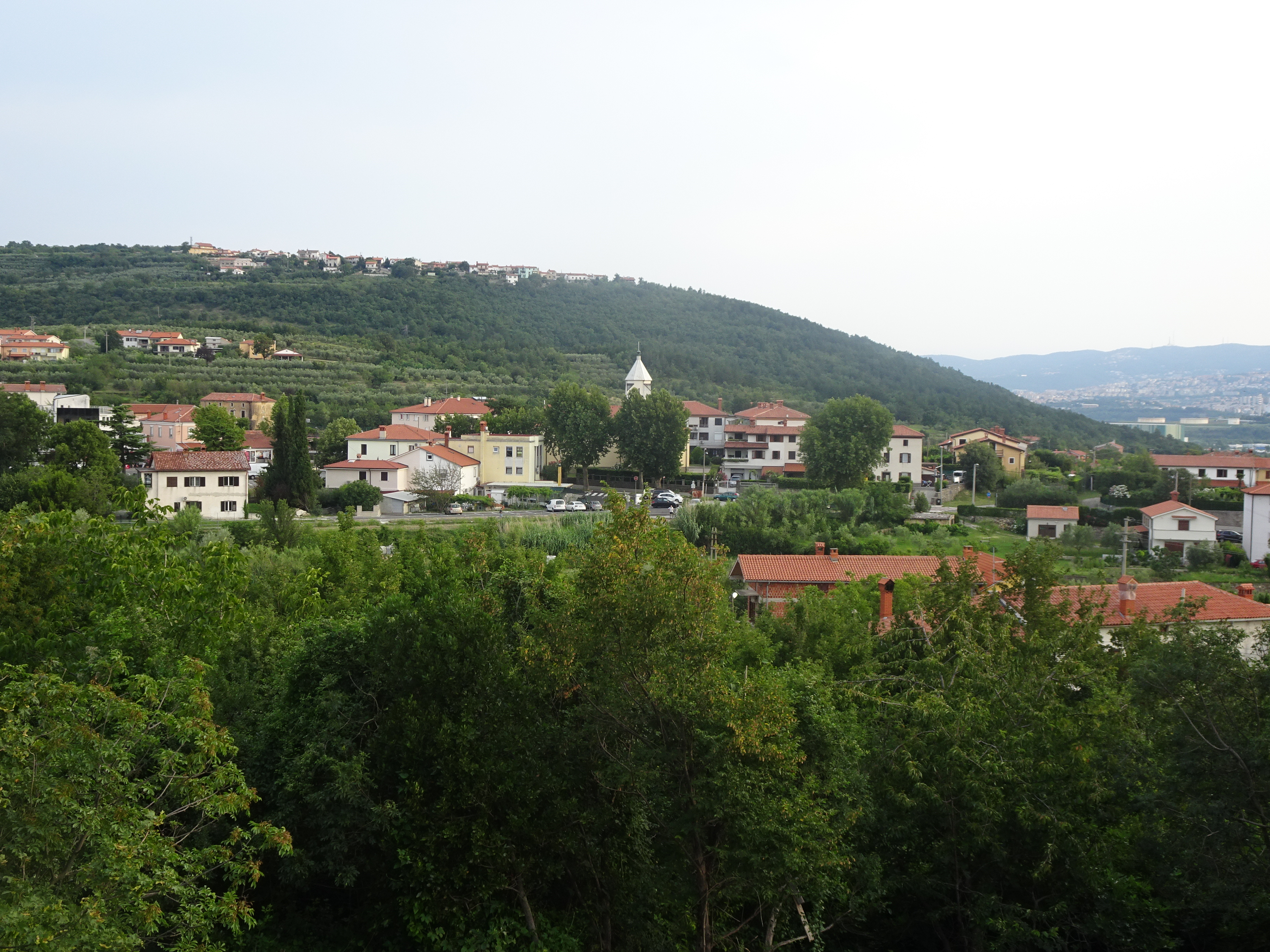

- Location in Slovenia
- Coordinates: 45°34′17.82″N 13°47′29.96″E
- Country: Slovenia
- Traditional region: Littoral
- Statistical region: Coastal–Karst
- Municipality: Koper

Area
  - Total: 3.85 km^{2} (1.49 sq mi)
- Elevation: 76.2 m (250 ft)

Population (2002)
  - Total: 1,221

Spodnje Škofije (pronounced [ˈspoːdnjɛ ʃkɔˈfiːjɛ]; locally also Prva Škofija, Italian: Scoffie; former Italian name: Albaro Vescovà) is a settlement in the City Municipality of Koper in the Littoral region of Slovenia. A major border crossing on the Highway 5 into Italy was located here, with the Italian side known as Rabuiese.

== Name ==
The name Spodnje Škofije literally means 'lower Škofije' (in contrast to neighboring Zgornje Škofije; literally, 'upper Škofije'). Spodnje Škofije is also known locally as Prva Škofija 'first Škofija' ('second', 'third', and 'fourth' Škofija are hamlets of Zgornje Škofije). The name Škofija (literally, 'diocese') is derived from the common noun škof 'bishop', and the numbering refers to tenant farms originally owned by the Diocese of Koper.

== History ==
Historically linked to Muggia (now in Italy), Spodnje Škofije was under the rule of the Patriarchs of Aquileia during most of the Middle Ages, until passing under Venetian rule in the 15th century. It remained part of the Republic of Venice until its dissolution in 1797. After that, it passed under the Habsburg monarchy and the French Empire before being absorbed into the Austrian Empire in 1813. During the Austro-Hungarian period, it was part of the province of Istria within the Austrian Littoral. According to the last Austrian census of 1910, 63.3% of the population was ethnically Slovene, and 34.6% was Istrian Italians. After World War I, it became part of Italy and it was incorporated into the Province of Trieste. After the war, it was part of the Free Territory of Trieste and it was under Anglo-American military administration until 1954, when it was ceded to Yugoslavia. During the Ten Day War, fighting between the Yugoslav federal army and Slovenian defense forces took place near Škofije.

== Church ==
The parish church in the settlement is dedicated to the Sacred Heart.
