= Grintovec, Koper =

Grintovec Montetoso
- Location in Slovenia
- Coordinates: 45°30′7.75″N 13°41′37.82″E
- Country: Slovenia
- Traditional region: Littoral
- Statistical region: Coastal–Karst
- Municipality: Koper

Area
  - Total: 2.75 km^{2} (1.06 sq mi)
- Elevation: 218.7 m (718 ft)

Population (2002)
  - Total: 83

Grintovec (pronounced [ˈɡɾiːntɔʋəts]; Italian: Montetoso) is a small settlement west of Šmarje in the City Municipality of Koper in the Littoral region of Slovenia. Grintovec lies along Route 11 between Koper and Dragonja, near Srgaši.
