= Smokvica, Koper =

Smokvica Figarola
- Location in Slovenia
- Coordinates: 45°29′31.5″N 13°54′0.21″E
- Country: Slovenia
- Traditional region: Littoral
- Statistical region: Coastal–Karst
- Municipality: Koper

Area
  - Total: 3.72 km^{2} (1.44 sq mi)
- Elevation: 279.4 m (917 ft)

Population (2002)
  - Total: 34

Smokvica (pronounced [ˈsmoːkʋitsa]; Italian: Figarola) is a village in the City Municipality of Koper in the Littoral region of Slovenia.

The local church is dedicated to Mary Magdalene and belongs to the Parish of Movraž.
