= Župančiči =

Župančiči Zupancici
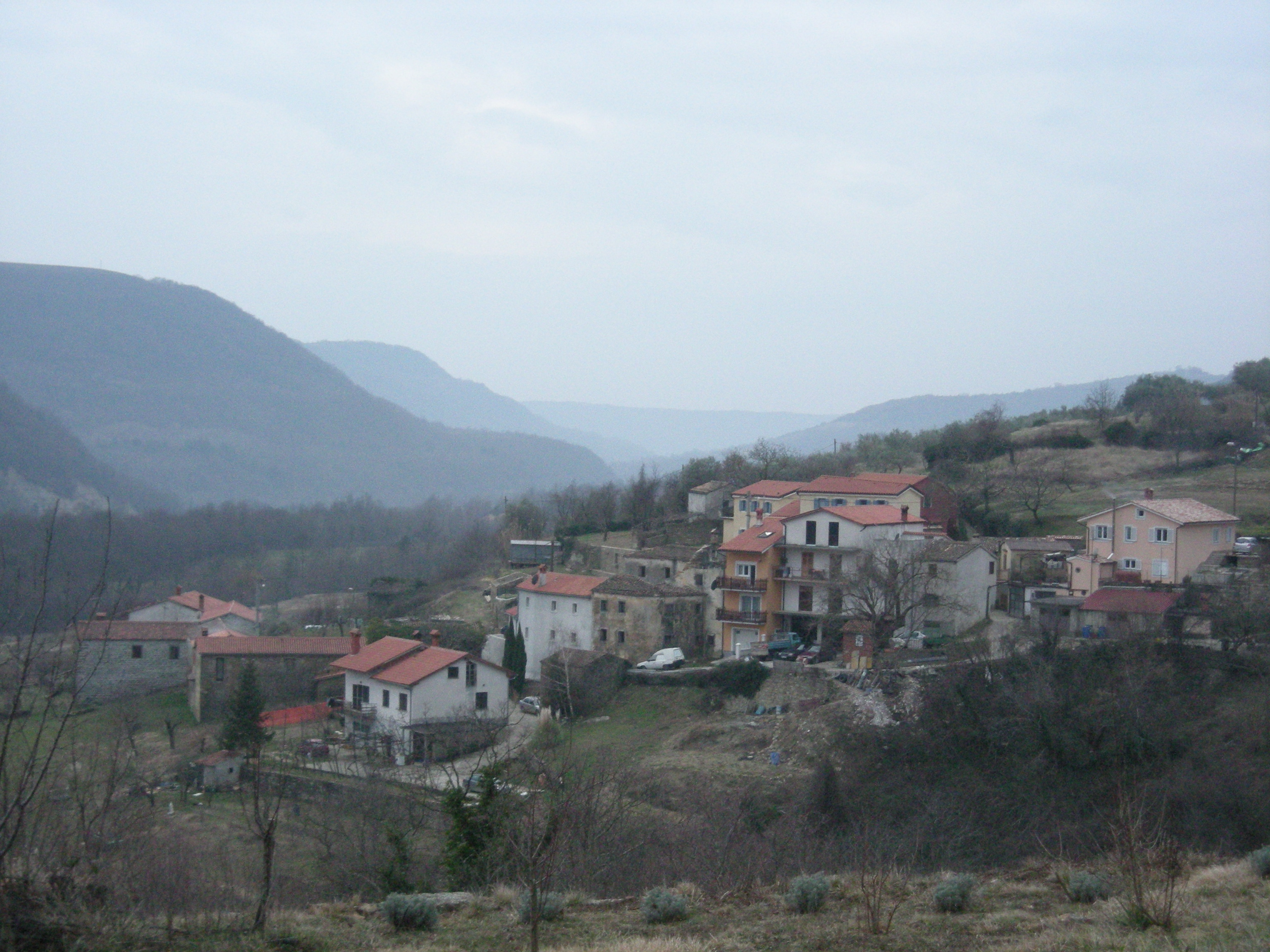

- Location in Slovenia
- Coordinates: 45°28′59.06″N 13°46′0.06″E
- Country: Slovenia
- Traditional region: Littoral
- Statistical region: Coastal–Karst
- Municipality: Koper

Area
  - Total: 1.74 km^{2} (0.67 sq mi)
- Elevation: 143.1 m (469 ft)

Population (2002)
  - Total: 34

Župančiči (pronounced [ʒuˈpaːntʃitʃi], Italian: Zupancici) is a small settlement in the City Municipality of Koper in the Littoral region of Slovenia.

== Geography ==
Župančiči is located in a narrow valley above the right bank of the Rokava River. There are fertile tilled fields in the valley, and the surrounding slopes have pastures, meadows, and sparse woods.

== Name ==
The name Župančiči is plural, presumably referring to former residents with the surname Župančič. The surname is derived from the common noun župan, referring to a local leader, and has given rise to other toponyms, such as Županje Njive. Locally, the village is known as Flegi.
