= Galantiči =

Galantiči Galantici
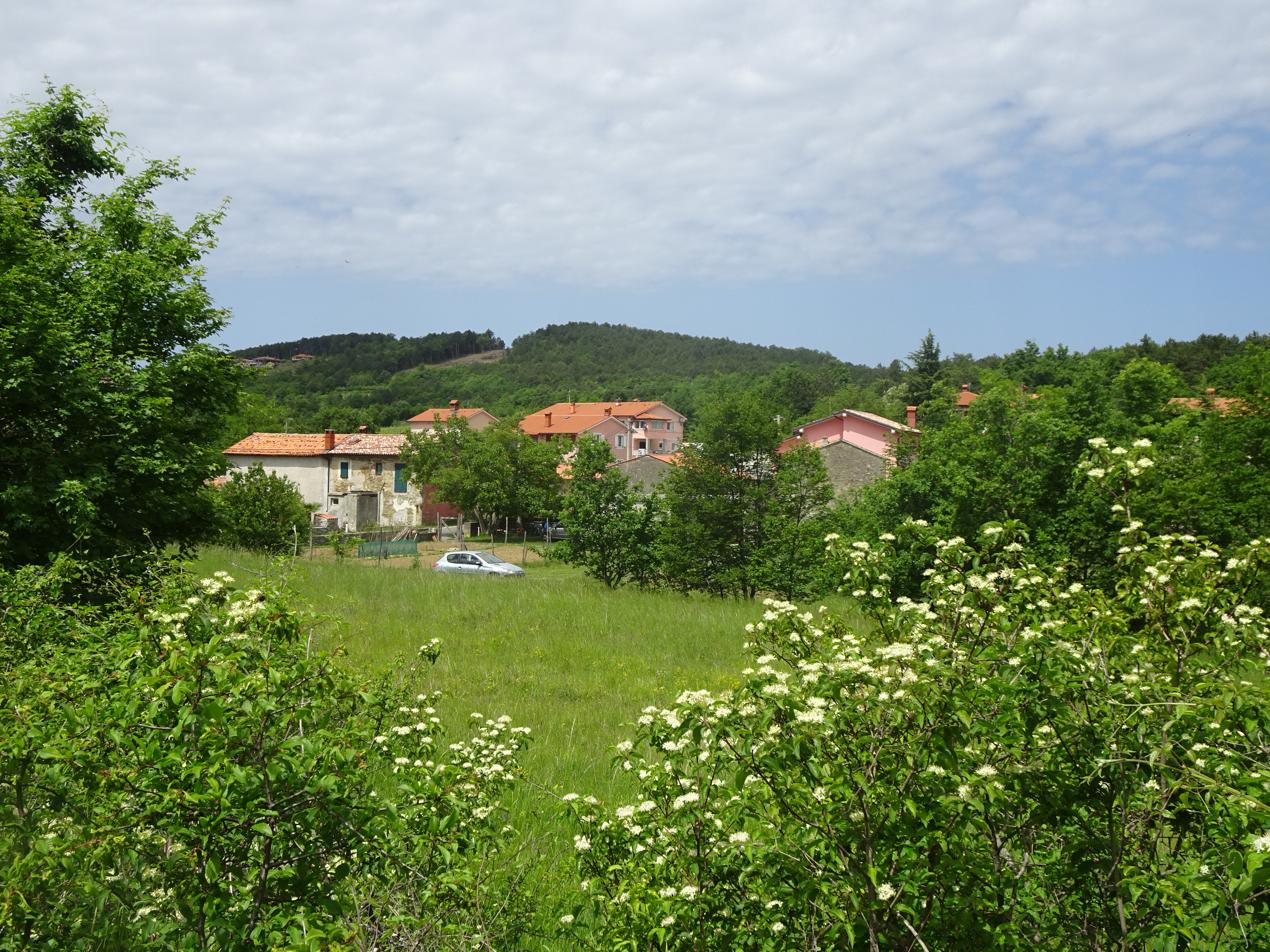

- Location in Slovenia
- Coordinates: 45°29′40.88″N 13°52′19.62″E
- Country: Slovenia
- Traditional region: Littoral
- Statistical region: Coastal–Karst
- Municipality: Koper

Area
  - Total: 0.67 km^{2} (0.26 sq mi)
- Elevation: 330.2 m (1,083 ft)

Population (2002)
  - Total: 18

Galantiči (pronounced [ɡaˈlaːntitʃi]; Italian: Galantici) is a small settlement south of Kubed in the City Municipality of Koper in the Littoral region of Slovenia.

== History ==
Galantiči was a hamlet of Poletiči until 1997, when it was administratively separated and became a settlement in its own right.
