= Kampel =

Kampel may refer to:

- Kampel, Koper, a settlement south of Škocjan, Slovenia
- Kampel, Indore, a settlement in Madhya Pradesh, India
