= Kozloviči =

Kozloviči Coslovici
- Location in Slovenia
- Coordinates: 45°29′24.67″N 13°49′36.9″E
- Country: Slovenia
- Traditional region: Littoral
- Statistical region: Coastal–Karst
- Municipality: Koper

Area
  - Total: 0.76 km^{2} (0.29 sq mi)
- Elevation: 274.6 m (901 ft)

Population (2002)
  - Total: 42

Kozloviči (pronounced [kɔˈzloːʋitʃi]; Italian: Coslovici) is a small settlement in the City Municipality of Koper in the Littoral region of Slovenia.
