= Babiči =

Babiči Babici di Maresego
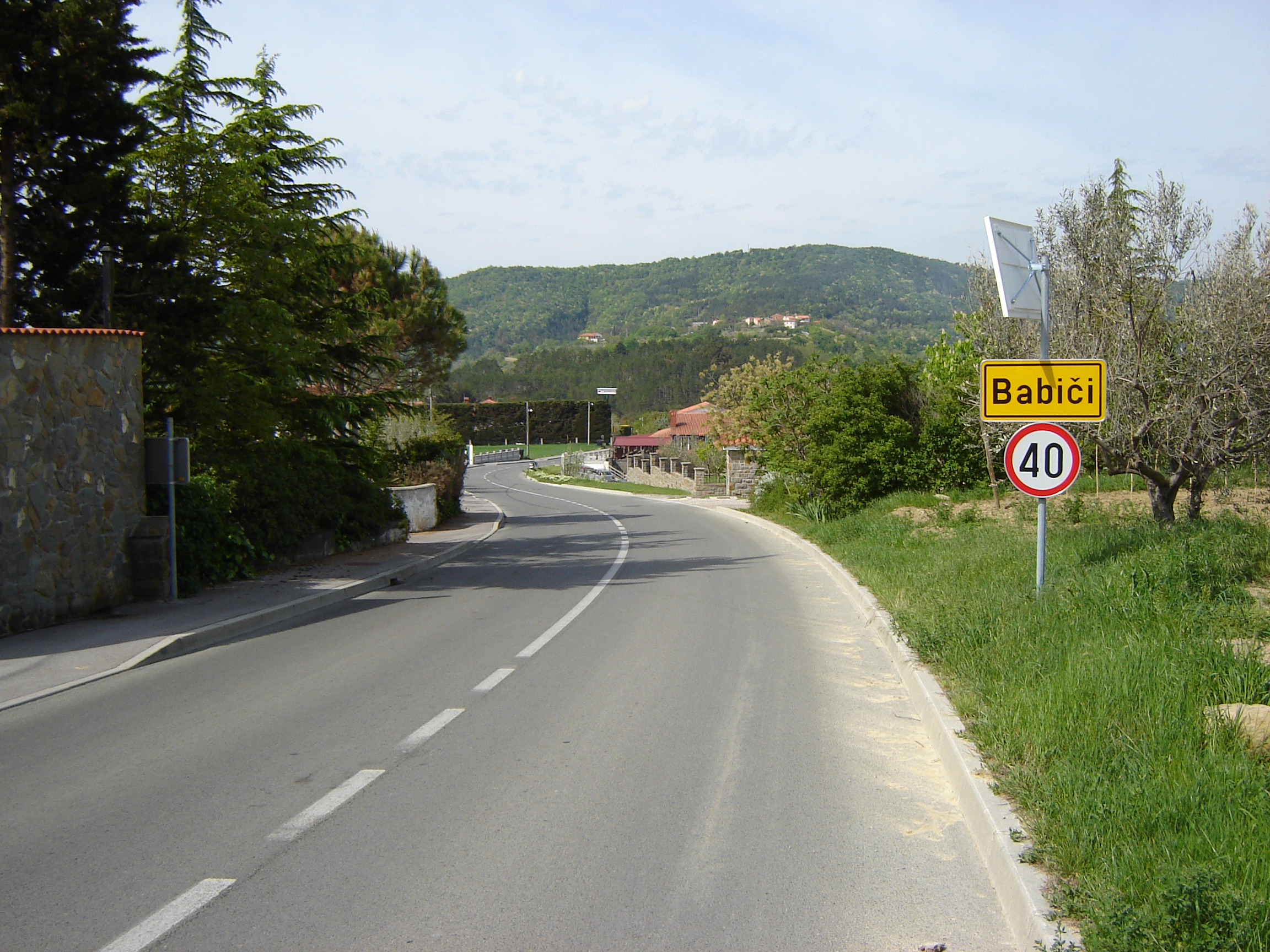
- The village of Babiči

- Location in Slovenia
- Coordinates: 45°30′11.79″N 13°46′45″E
- Country: Slovenia
- Traditional region: Littoral
- Statistical region: Coastal–Karst
- Municipality: Koper

Area
  - Total: 1.778 km^{2} (0.686 sq mi)

Population (2026)
  - Total: 305
  - Density: 172/km^{2} (450/sq mi)

Babiči (pronounced [ˈbaːbitʃi]; Italian: Babici di Maresego) is a village in the City Municipality of Koper in the Littoral region of Slovenia. In January 2026, the population was 305.

A small church on a hill above the settlement is dedicated to Saints John and Paul. It was abandoned after it was looted by German soldiers that took refuge in the church in the Second World War and it was never restored.
