= Grinjan =

Grinjan Nigrignano
- Location in Slovenia
- Coordinates: 45°30′40.62″N 13°43′46.53″E
- Country: Slovenia
- Traditional region: Littoral
- Statistical region: Coastal–Karst
- Municipality: Koper

Area
  - Total: 0.64 km^{2} (0.25 sq mi)
- Elevation: 165.9 m (544 ft)

Population (2002)
  - Total: 88

Grinjan (pronounced [ɡɾiˈnjaːn]; Italian: Nigrignano) is a settlement south of Koper in the Littoral region of Slovenia.
