= Pomjan =

Pomjan Paugnano
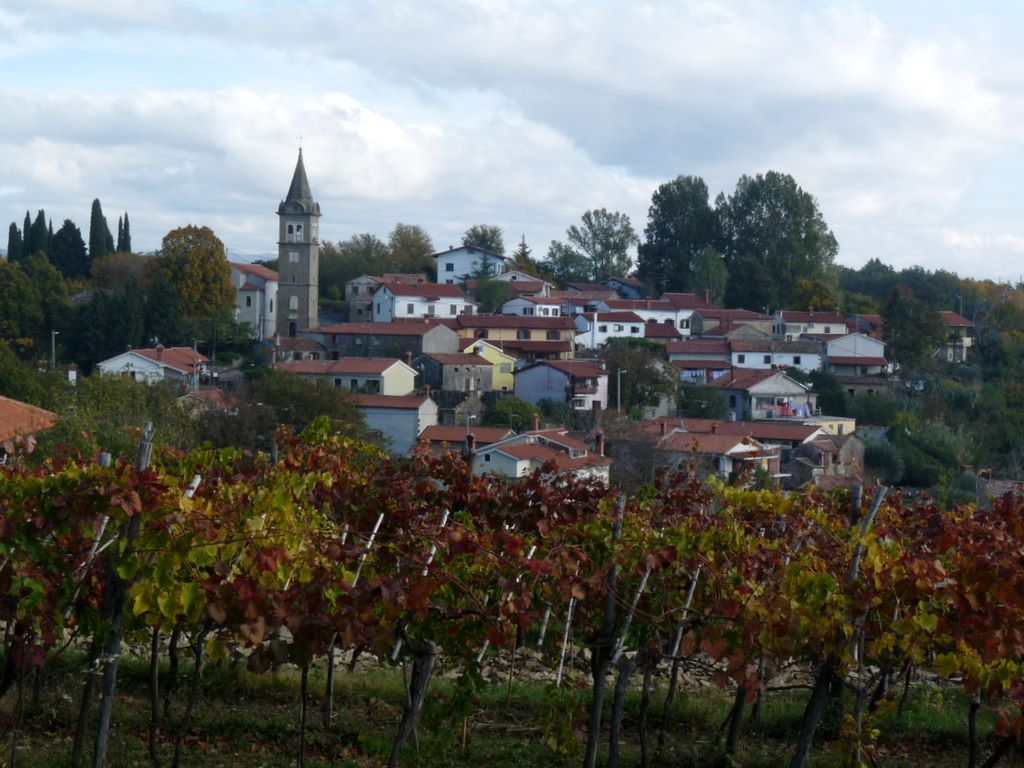

- Location in Slovenia
- Coordinates: 45°29′57.25″N 13°45′18.72″E
- Country: Slovenia
- Traditional region: Littoral
- Statistical region: Coastal–Karst
- Municipality: Koper

Area
  - Total: 3.48 km^{2} (1.34 sq mi)
- Elevation: 361.8 m (1,187 ft)

Population (2002)
  - Total: 160

Pomjan (pronounced [pɔˈmjaːn] or [ˈpoːmjan]); Italian: Paugnano) is a small village in the City Municipality of Koper in the Littoral region of Slovenia.

== Church ==
The parish church in the settlement is dedicated to Saint George.
