= Rožar =

Village in southwest Slovenia

Rožar Rosaruolo
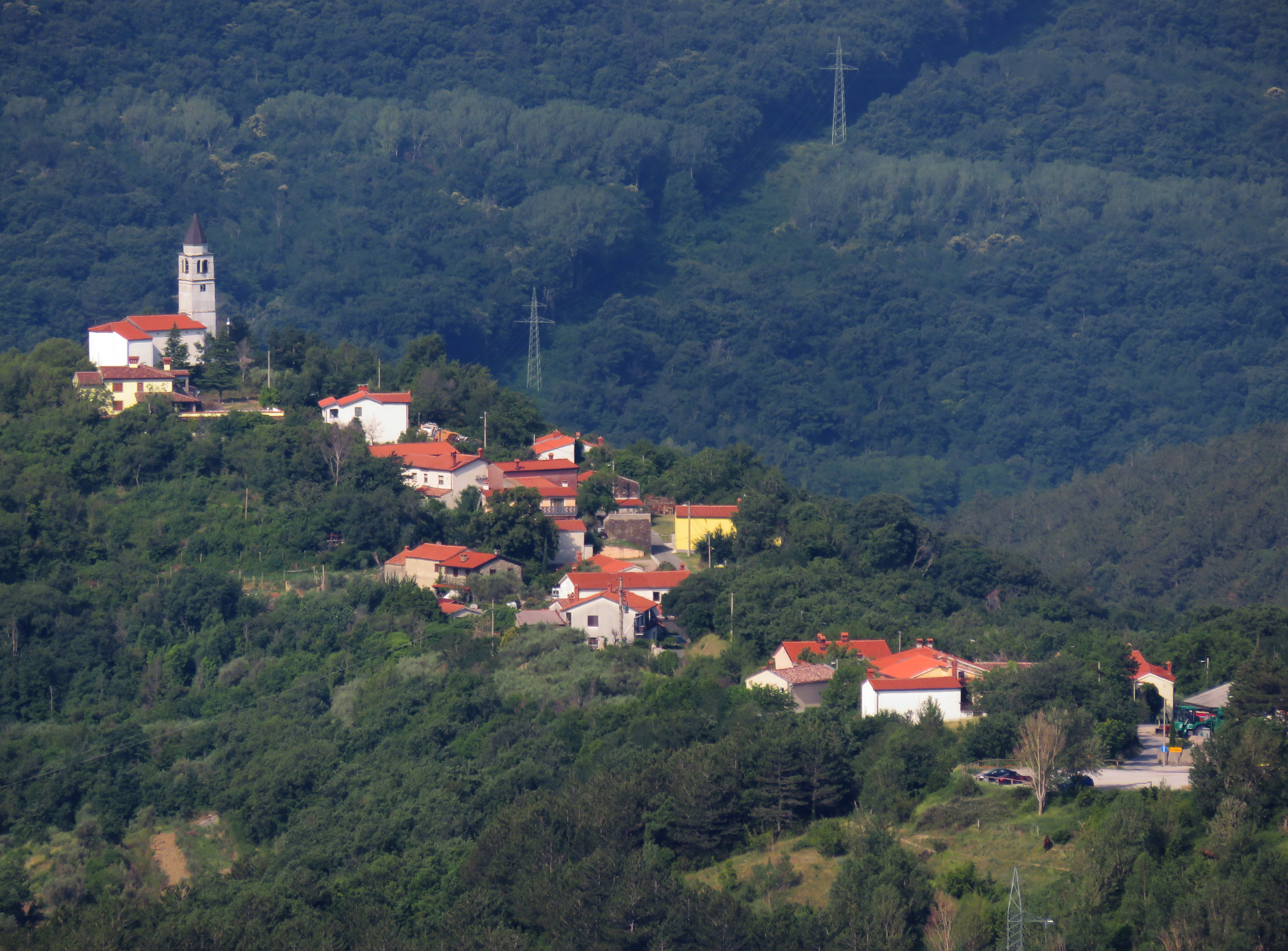

- Location in Slovenia
- Coordinates: 45°32′52.6″N 13°51′8.48″E
- Country: Slovenia
- Traditional region: Littoral
- Statistical region: Coastal–Karst
- Municipality: Koper

Area
  - Total: 0.22 km^{2} (0.085 sq mi)
- Elevation: 154.8 m (508 ft)
- 30

Rožar (pronounced [ɾɔˈʒaːɾ]; Italian: Rosaruolo, Istro-Venetian: Rosariòl) is a small village in the City Municipality of Koper in the Littoral region of Slovenia.

The local church is dedicated to Saint George and belongs to the Parish of Predloka.
