= Stepani =

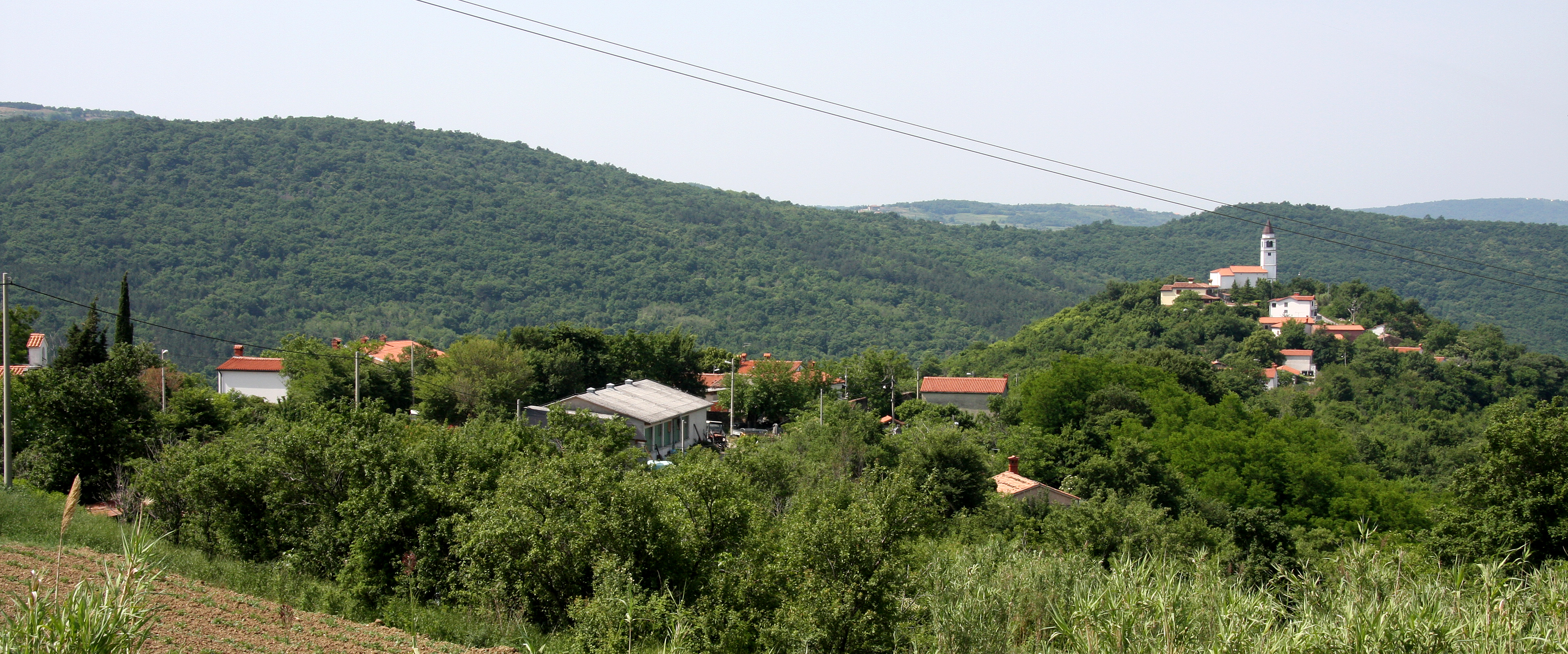

- Location in Slovenia
- Coordinates: 45°32′57.89″N 13°51′19.43″E
- Country: Slovenia
- Traditional region: Littoral
- Statistical region: Coastal–Karst
- Municipality: Koper

Area
  - Total: 1.13 km^{2} (0.44 sq mi)
- Elevation: 169.8 m (557 ft)

Population (2002)
  - Total: 15

Stepani (pronounced [ˈsteːpani] or [stɛˈpaːni]) is a small settlement in the City Municipality of Koper in the Littoral region of Slovenia.

A small church in the settlement is dedicated to Saint James and belongs to the Parish of Predloka.
