= Čentur =

Čentur Centora
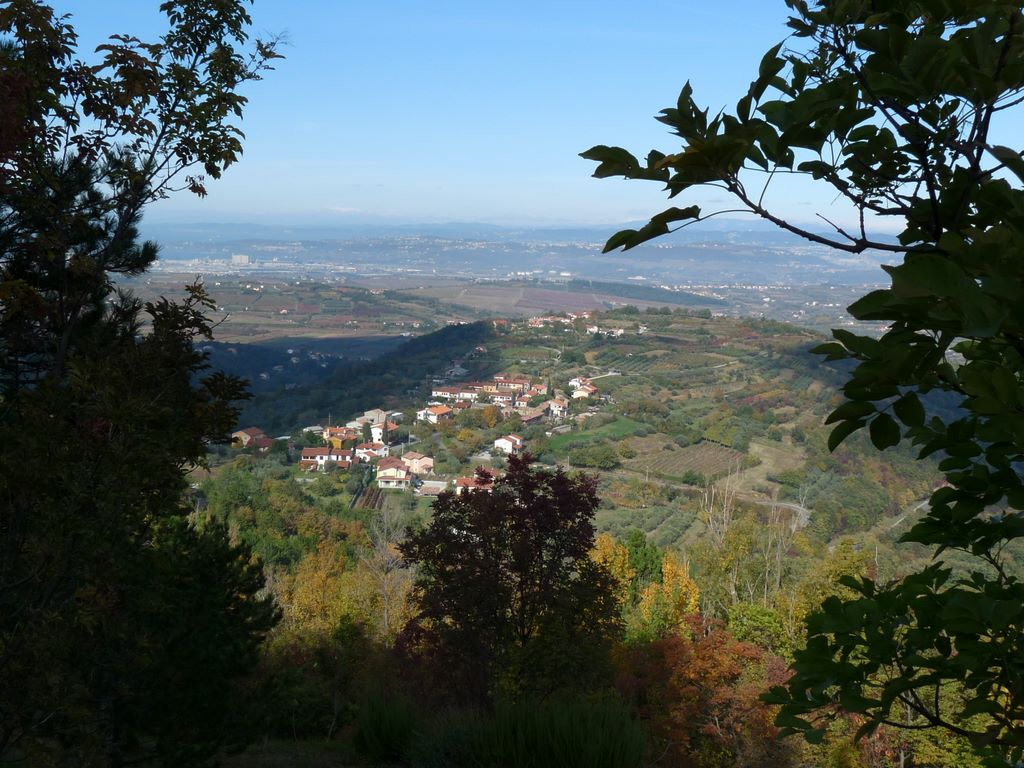

- Location in Slovenia
- Coordinates: 45°30′12.73″N 13°46′11.81″E
- Country: Slovenia
- Traditional region: Littoral
- Statistical region: Coastal–Karst
- Municipality: Koper

Area
  - Total: 0.984 km^{2} (0.380 sq mi)

Population (2026)
  - Total: 165
  - Density: 168/km^{2} (440/sq mi)

Čentur (pronounced [tʃɛnˈtuːɾ]; Italian: Centora) is a settlement 5 km southeast of Koper in the Littoral region of Slovenia. It is divided into two separate hamlets: Veliki Čentur and Mali Čentur (literally, 'big Čentur' and 'little Čentur'). As of January 2026, the population was 165.
