= Tinjan, Koper =

Tinjan Antignano
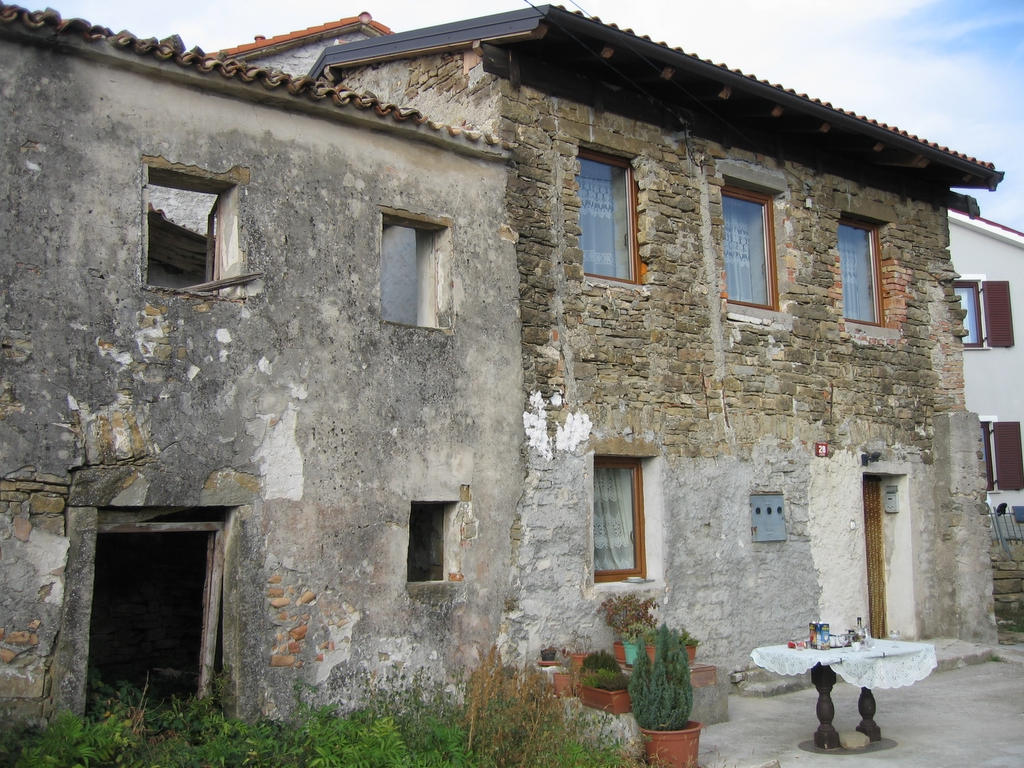

- Location in Slovenia
- Coordinates: 45°33′40.22″N 13°50′3.87″E
- Country: Slovenia
- Traditional region: Littoral
- Statistical region: Coastal–Karst
- Municipality: Koper

Area
  - Total: 4.29 km^{2} (1.66 sq mi)
- Elevation: 361.9 m (1,187 ft)

Population (2002)
  - Total: 151

Tinjan (pronounced [tiˈnjaːn]; Italian: Antignano) is a small village in the City Municipality of Koper in the Littoral region of Slovenia.

The parish church in the settlement is dedicated to Saint Michael.
