= Dvori, Koper =

Dvori Corte
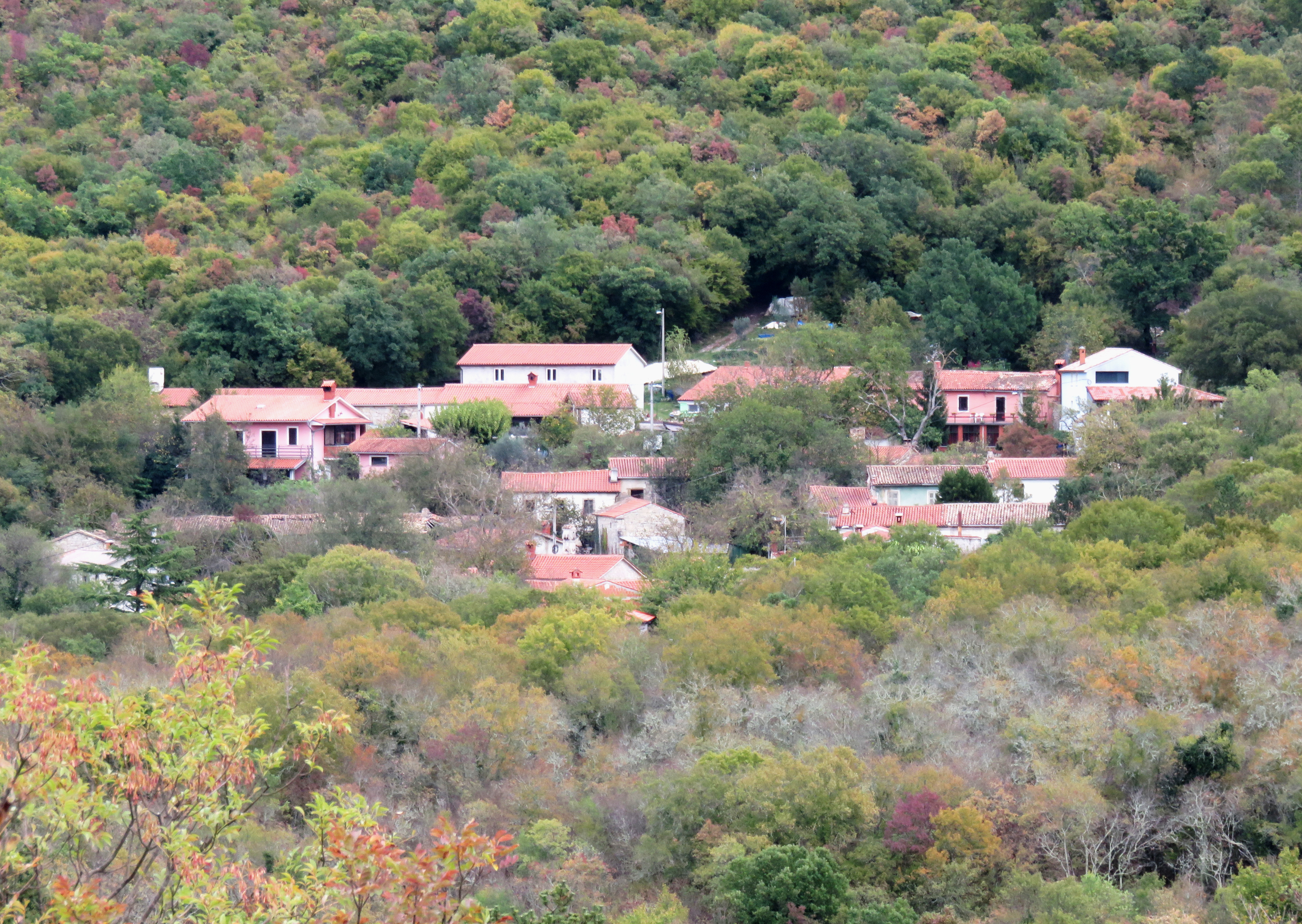

- Location in Slovenia
- Coordinates: 45°27′27.89″N 13°55′57.69″E
- Country: Slovenia
- Traditional region: Littoral
- Statistical region: Coastal–Karst
- Municipality: Koper

Area
  - Total: 4.33 km^{2} (1.67 sq mi)
- Elevation: 216.3 m (710 ft)

Population (2002)
  - Total: 26

Dvori (pronounced [ˈdʋoːɾi]; Italian: Corte) is a small settlement in the City Municipality of Koper in the Littoral region of Slovenia on the border with Croatia.
