= Sokoliči =

Sokoliči Socolici
- Location in Slovenia
- Coordinates: 45°27′51.01″N 13°52′47.12″E
- Country: Slovenia
- Traditional region: Littoral
- Statistical region: Coastal–Karst
- Municipality: Koper

Area
  - Total: 0.56 km^{2} (0.22 sq mi)
- Elevation: 272.1 m (893 ft)

Population (2002)
  - Total: 0

Sokoliči (pronounced [sɔkɔˈliːtʃi]; Italian: Socolici) is a small settlement in the City Municipality of Koper in the Littoral region of Slovenia.
