= Fijeroga =

Fijeroga Figarola di Dragogna
- Location in Slovenia
- Coordinates: 45°29′30.98″N 13°45′46.01″E
- Country: Slovenia
- Traditional region: Littoral
- Statistical region: Coastal–Karst
- Municipality: Koper

Area
  - Total: 0.63 km^{2} (0.24 sq mi)
- Elevation: 305.4 m (1,002 ft)

Population (2002)
  - Total: 21

Fijeroga (pronounced [fijɛˈɾoːɡa]; Italian: Figarola di Dragogna) is a small settlement near Koštabona in the City Municipality of Koper in the Littoral region of Slovenia.
