= Puče =

Puče Puzzole
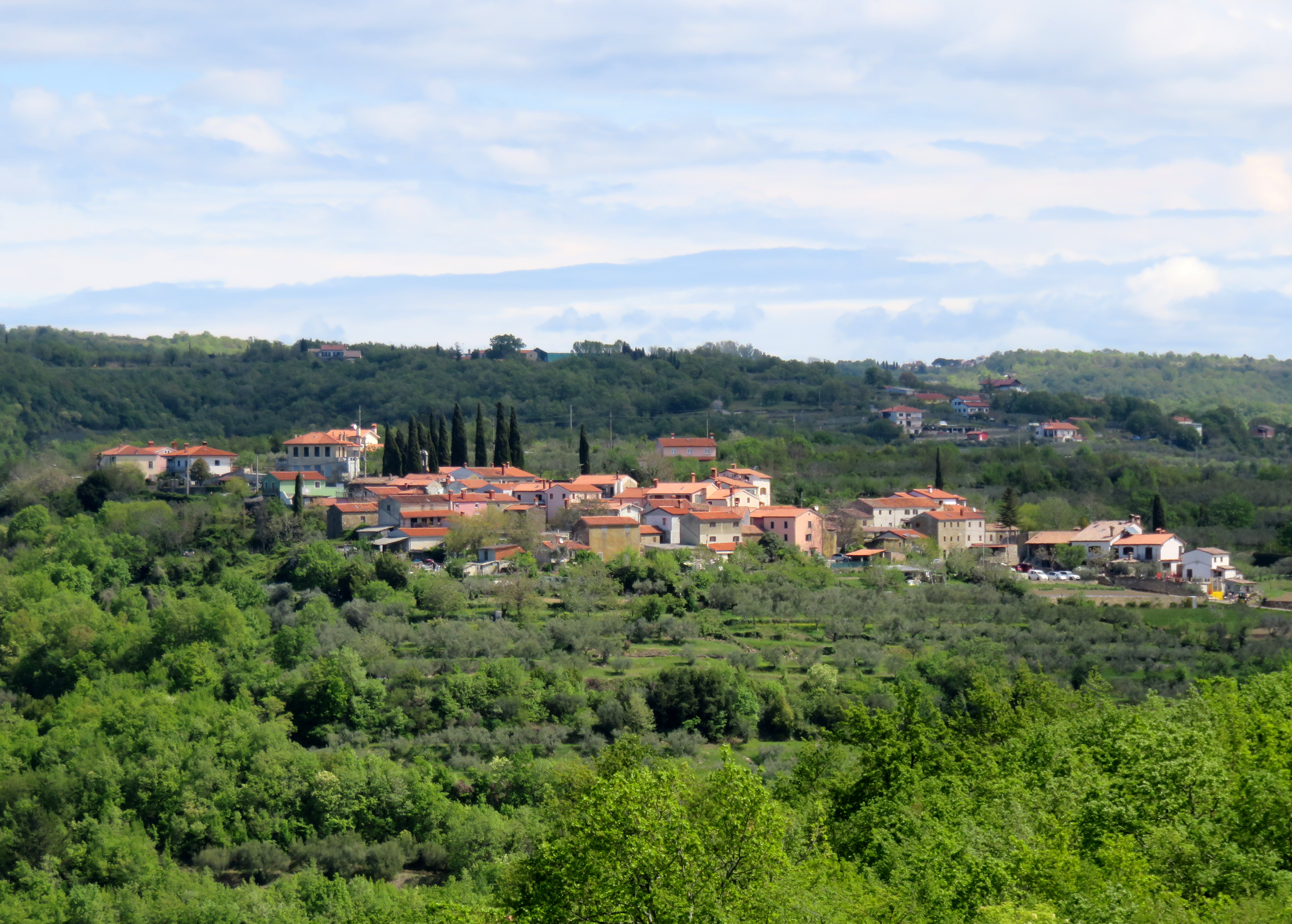

- Location in Slovenia
- Coordinates: 45°28′26.47″N 13°43′14.55″E
- Country: Slovenia
- Traditional region: Littoral
- Statistical region: Coastal–Karst
- Municipality: Koper

Area
  - Total: 4.3 km^{2} (1.7 sq mi)
- Elevation: 237.1 m (778 ft)

Population (2002)
  - Total: 201

Puče (pronounced [ˈpuːtʃɛ]; Italian: Puzzole) is a village in the City Municipality of Koper in the Littoral region of Slovenia near the border with Croatia.

A small church in the settlement is dedicated to Our Lady of Mount Carmel and belongs to the Parish of Koštabona.
