= Zanigrad =

Zanigrad Sanigrado
- Location in Slovenia
- Coordinates: 45°30′48.29″N 13°54′36.04″E
- Country: Slovenia
- Traditional region: Littoral
- Statistical region: Coastal–Karst
- Municipality: Koper

Area
  - Total: 0.92 km^{2} (0.36 sq mi)
- Elevation: 267.4 m (877 ft)

Zanigrad (pronounced [zaˈniːɡɾat]; Italian: Sanigrado) is a small settlement in the City Municipality of Koper in the Littoral region of Slovenia.

The local church is dedicated to Saint Stephen and belongs to the Parish of Predloka.
