= Montinjan =

Montinjan Montignano
- Location in Slovenia
- Coordinates: 45°31′5.58″N 13°47′47.9″E
- Country: Slovenia
- Traditional region: Littoral
- Statistical region: Coastal–Karst
- Municipality: Koper

Area
  - Total: 1.08 km^{2} (0.42 sq mi)
- Elevation: 147.7 m (485 ft)

Population (2002)
  - Total: 63

Montinjan (pronounced [mɔntiˈnjaːn]; Italian: Montignano) is a small settlement in the City Municipality of Koper in the Littoral region of Slovenia.
