= Šalara =

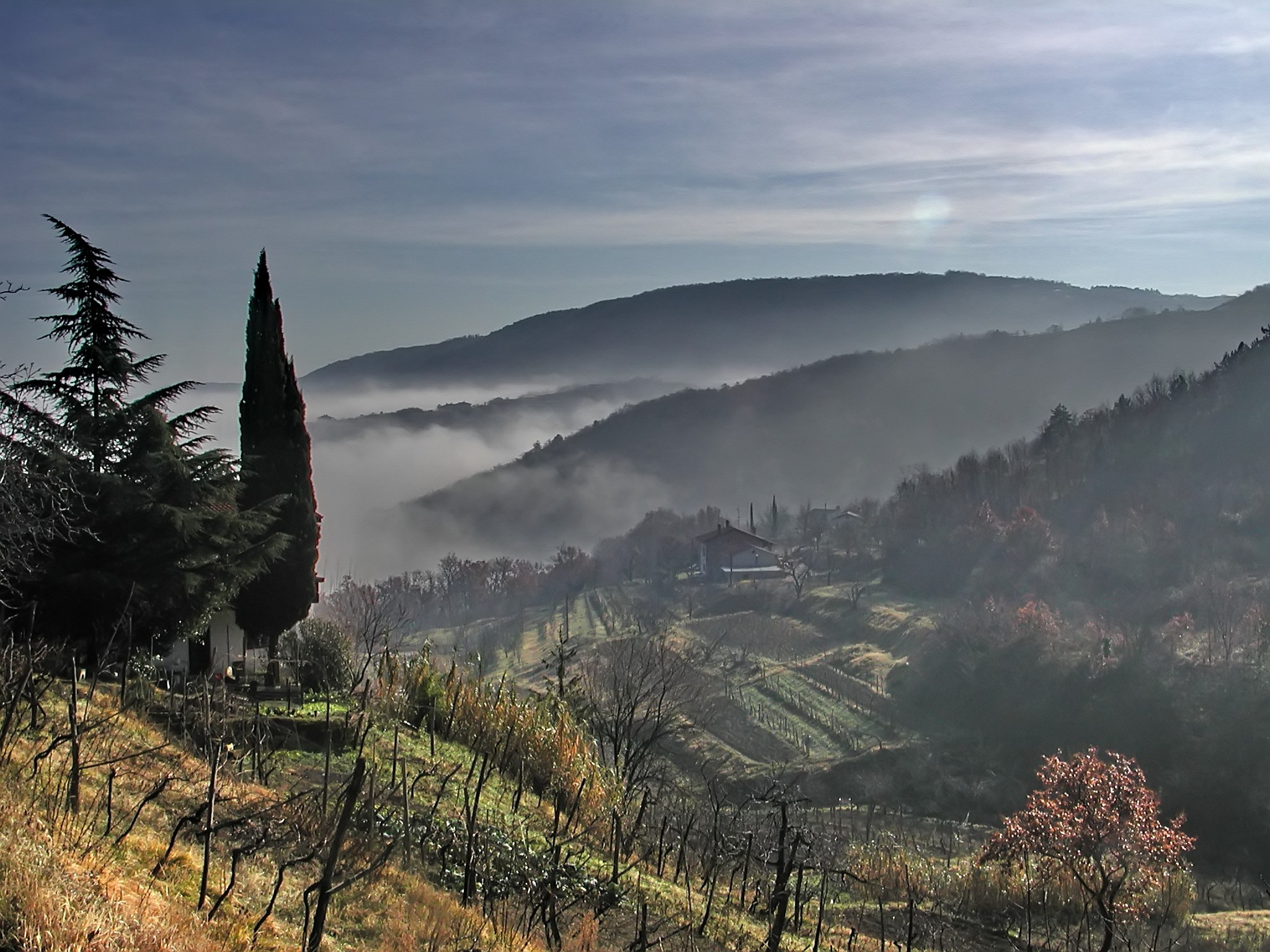

- Location in Slovenia
- Coordinates: 45°31′18.6″N 13°42′55.91″E
- Country: Slovenia
- Traditional region: Littoral
- Statistical region: Coastal–Karst
- Municipality: Koper

Area
  - Total: 2.9 km^{2} (1.1 sq mi)
- Elevation: 104.6 m (343 ft)

Population (2002)
  - Total: 430

Šalara (pronounced [ʃaˈlaːɾa]; Italian: Salara) is a settlement on the outskirts of Koper in the Littoral region of Slovenia. Old Šalara is a dispersed settlement in the hills south of Koper, while the new settlement of Šalara is part of the town itself.
