= Boršt, Koper =

Boršt Boste
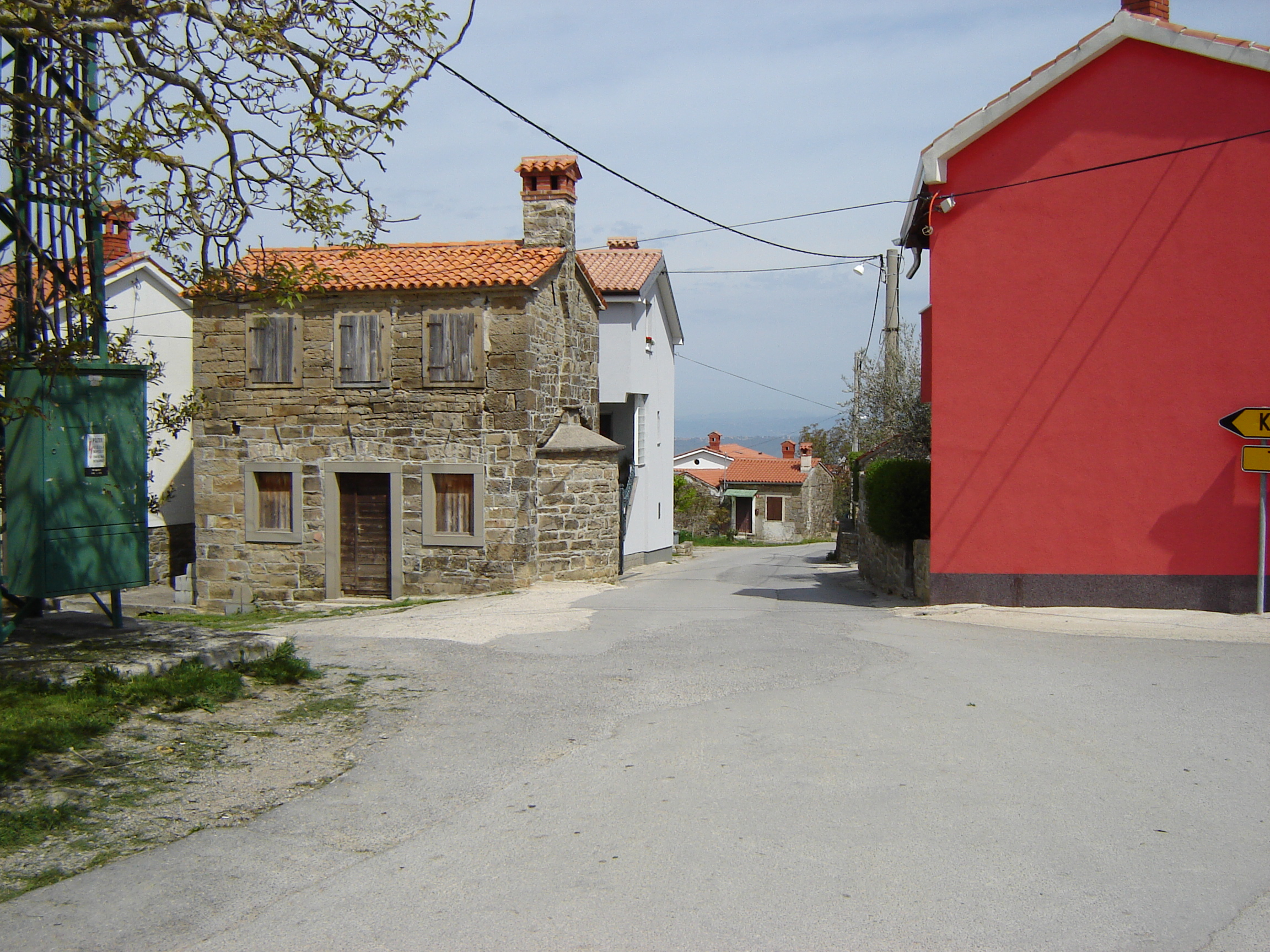
- The village of Boršt

- Location in Slovenia
- Coordinates: 45°29′7.07″N 13°47′52.72″E
- Country: Slovenia
- Traditional region: Littoral
- Statistical region: Coastal–Karst
- Municipality: Koper

Area
  - Total: 3.188 km^{2} (1.231 sq mi)

Population (2026)
  - Total: 275
  - Density: 86/km^{2} (220/sq mi)

Boršt (pronounced [ˈbɔːɾʃt]; Italian: Boste) is a settlement in the City Municipality of Koper in the Littoral region of Slovenia. In January 2026, the population was 275.

The local church is dedicated to Saint Roch.
