= Popetre =

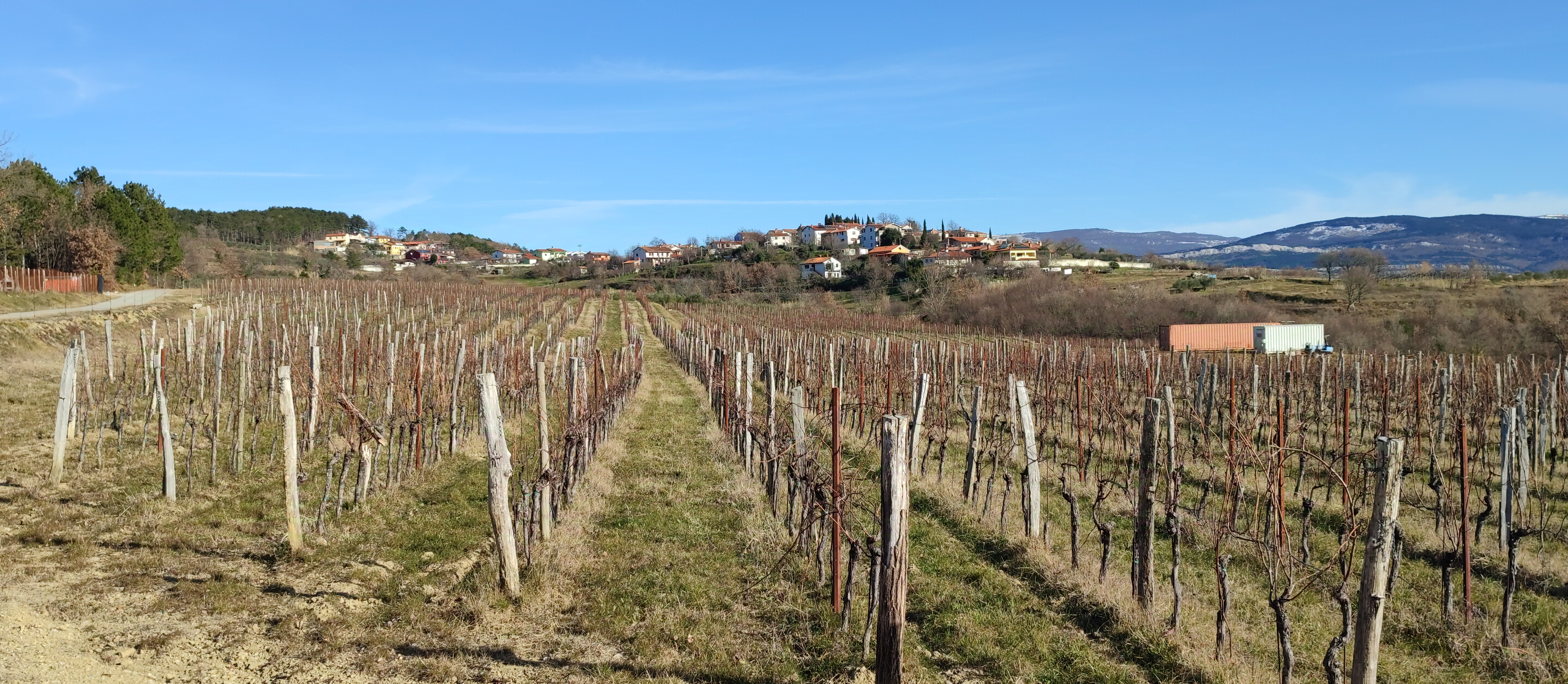
- Popetre in 2024

- Location in Slovenia
- Coordinates: 45°29′52.56″N 13°51′16.28″E
- Country: Slovenia
- Traditional region: Littoral
- Statistical region: Coastal–Karst
- Municipality: Koper

Area
  - Total: 2.31 km^{2} (0.89 sq mi)
- Elevation: 370.8 m (1,217 ft)

Population (2002)
  - Total: 95

Popetre (pronounced [pɔˈpeːtɾɛ]) is a village in the City Municipality of Koper in the Littoral region of Slovenia.

The local church is dedicated to Saint Andrew and belongs to the Parish of Truške.
