= Peraji =

Peraji Perai
- Location in Slovenia
- Coordinates: 45°27′25.07″N 13°52′44.88″E
- Country: Slovenia
- Traditional region: Littoral
- Statistical region: Coastal–Karst
- Municipality: Koper

Area
  - Total: 1.13 km^{2} (0.44 sq mi)
- Elevation: 298.3 m (979 ft)

Population (2002)
  - Total: no permanent residents

Peraji (pronounced [pɛˈɾaːji]; Italian: Perai) is a small settlement in the City Municipality of Koper in the Littoral region of Slovenia.

It lies close to the border with Croatia and is not connected by road to any surrounding settlements. It no longer has any permanent residents.
