= Dol pri Hrastovljah =

Dol pri Hrastovljah Villadolo
- Location in Slovenia
- Coordinates: 45°30′5.92″N 13°54′43.31″E
- Country: Slovenia
- Traditional region: Littoral
- Statistical region: Coastal–Karst
- Municipality: Koper

Area
  - Total: 3.36 km^{2} (1.30 sq mi)
- Elevation: 195.4 m (641 ft)

Population (2002)
  - Total: 104

Dol pri Hrastovljah (pronounced [ˈdoːu̯ pɾi xɾaˈstoːu̯ljax]; Italian: Villadolo) is a small village in the City Municipality of Koper in the Littoral region of Slovenia.

== Name ==
The name of the settlement was changed from Dol to Dol pri Hrastovljah in 1953.

== Church ==
The local church is dedicated to Saint John the Evangelist.
