= Bošamarin =

Bošamarin Bossamarin (Italian)
- Location in Slovenia
- Coordinates: 45°31′9.86″N 13°44′23.66″E
- Country: Slovenia
- Traditional region: Littoral
- Statistical region: Coastal–Karst
- Municipality: Koper

Area
  - Total: 1.591 km^{2} (0.614 sq mi)

Population (2026)
  - Total: 658
  - Density: 414/km^{2} (1,070/sq mi)

Bošamarin (pronounced [bɔʃamaˈɾiːn]; Italian: Bossamarin) is a settlement in the City Municipality of Koper in the Littoral region of Slovenia. In January 2026, the population was 658.
