= Sveti Anton, Koper =

Sveti Anton Sant'Antonio Pridvor (1958–1992)
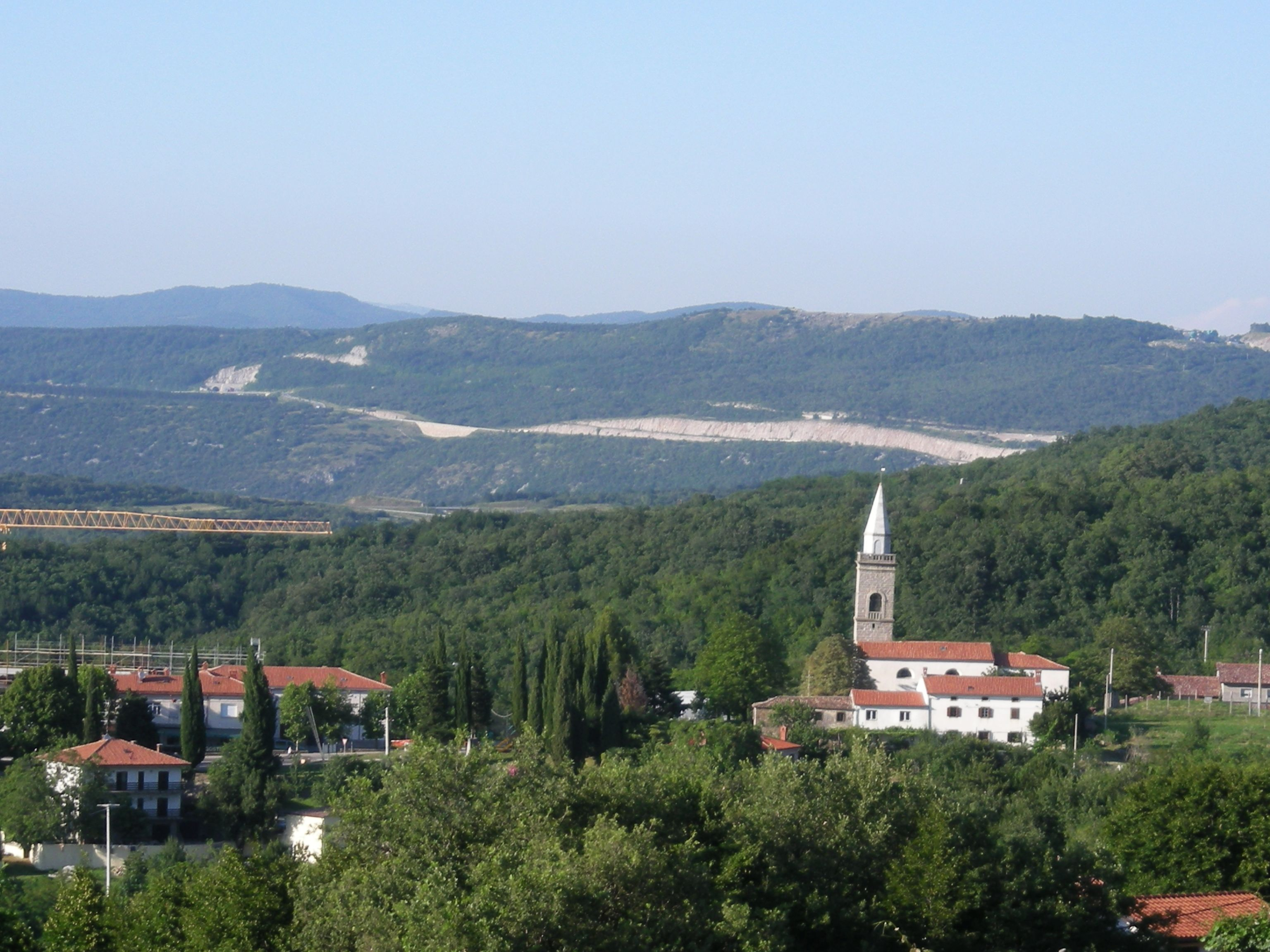

- Location in Slovenia
- Coordinates: 45°31′33.91″N 13°50′7.4″E
- Country: Slovenia
- Traditional region: Littoral
- Statistical region: Coastal–Karst
- Municipality: Koper

Area
  - Total: 7.06 km^{2} (2.73 sq mi)
- Elevation: 122.8 m (403 ft)

Population (2002)
  - Total: 1,343

Sveti Anton (pronounced [ˈsʋeːti anˈtoːn]; Italian: Sant'Antonio) is a settlement in the City Municipality of Koper in the Littoral region of Slovenia. It includes the hamlets of Boškarji, Bužarji, Cerej, Dolani, Dvori, Farančan, Fikoni, Gregoriči, Kavaliči, Kortina, Pečki, Škofarji, Sušteti, Tomažiči, Turki, and Vrtine.

== Name ==
The name of the settlement was changed from Sveti Anton (literally, 'Saint Anthony') to Pridvor in 1958. The name was changed on the basis of the 1948 Law on Names of Settlements and Designations of Squares, Streets, and Buildings as part of efforts by Slovenia's postwar communist government to remove religious elements from toponyms. The name Sveti Anton was restored in 1992.

== Church ==
The parish church in the settlement is dedicated to Saint Anthony and the settlement also gets its name from it.
