= Olika, Koper =

Olika
- Location in Slovenia
- Coordinates: 45°27′31.04″N 13°53′31.71″E
- Country: Slovenia
- Traditional region: Littoral
- Statistical region: Coastal–Karst
- Municipality: Koper

Area
  - Total: 0.26 km^{2} (0.10 sq mi)
- Elevation: 223.6 m (734 ft)

Population (2002)
  - Total: 5

Olika (pronounced [ˈoːlika]) is a small settlement in the City Municipality of Koper in the Littoral region of Slovenia close to the border with Croatia.
