= Trsek =

Trsek Tersecco
- Location in Slovenia
- Coordinates: 45°28′50.13″N 13°49′49.12″E
- Country: Slovenia
- Traditional region: Littoral
- Statistical region: Coastal–Karst
- Municipality: Koper

Area
  - Total: 2.57 km^{2} (0.99 sq mi)
- Elevation: 284.7 m (934 ft)

Population (2002)
  - Total: 54

Trsek (pronounced [ˈtəɾsək] or [təɾˈseːk]; Italian: Tersecco) is a small village in the City Municipality of Koper in the Littoral region of Slovenia.

The local church is dedicated to Saint Bridget and belongs to the Parish of Truške.
