= Bočaji =

Bočaji Bocciai, Bucciai
- Location in Slovenia
- Coordinates: 45°29′42.23″N 13°49′42.98″E
- Country: Slovenia
- Traditional region: Littoral
- Statistical region: Coastal–Karst
- Municipality: Koper

Area
  - Total: 17.985 km^{2} (6.944 sq mi)

Population (2026)
  - Total: 39
  - Density: 23/km^{2} (60/sq mi)

Bočaji (pronounced [bɔˈtʃaːji]; Italian: Bocciai, Bucciai) is a small settlement in the City Municipality of Koper in the Littoral region of Slovenia. In January 2026, the population was 39.
