= Brežec pri Podgorju =

Brežec pri Podgorju Brese di Piedimonte
- Location in Slovenia
- Coordinates: 45°30′45.03″N 13°55′7.9″E
- Country: Slovenia
- Traditional region: Littoral
- Statistical region: Coastal–Karst
- Municipality: Koper

Area
  - Total: 1.137 km^{2} (0.439 sq mi)

Population (2026)
  - Total: 1
  - Density: 1/km^{2} (2.6/sq mi)

Brežec pri Podgorju (pronounced [ˈbɾeːʒəts pɾi pɔdˈɡoːɾju]; Italian: Brese di Piedimonte) is a small settlement in the City Municipality of Koper in the Littoral region of Slovenia. As of January 2026, it had one permanent resident.

== The name ==
The official name of the village means 'Brežec near Podgorje', in order to distinguish it from other villages with the same name. The locals, however, usually refer to it simply as Brežec. The traditional Italian name of the village is Bressez, but it was renamed Brese di Piedimonte during the Fascist Italianization campaign in the 1920s because the old denomination was considered too Slavic-sounding.
