= Glem =

Glem Geme
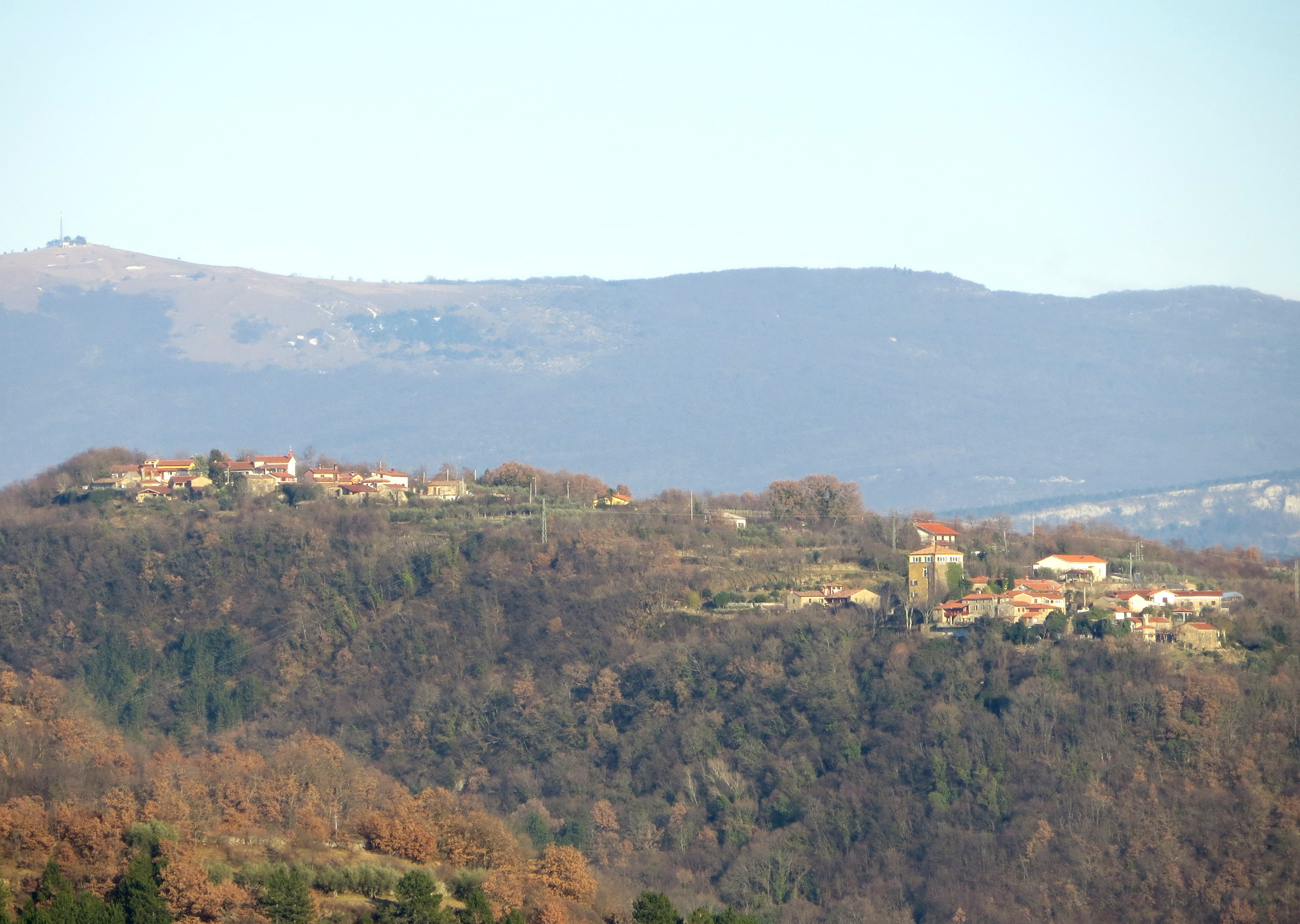

- Location in Slovenia
- Coordinates: 45°29′18.51″N 13°48′0.89″E
- Country: Slovenia
- Traditional region: Littoral
- Statistical region: Coastal–Karst
- Municipality: Koper

Area
  - Total: 1.77 km^{2} (0.68 sq mi)
- Elevation: 302 m (991 ft)

Population (2002)
  - Total: 44

Glem (pronounced [ˈɡleːm], Italian: Geme) is a settlement in the City Municipality of Koper in the Littoral region of Slovenia.

The local church is dedicated to the Assumption of Mary. Another church, built just outside the main settlement in the hamlet of Škrljevec, is dedicated to Saint Lazarus. Both belong to the Parish of Marezige.
