= Barizoni =

Barizoni Barisoni
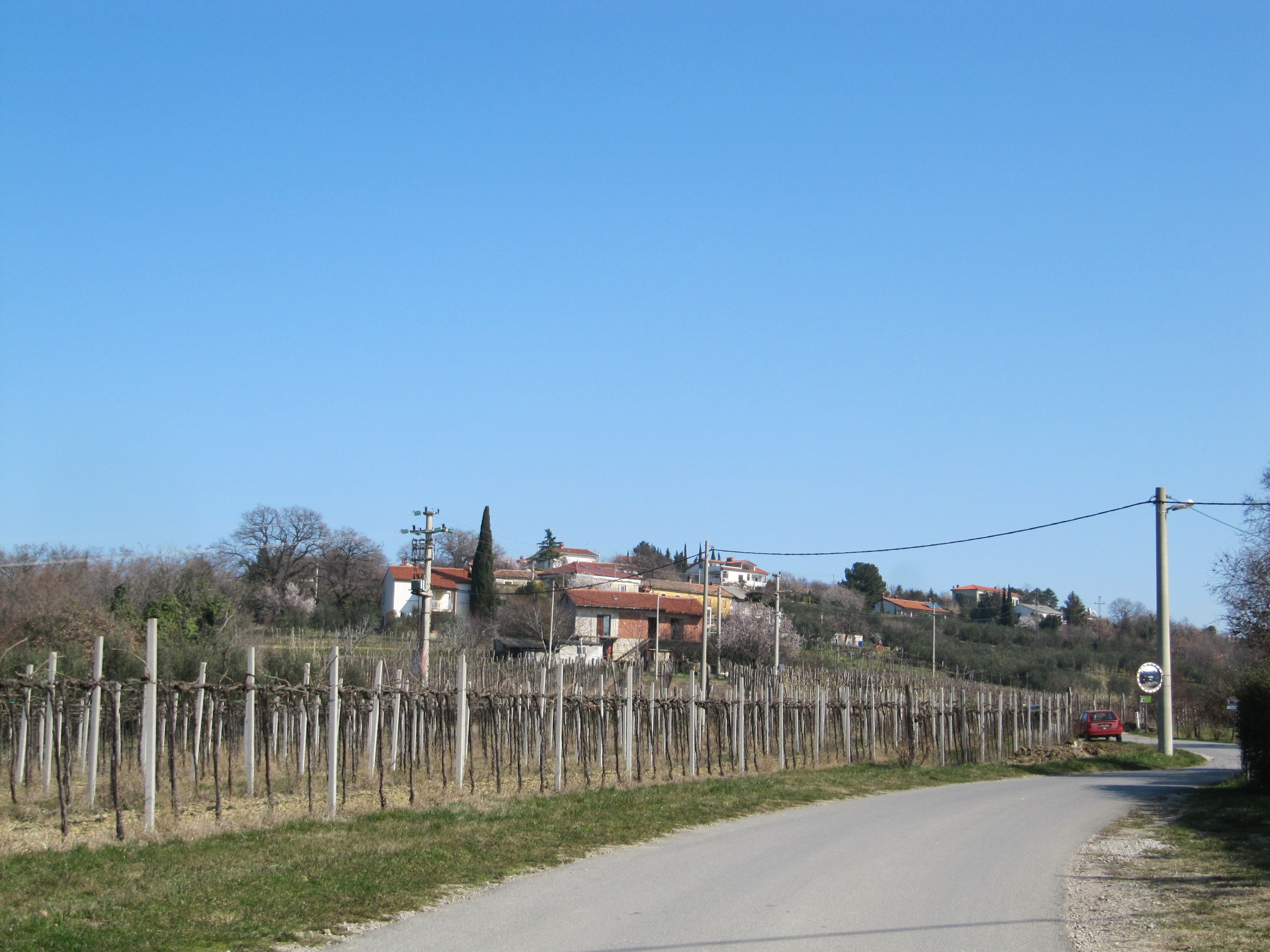

- Location in Slovenia
- Coordinates: 45°35′19.62″N 13°44′23.16″E
- Country: Slovenia
- Traditional region: Littoral
- Statistical region: Coastal–Karst
- Municipality: Koper

Area
  - Total: 0.928 km^{2} (0.358 sq mi)

Population (2026)
  - Total: 105
  - Density: 113/km^{2} (290/sq mi)

Barizoni (pronounced [baɾiˈzoːni]; Italian: Barissoni) is a small settlement in the City Municipality of Koper in the Littoral region of Slovenia. In January 2026, the population was 105.
