= Karli, Koper =

Karli Carli
- Location in Slovenia
- Coordinates: 45°26′59.94″N 13°53′59.94″E
- Country: Slovenia
- Traditional region: Littoral
- Statistical region: Coastal–Karst
- Municipality: Koper

Area
  - Total: 1.24 km^{2} (0.48 sq mi)
- Elevation: 160.2 m (526 ft)

Population (2002)
  - Total: no permanent residents

Karli (pronounced [ˈkaːɾli]; Italian: Carli) is a small settlement in the City Municipality of Koper in the Littoral region of Slovenia close to the border with Croatia. Its relative isolation has resulted in its population moving to larger settlements and there are no permanent residents left.
