= Triban =

Triban Tribano
- Location in Slovenia
- Coordinates: 45°31′22.55″N 13°45′27.9″E
- Country: Slovenia
- Traditional region: Littoral
- Statistical region: Coastal–Karst
- Municipality: Koper

Area
  - Total: 1.71 km^{2} (0.66 sq mi)
- Elevation: 34.6 m (114 ft)

Population (2002)
  - Total: 145

Triban (pronounced [tɾiˈbaːn]; Italian: Tribano) is a settlement in the City Municipality of Koper in the Littoral region of Slovenia.
