= Butari =

Butari Buttari
- Location in Slovenia
- Coordinates: 45°28′51.09″N 13°51′56.2″E
- Country: Slovenia
- Traditional region: Littoral
- Statistical region: Coastal–Karst
- Municipality: Koper

Area
  - Total: 2.032 km^{2} (0.785 sq mi)

Population (2026)
  - Total: 53
  - Density: 26/km^{2} (67/sq mi)

Butari (pronounced [ˈbuːtaɾi]; Italian: Buttari) is a small settlement close to the source of the Dragonja River in the City Municipality of Koper in the Littoral region of Slovenia. As of January 2026, the population was 26.
