= Topolovec, Koper =

Topolovec Tòppolo in Belvedere
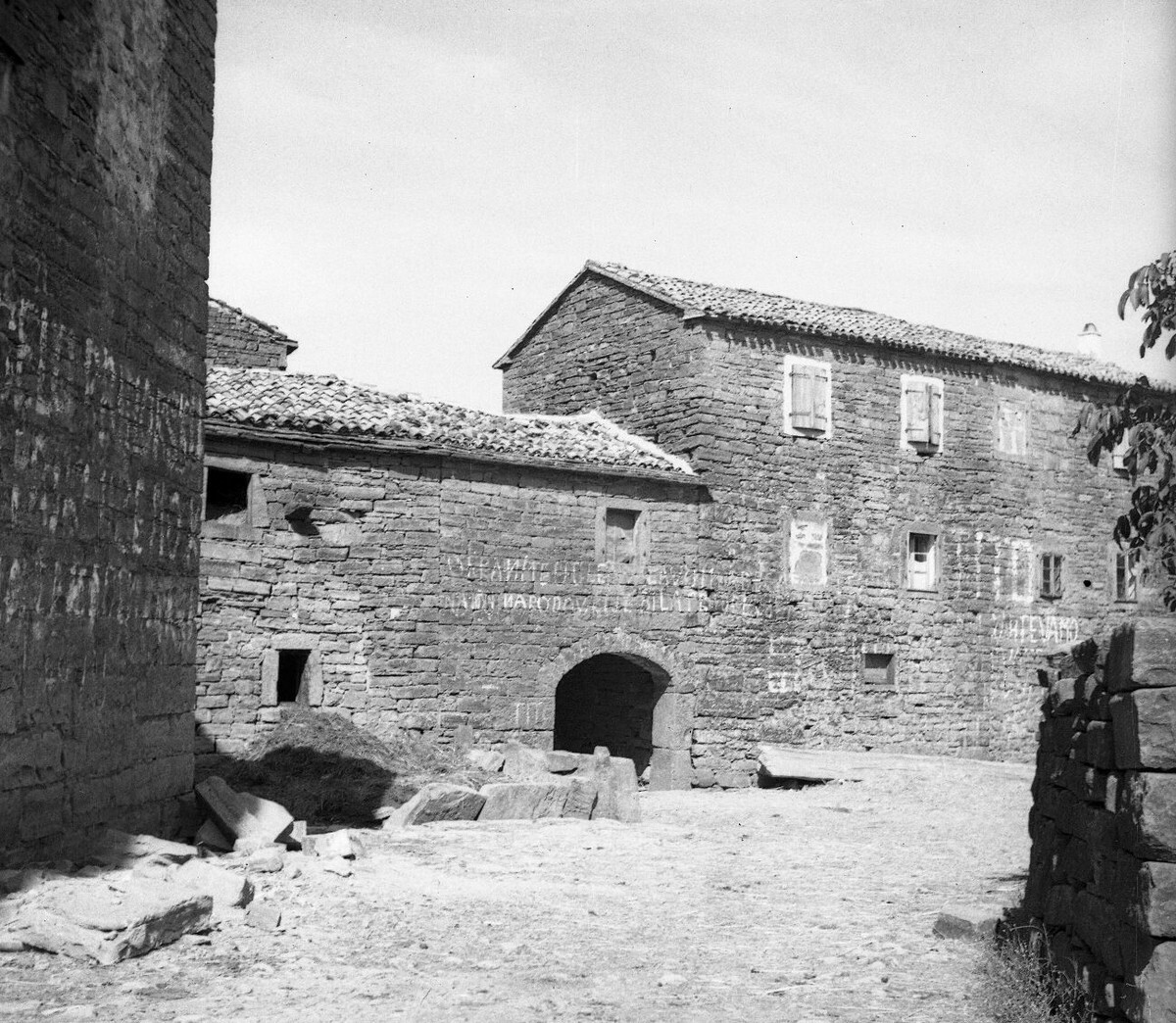
- Houses in Topolovec (1950)

- Location in Slovenia
- Coordinates: 45°27′50.4″N 13°48′34.4″E
- Country: Slovenia
- Traditional region: Littoral
- Statistical region: Coastal–Karst
- Municipality: Koper

Area
  - Total: 4.84 km^{2} (1.87 sq mi)
- Elevation: 408.4 m (1,340 ft)

Population (2002)
  - Total: 44

Topolovec (pronounced [tɔpɔˈlɔːʋəts] or [tɔpɔˈloːʋəts]; Italian: Tòppolo in Belvedere) is a settlement in the City Municipality of Koper in the Littoral region of Slovenia on the border with Croatia.

== Overview ==
It is made up of three hamlets: Topolovec, Hrvoji, and Žrnjovec. The parish church in Hrvoji is dedicated to Saint Zeno. Another church on a hill above Topolovec is dedicated to Saint Jerome.
