= Gažon =

Gažon Gasòn
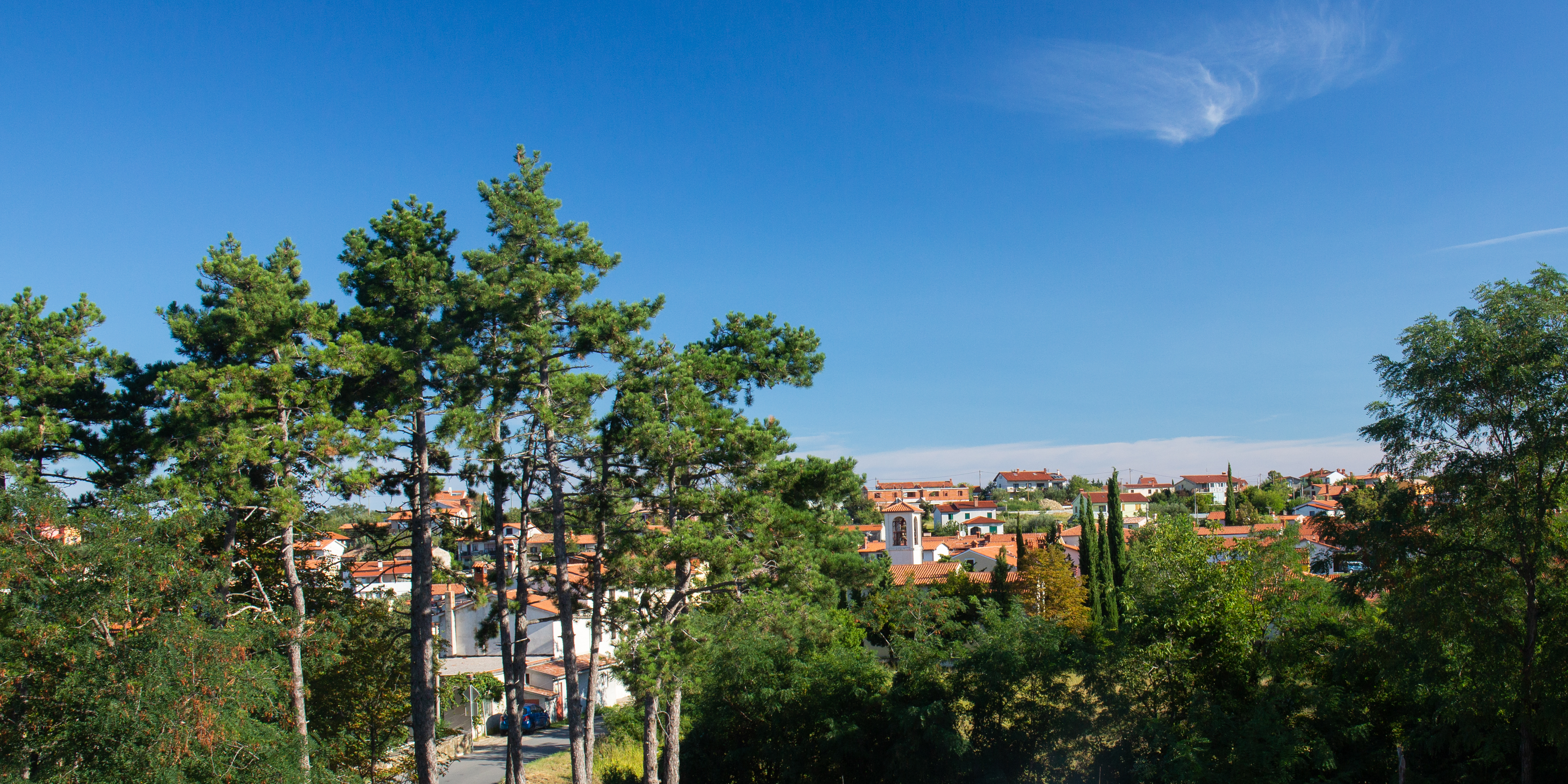

- Location in Slovenia
- Coordinates: 45°30′57.24″N 13°41′57.46″E
- Country: Slovenia
- Traditional region: Littoral
- Statistical region: Coastal–Karst
- Municipality: Koper

Area
  - Total: 1.86 km^{2} (0.72 sq mi)
- Elevation: 240.7 m (790 ft)

Population (2002)
  - Total: 467

Gažon (pronounced [ɡaˈʒoːn]; Italian: Gasòn) is a village in the City Municipality of Koper in the Littoral region of Slovenia.

The local church is dedicated to the Feast of Saints Peter and Paul and belongs to the Parish of Šmarje.
