= Manžan =

Village in southwest Slovenia

Manžan Manzano
- Village
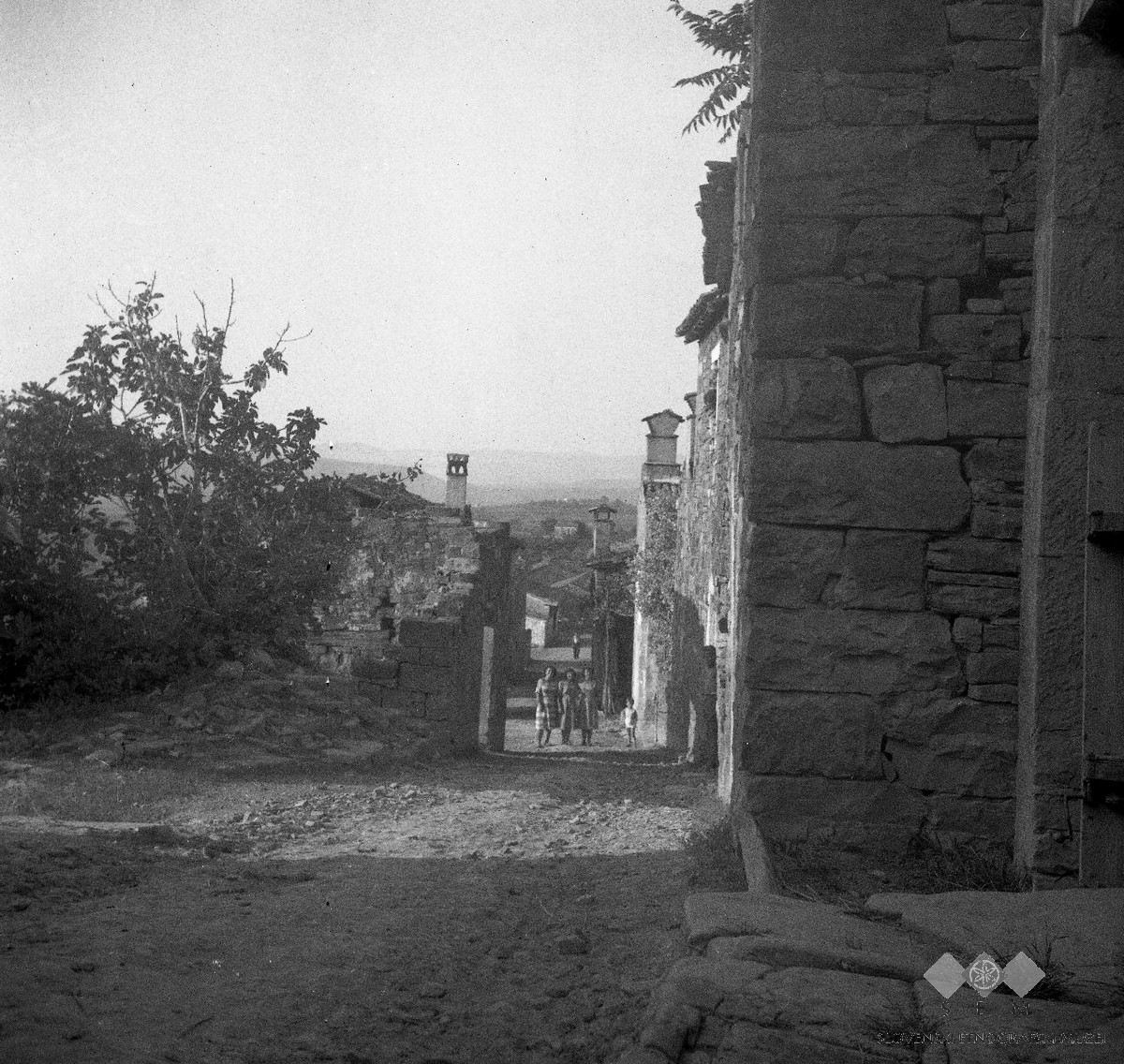
- Manžan in 1950

- Location in Slovenia
- Coordinates: 45°30′32.14″N 13°45′10.12″E
- Country: Slovenia
- Traditional region: Littoral
- Statistical region: Coastal–Karst
- Municipality: Koper

Area
  - Total: 1.16 km^{2} (0.45 sq mi)
- Elevation: 136.8 m (449 ft)
- 407

Manžan (pronounced [manˈʒaːn]; Italian: Manzano) is a settlement in the City Municipality of Koper in the Littoral region of Slovenia.
