= Brič, Slovenia =

Brič
- Interactive map of Brič
- Location in Slovenia
- Coordinates: 45°27′43.54″N 13°43′57.41″E
- Country: Slovenia
- Traditional region: Littoral
- Statistical region: Coastal–Karst
- Municipality: Koper

Area
  - Total: 2.711 km^{2} (1.047 sq mi)
- Elevation: 167.4 m (549 ft)

Population (2026)
  - Total: no permanent residents

Brič (pronounced [ˈbɾiːtʃ]) is a small settlement in the City Municipality of Koper in the Littoral region of Slovenia. It lies on the left bank of the Dragonja River and no longer has any permanent residents.
