= Čežarji =

Čežarji Cesari
- Location in Slovenia
- Coordinates: 45°32′14.6″N 13°48′20.54″E
- Country: Slovenia
- Traditional region: Littoral
- Statistical region: Coastal–Karst
- Municipality: Koper

Area
  - Total: 1.230 km^{2} (0.475 sq mi)
- Elevation: 122.5 m (402 ft)

Population (2026)
  - Total: 630
  - Density: 512/km^{2} (1,330/sq mi)

Čežarji (pronounced [ˈtʃeːʒaɾji]; Italian: Cesari [tʃeˈzaːri]) is a settlement south of Dekani in the City Municipality of Koper in the Littoral region of Slovenia. The settlement includes the hamlets of Šimiči and Žnidarji. As of January 2026, the population was 630.

== Name ==
The name Čežarji is believed to be of Italian origin, derived from Cesari, the surname of a landowner that operated tenant farms in the area.

== History ==
Čežarji was burned twice during the Second World War. The village burned on 15 May 1941, and a large number of houses were burned by German forces on 2 October 1943.
