= Krnica, Koper =

Krnica Carnizza
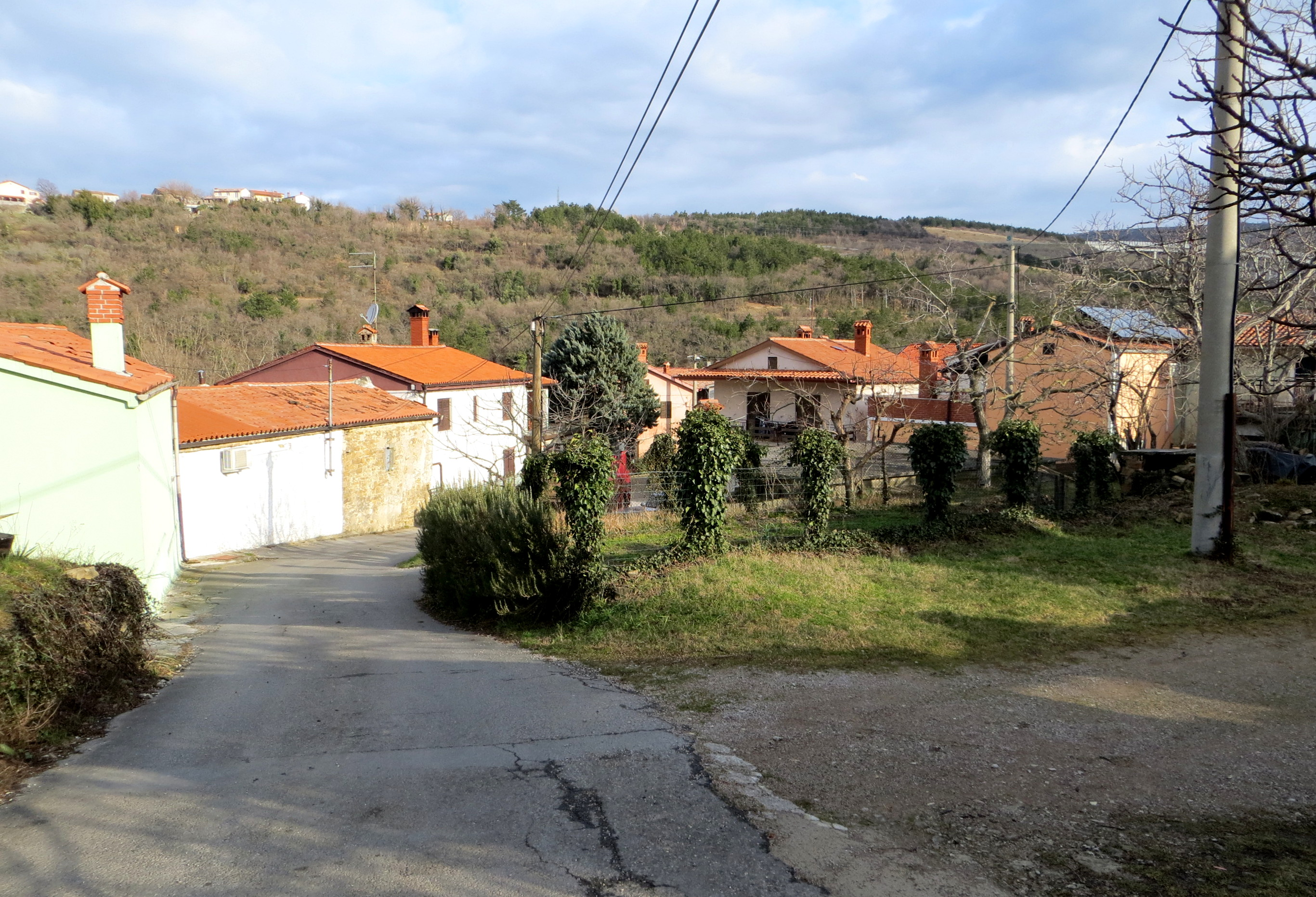

- Location in Slovenia
- Coordinates: 45°32′45.66″N 13°51′26.6″E
- Country: Slovenia
- Traditional region: Littoral
- Statistical region: Coastal–Karst
- Municipality: Koper

Area
  - Total: 0.57 km^{2} (0.22 sq mi)
- Elevation: 109.7 m (360 ft)

Population (2002)
  - Total: 54

Krnica (pronounced [kəɾˈniːtsa]; Italian: Carnizza) is a small settlement next to Rižana in the City Municipality of Koper in the Littoral region of Slovenia.
