= Bezovica, Koper =

Bezovica Besovizza
- Location in Slovenia
- Coordinates: 45°31′51.87″N 13°53′37.2″E
- Country: Slovenia
- Traditional region: Littoral
- Statistical region: Coastal–Karst
- Municipality: Koper

Area
  - Total: 2.173 km^{2} (0.839 sq mi)

Population (2026)
  - Total: 69
  - Density: 32/km^{2} (83/sq mi)

Bezovica (pronounced [bəzɔˈʋiːtsa]; Italian: Besovizza) is a settlement in the City Municipality of Koper in the Littoral region of Slovenia, in the southwest of the country. In January 2026, the population was 69.

== History ==
The Placitum of Rižana (Slovene: rižanski zbor, Italian: placito del Risano) is believed to have taken place on Zvroček Hill in AD 804 in the western part of the settlement; the agreement settled relations between the newly arrived Slavs and the older population in the region. A water main was installed in Bezovica in 1935. During the Second World War, Bezovica was burned by German forces on October 2, 1943. After the war, beavers were raised for some time on a farm in the village.

=== Mass grave ===
Bezovica is the site of a mass grave associated with the Second World War. The Bremce Mass Grave (Slovene: Grobišče Bremce) is located about 1 km northeast of the settlement. Spelunkers found human remains at the site; the remains that were scattered across the floor of the cave were collected in 1992 and were reburied in the Koper cemetery in 2004.

== Church ==
The local church is dedicated to Saint Apollonia.
