= Dilici =

Dilici Dilizze
- Location in Slovenia
- Coordinates: 45°29′29.29″N 13°46′9.54″E
- Country: Slovenia
- Traditional region: Littoral
- Statistical region: Coastal–Karst
- Municipality: Koper

Area
  - Total: 1.38 km^{2} (0.53 sq mi)
- Elevation: 307.1 m (1,008 ft)

Population (2002)
  - Total: 4

Dilici (pronounced [ˈdiːlitsi]; Italian: Dilizze) is a small settlement east of Koštabona in the City Municipality of Koper in the Littoral region of Slovenia.
