= Lukini =

Lukini Luchini
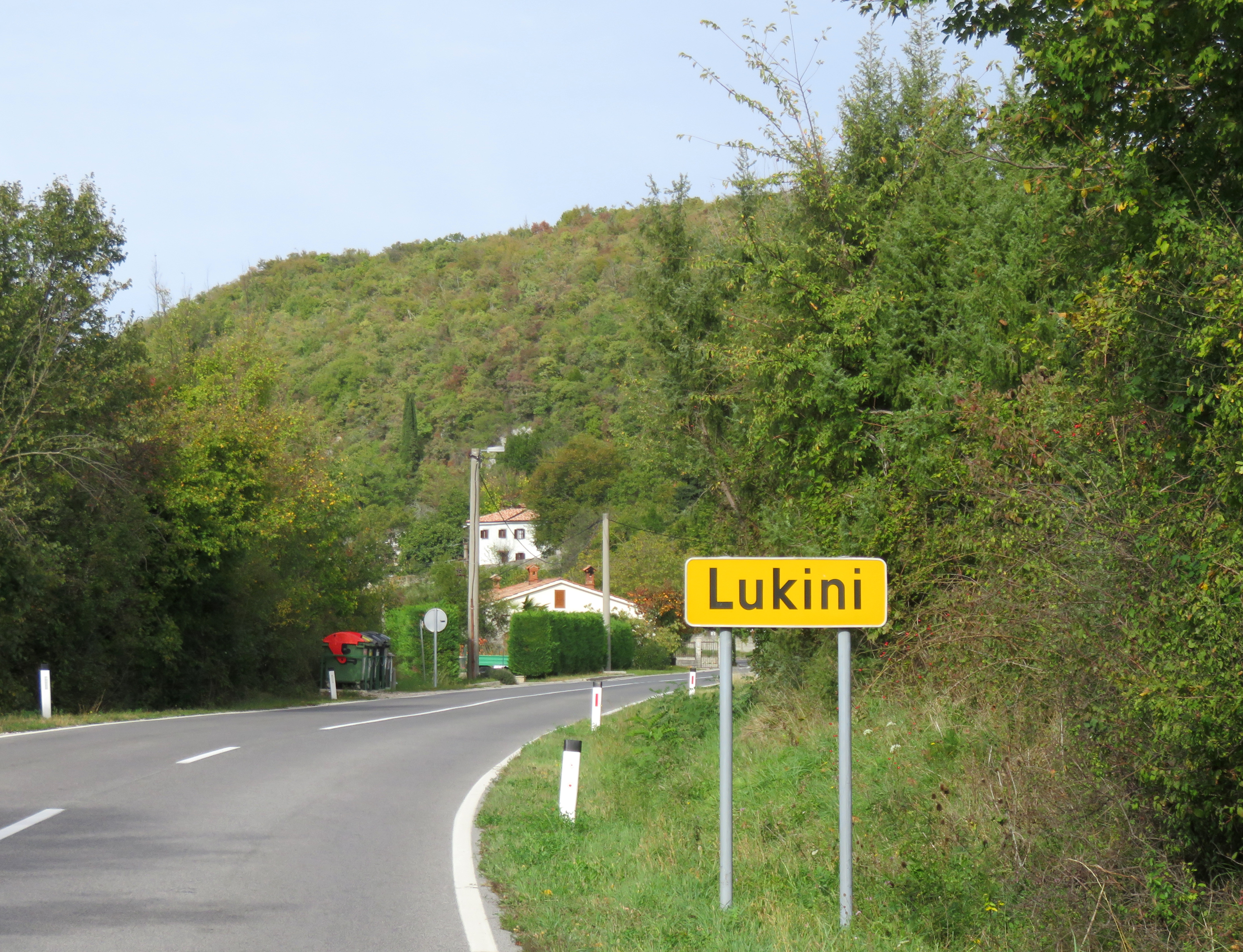

- Location in Slovenia
- Coordinates: 45°28′22″N 13°53′42.22″E
- Country: Slovenia
- Traditional region: Littoral
- Statistical region: Coastal–Karst
- Municipality: Koper

Area
  - Total: 5.08 km^{2} (1.96 sq mi)
- Elevation: 321.4 m (1,054 ft)

Population (2002)
  - Total: 47

Lukini (pronounced [luˈkiːni]; Italian: Luchini) is a small settlement in the City Municipality of Koper in the Littoral region of Slovenia close to the Croatian border.
