= Bonini =

- Location in Slovenia
- Coordinates: 45°31′44.88″N 13°47′20.51″E
- Country: Slovenia
- Traditional region: Littoral
- Statistical region: Coastal–Karst
- Municipality: Koper

Area
  - Total: 3.228 km^{2} (1.246 sq mi)

Population (2026)
  - Total: 656
  - Density: 203/km^{2} (530/sq mi)

Bonini (pronounced [bɔˈniːni]) is a settlement in the City Municipality of Koper in the Littoral region of Slovenia. In January 2026, the population was 656.
