= Krkavče =

Krkavče Carcase, Carcauzze
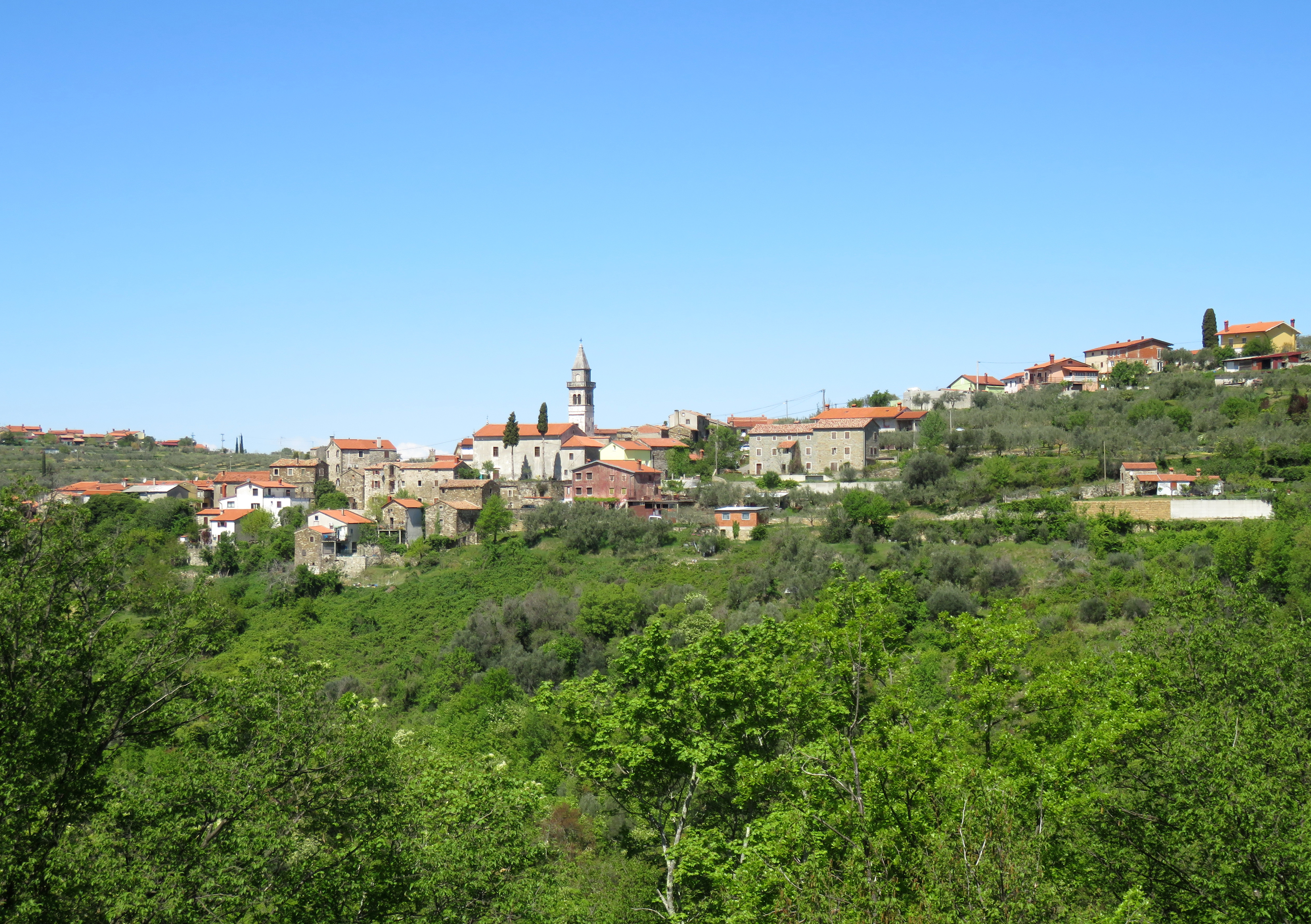

- Location in Slovenia
- Coordinates: 45°27′50.35″N 13°41′34.09″E
- Country: Slovenia
- Traditional region: Littoral
- Statistical region: Coastal–Karst
- Municipality: Koper

Area
  - Total: 6.45 km^{2} (2.49 sq mi)
- Elevation: 185.3 m (608 ft)

Population (2002)
  - Total: 254

Krkavče (pronounced [ˈkəɾkau̯tʃɛ]; Italian: Carcauzze or Carcase) is a village in the City Municipality of Koper in the Littoral region of Slovenia close to the border with Croatia. It includes the hamlets of Abrabi, Draga, Girič, Glavini, Hrib, Mačkujek, Pršuti, Rov, Škrljevec, Solni, Sveti Maver, and Žvabi.

== Church ==
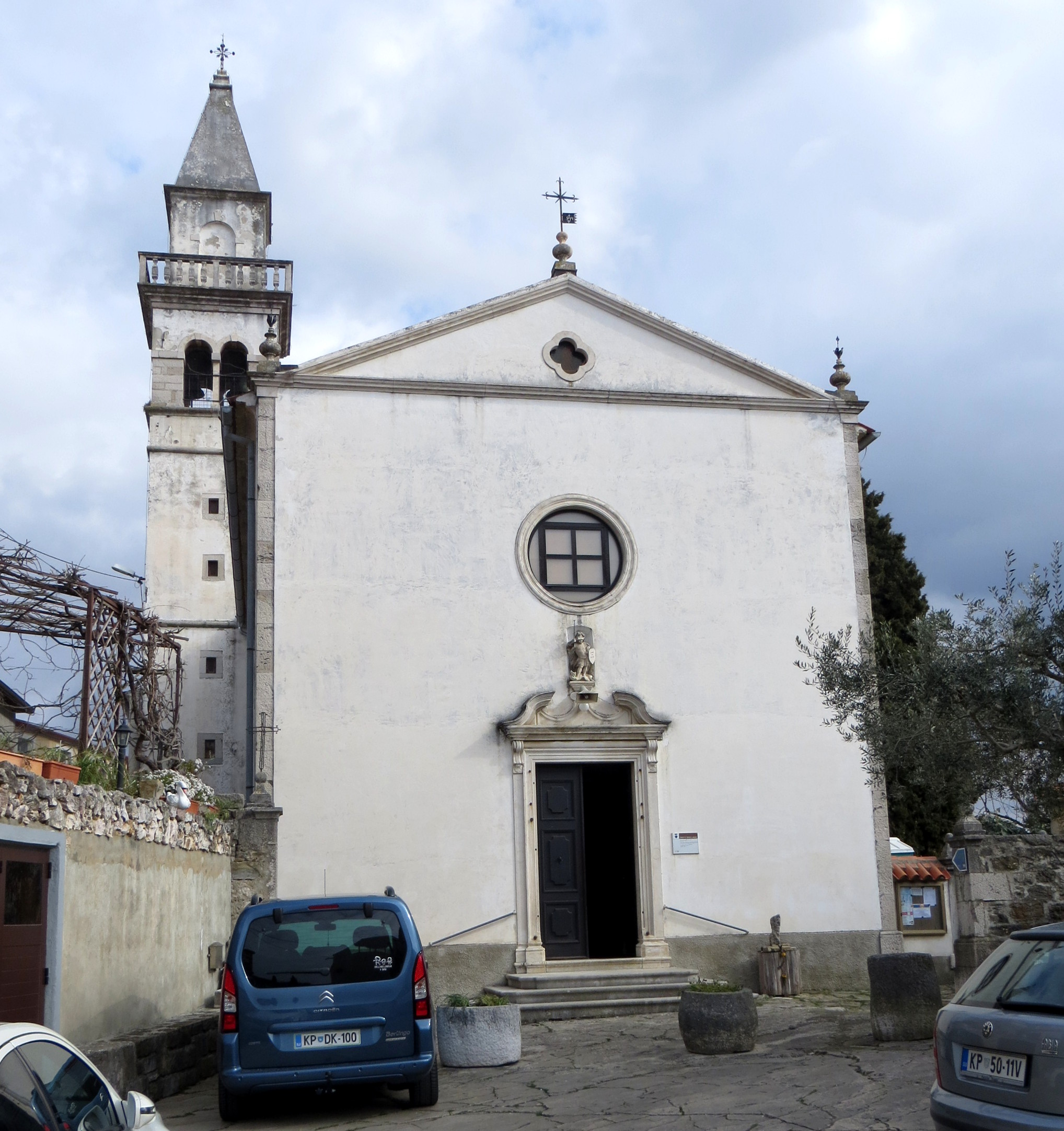
West facade

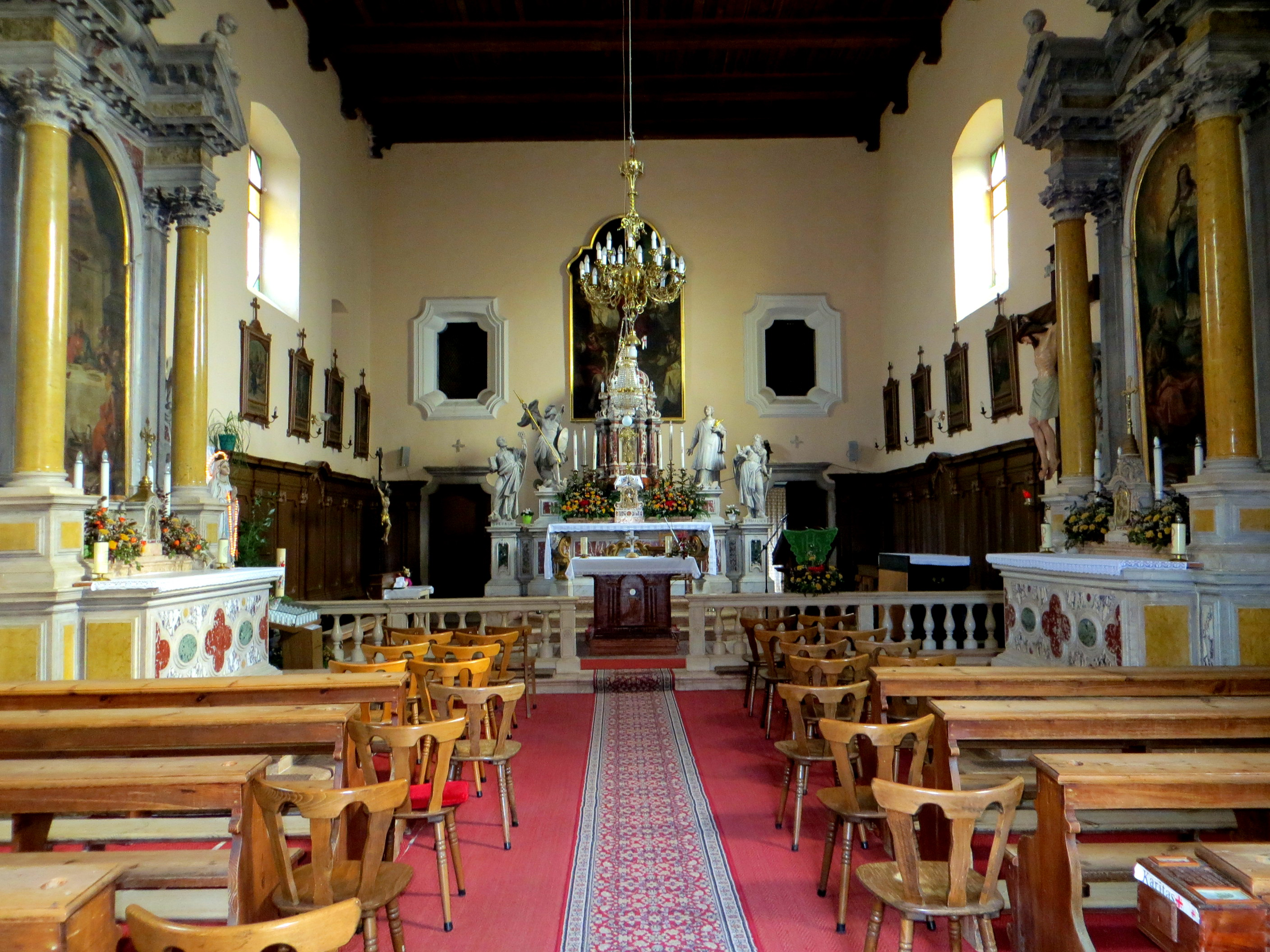
Church interior

Archangel Michael's Church

The parish church in the settlement is dedicated to Saint Michael. It was built on the bare stone village square in 1749.

== See also ==
- Slovenian Istria
