= Urban Municipality of Koper =

Urban municipality of Slovenia

Urban Municipality of Koper Mestna občina Koper Comune città di Capodistria
- Municipality
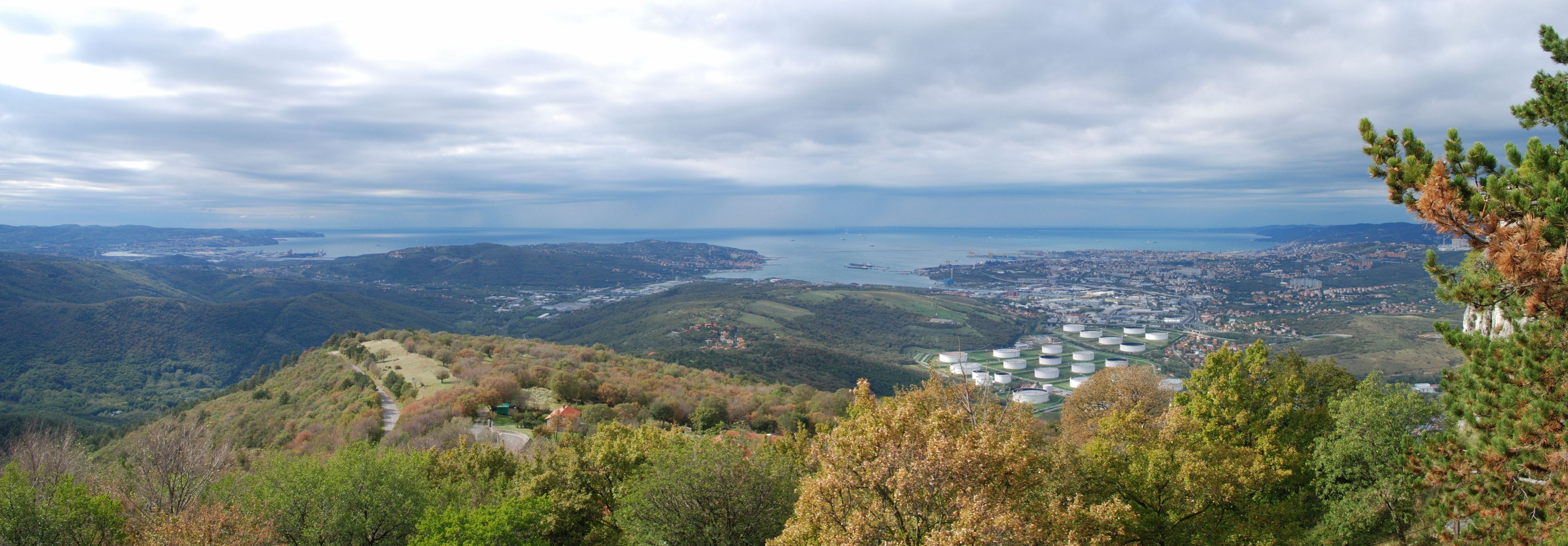

- Coat of arms

- Location of the Urban Municipality of Koper in Slovenia
- Coordinates: 45°33′N 13°44′E
- Country: Slovenia

Government
  - Mayor: Aleš Bržan (Aleš Bržan List)

Area
  - Total: 304 km^{2} (117 sq mi)

Population (2021)
  - Total: 53,440
  - Density: 176/km^{2} (455/sq mi)
- Time zone: UTC+01 (CET)
  - Summer (DST): UTC+02 (CEST)
- Website: www.koper.si

The Urban Municipality of Koper (pronounced [ˈkoːpəɾ]; Slovene: Mestna občina Koper, Italian: Comune città di Capodistria) is one of twelve urban municipalities of Slovenia. It is located at the coastline of the Adriatic Sea in southwestern Slovenia and was established in 1994. The seat of the municipality is the town of Koper. Since 1995, the area has been part of the Coastal–Karst Statistical Region. The municipality is bilingual, with both Slovene and Italian recognized, and it shares borders with Italy and Croatia.

== Settlements ==
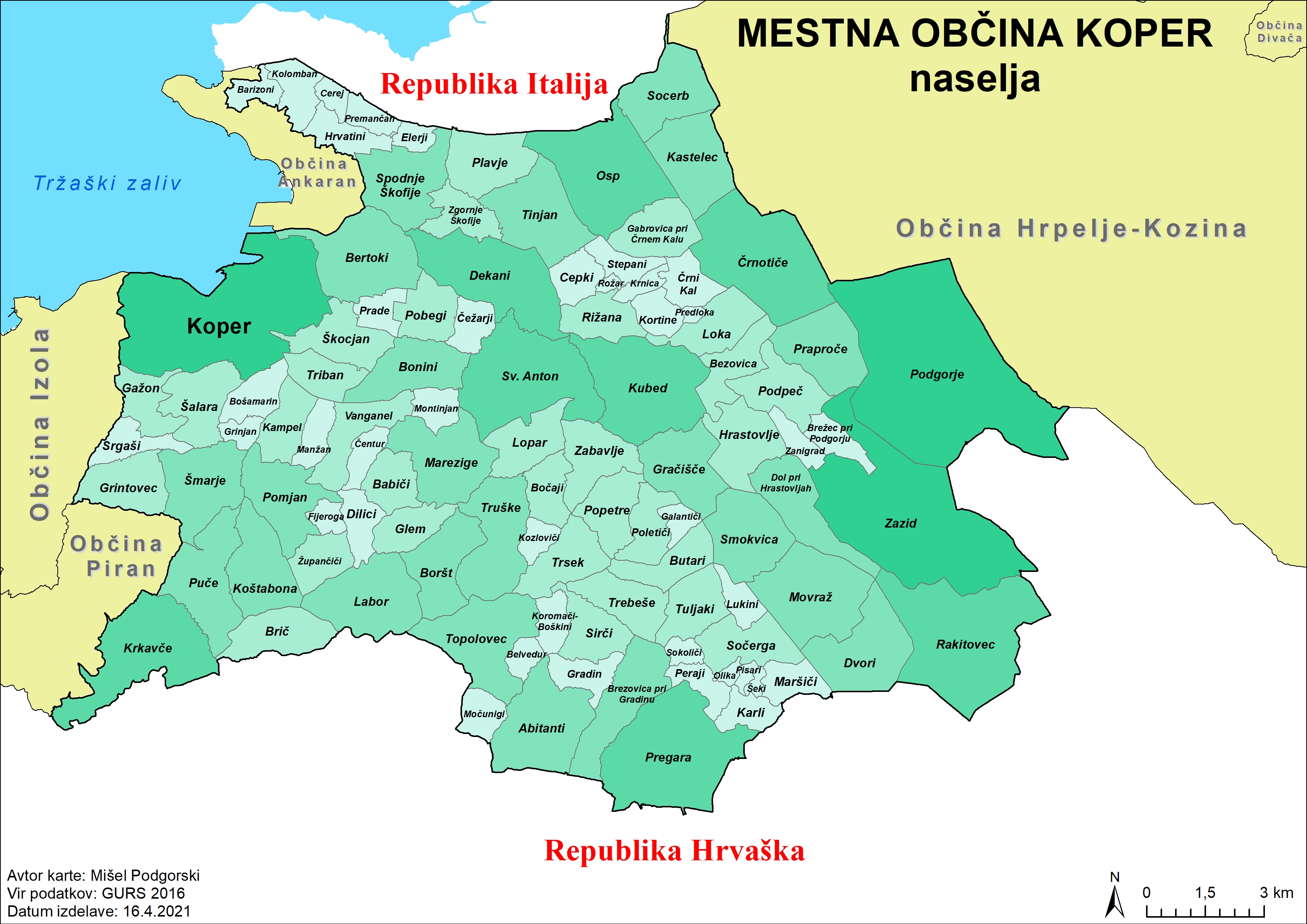
Villages in the municipality

In addition to the municipal seat of Koper, the municipality also includes the following settlements:

- Abitanti
- Babiči
- Barizoni
- Belvedur
- Bertoki
- Bezovica
- Bočaji
- Bonini
- Boršt
- Bošamarin
- Brezovica pri Gradinu
- Brežec pri Podgorju
- Brič
- Butari
- Čentur
- Cepki
- Cerej
- Čežarji
- Črni Kal
- Črnotiče
- Dekani
- Dilici
- Dol pri Hrastovljah
- Dvori
- Elerji
- Fijeroga
- Gabrovica pri Črnem Kalu
- Galantiči
- Gažon
- Glem
- Gračišče
- Gradin
- Grinjan
- Grintovec
- Hrastovlje
- Hrvatini
- Kampel
- Karli
- Kastelec
- Kolomban
- Koromači–Boškini
- Kortine
- Kozloviči
- Koštabona
- Krkavče
- Krnica
- Kubed
- Labor
- Loka
- Lopar
- Lukini
- Manžan
- Marezige
- Maršiči
- Močunigi
- Montinjan
- Movraž
- Olika
- Osp
- Peraji
- Pisari
- Plavje
- Pobegi
- Podgorje
- Podpeč
- Poletiči
- Pomjan
- Popetre
- Prade
- Praproče
- Predloka
- Pregara
- Premančan
- Puče
- Rakitovec
- Rižana
- Rožar
- Šalara
- Šeki
- Sirči
- Škocjan
- Šmarje
- Smokvica
- Socerb
- Sočerga
- Sokoliči
- Spodnje Škofije
- Srgaši
- Stepani
- Sveti Anton
- Tinjan
- Topolovec
- Trebeše
- Triban
- Trsek
- Truške
- Tuljaki
- Vanganel
- Zabavlje
- Zanigrad
- Zazid
- Zgornje Škofije
- Župančiči
