= Tuljaki =

Village in Littoral region, Slovenia

Tuljaki Tuliachi
- Location in Slovenia
- Coordinates: 45°28′8.65″N 13°52′28.82″E
- Country: Slovenia
- Traditional region: Littoral
- Statistical region: Coastal–Karst
- Municipality: Koper

Area
  - Total: 2.31 km^{2} (0.89 sq mi)
- Elevation: 339.1 m (1,113 ft)
- 13

Tuljaki (pronounced [tuˈljaːki]; Italian: Tuliachi) is a small settlement in the City Municipality of Koper in the Littoral region of Slovenia.
