= Zabavlje =

Zabavlje Zabavia
- Location in Slovenia
- Coordinates: 45°30′5.04″N 13°50′28.57″E
- Country: Slovenia
- Traditional region: Littoral
- Statistical region: Coastal–Karst
- Municipality: Koper

Area
  - Total: 2.72 km^{2} (1.05 sq mi)
- Elevation: 359.9 m (1,181 ft)

Population (2002)
  - Total: 22

Zabavlje (pronounced [zaˈbaːu̯ljɛ]; Italian: Zabavia) is a small settlement in the City Municipality of Koper in the Littoral region of Slovenia.
