= Cepki =

Cepki Villa Manzini
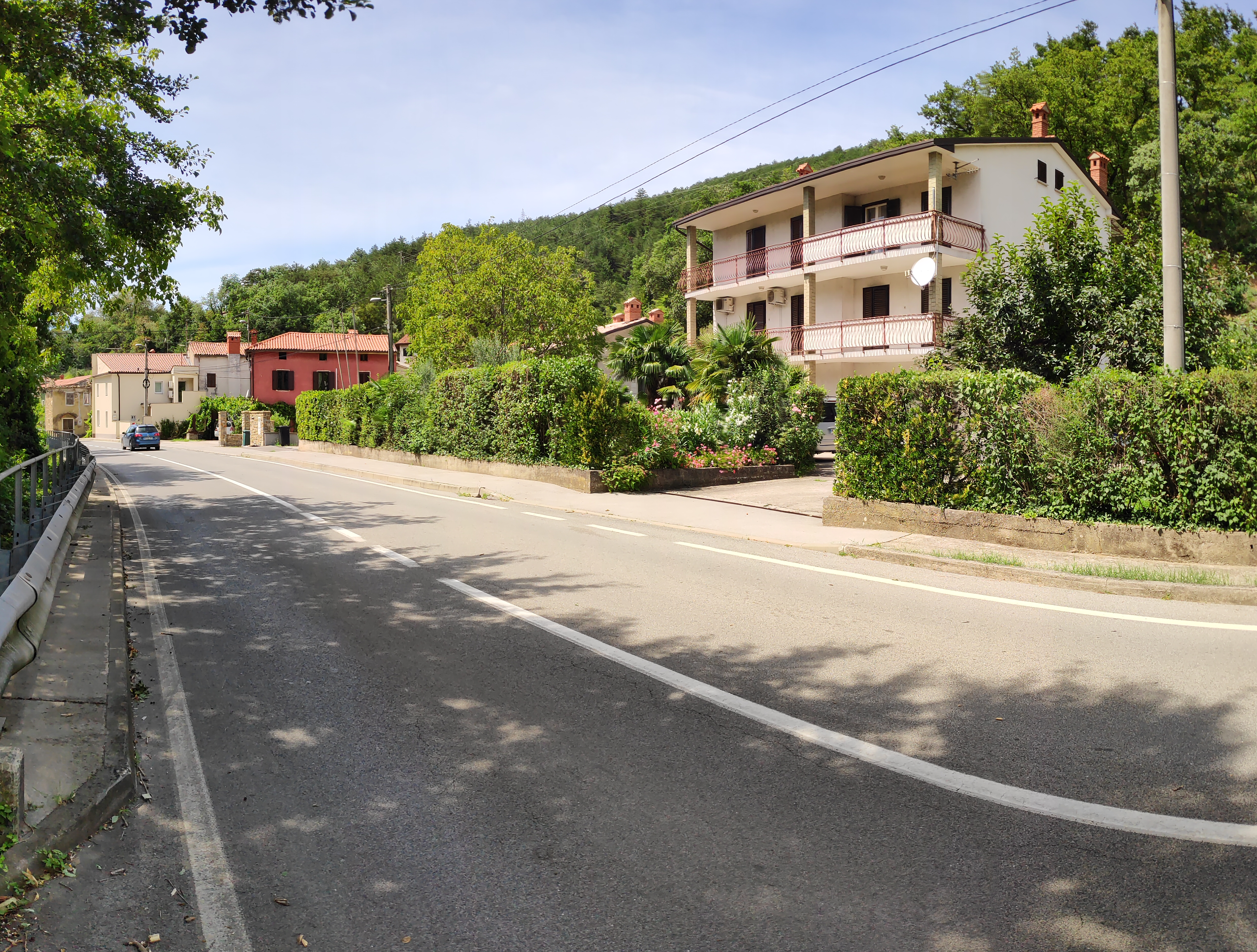

- Location in Slovenia
- Coordinates: 45°32′41.61″N 13°50′38.27″E
- Country: Slovenia
- Traditional region: Littoral
- Statistical region: Coastal–Karst
- Municipality: Koper

Area
  - Total: 1.372 km^{2} (0.530 sq mi)
- Elevation: 51.9 m (170 ft)

Population (2026)
  - Total: 97
  - Density: 71/km^{2} (180/sq mi)

Cepki (pronounced [ˈtseːpki]; Italian: Villa Manzini) is a small settlement between Dekani and Rižana in the City Municipality of Koper in the Littoral region of Slovenia. As of January 2026, the population was 97.
