= Kolomban =

Kolomban Colombano
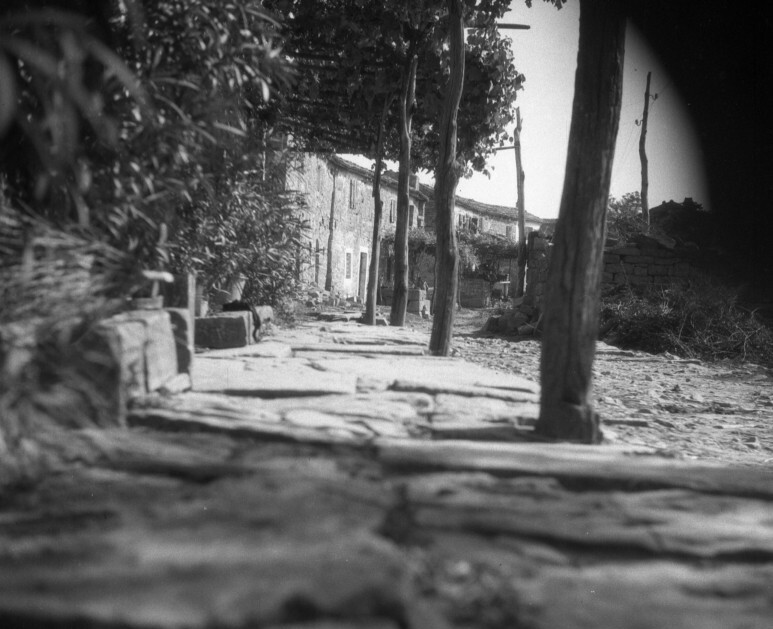

- Location in Slovenia
- Coordinates: 45°35′37.62″N 13°44′40.29″E
- Country: Slovenia
- Traditional region: Littoral
- Statistical region: Coastal–Karst
- Municipality: Koper

Area
  - Total: 1.6 km^{2} (0.62 sq mi)
- Elevation: 132.4 m (434 ft)

Population (2002)
  - Total: 480

Kolomban (pronounced [kɔlɔmˈbaːn]; Italian: Colombano) is a settlement in the City Municipality of Koper in the Littoral region of Slovenia on the border with Italy.

The local church is dedicated to Saint Bride and belongs to the Parish of Ankaran.
