= Maršiči, Koper =

Maršiči Marsici
- Location in Slovenia
- Coordinates: 45°27′14.03″N 13°54′22.67″E
- Country: Slovenia
- Traditional region: Littoral
- Statistical region: Coastal–Karst
- Municipality: Koper

Area
  - Total: 1.4 km^{2} (0.54 sq mi)
- Elevation: 128.4 m (421 ft)

Population (2002)
  - Total: 11

Maršiči (pronounced [ˈmaːɾʃitʃi]; Italian: Marsici) is a small settlement in the City Municipality of Koper in the Littoral region of Slovenia on the border with Croatia.
