= Kortine =

Kortine Sali sul Risano
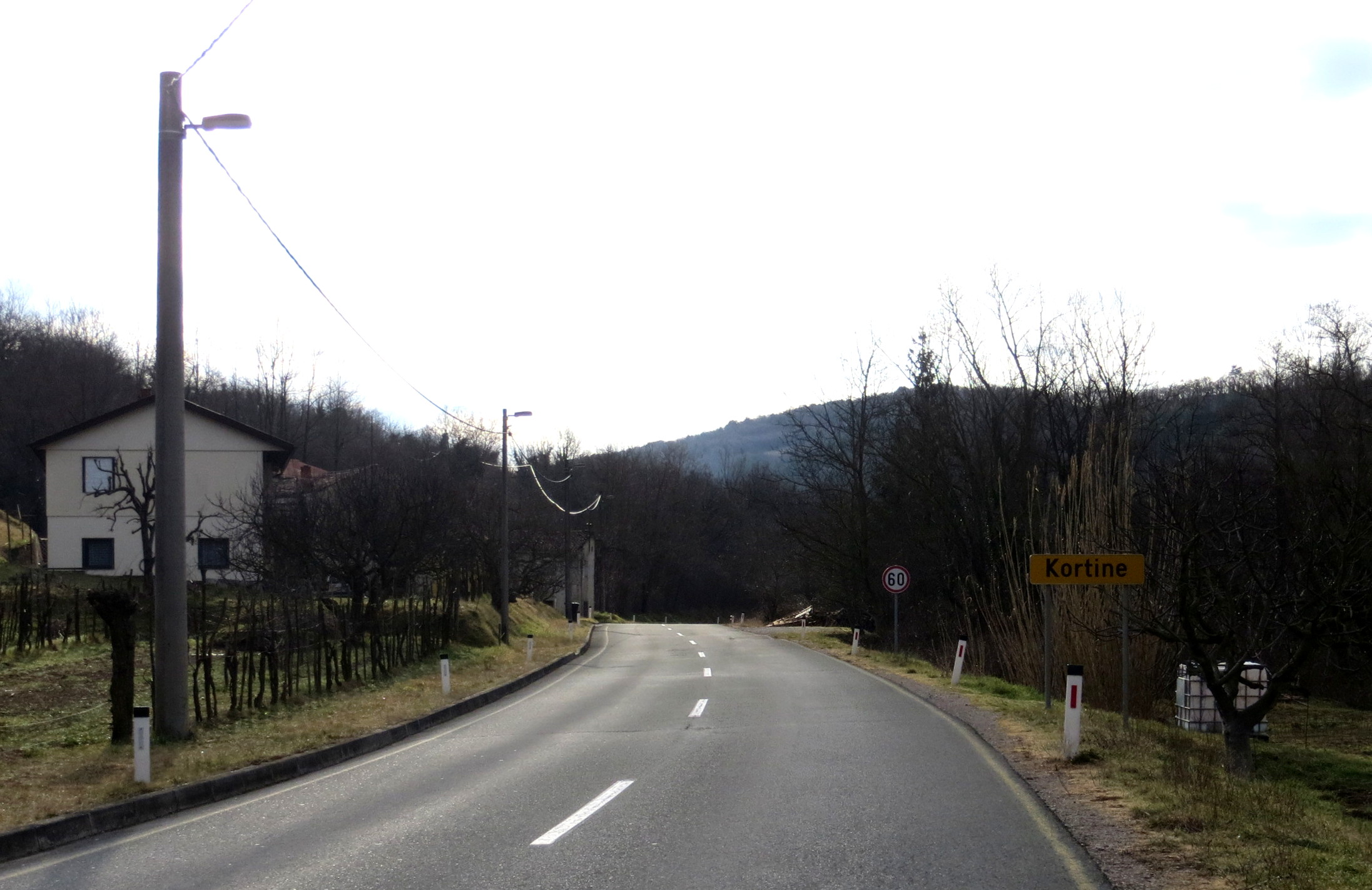

- Location in Slovenia
- Coordinates: 45°32′36.63″N 13°52′4.12″E
- Country: Slovenia
- Traditional region: Littoral
- Statistical region: Coastal–Karst
- Municipality: Koper

Area
  - Total: 1.14 km^{2} (0.44 sq mi)
- Elevation: 128.3 m (421 ft)

Population (2002)
  - Total: 84

Kortine (pronounced [kɔɾˈtiːnɛ]; Italian: Sali sul Risano) is a small dispersed settlement near Rižana in the City Municipality of Koper in the Littoral region of Slovenia.
