= Pobegi =

Pobegi Pobeghi
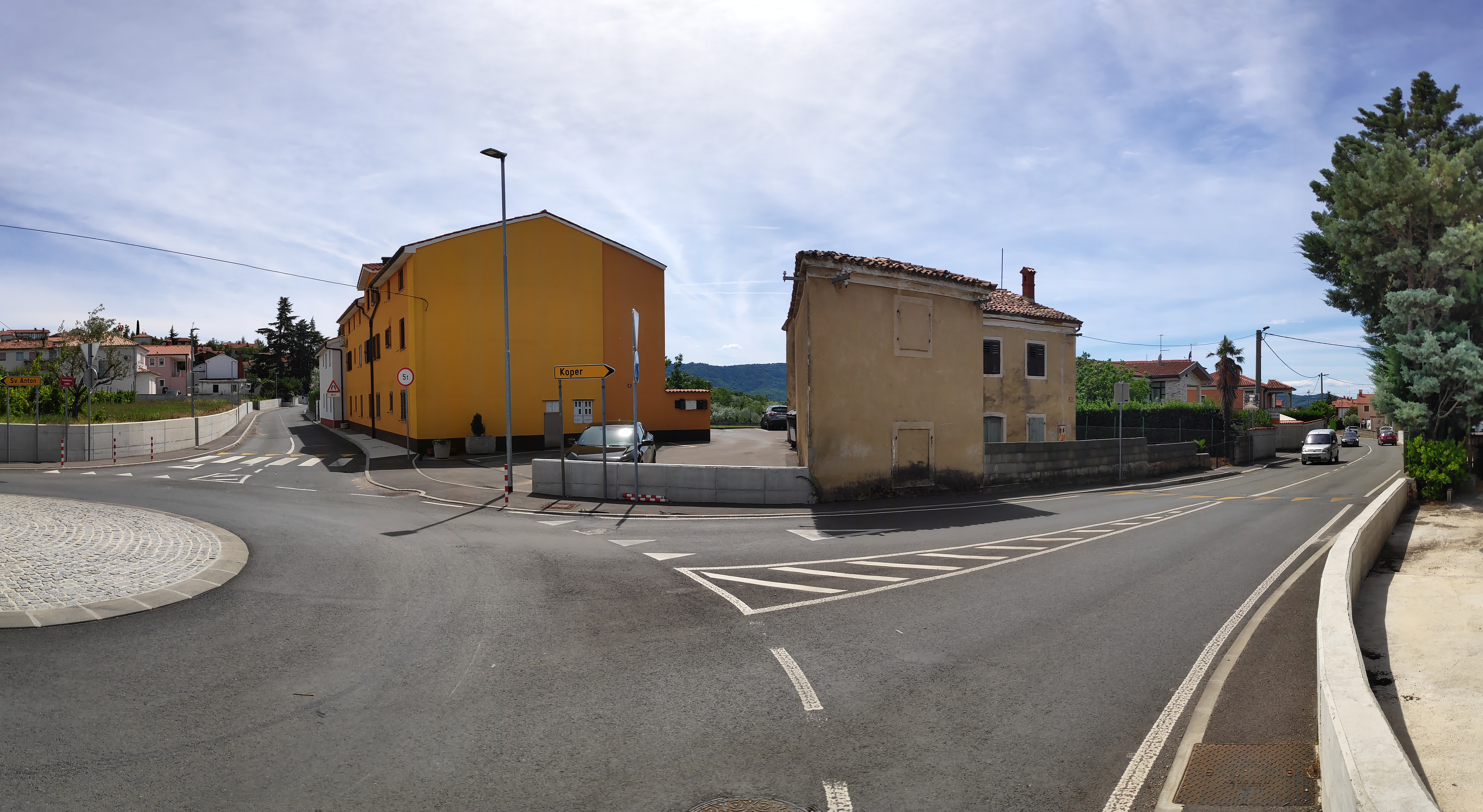

- Location in Slovenia
- Coordinates: 45°32′23.88″N 13°47′38.85″E
- Country: Slovenia
- Traditional region: Littoral
- Statistical region: Coastal–Karst
- Municipality: Koper

Area
  - Total: 2.07 km^{2} (0.80 sq mi)
- Elevation: 92 m (302 ft)

Population (2002)
  - Total: 1,011

Pobegi (pronounced [pɔˈbeːɡi]; Italian: Pobeghi) is a settlement in the City Municipality of Koper in the Littoral region of Slovenia.
