= Premančan =

Premančan Premanzano
- Location in Slovenia
- Coordinates: 45°35′1.22″N 13°46′28.59″E
- Country: Slovenia
- Traditional region: Littoral
- Statistical region: Coastal–Karst
- Municipality: Koper

Area
  - Total: 0.89 km^{2} (0.34 sq mi)
- Elevation: 138.1 m (453 ft)

Population (2002)
  - Total: 156

Premančan (pronounced [pɾɛmanˈtʃaːn]; Italian: Premanzano) is a village in the City Municipality of Koper in the Littoral region of Slovenia on the border with Italy.
