= Pisari =

- Location in Slovenia
- Coordinates: 45°27′25.68″N 13°53′47.47″E
- Country: Slovenia
- Traditional region: Littoral
- Statistical region: Coastal–Karst
- Municipality: Koper

Area
  - Total: 0.26 km^{2} (0.10 sq mi)
- Elevation: 177.3 m (582 ft)

Population (2002)
  - Total: 5

Pisari (pronounced [piˈsaːɾi]) is a small settlement in the City Municipality of Koper in the Littoral region of Slovenia close to the border with Croatia.
