= Šeki =

Šeki Sechi
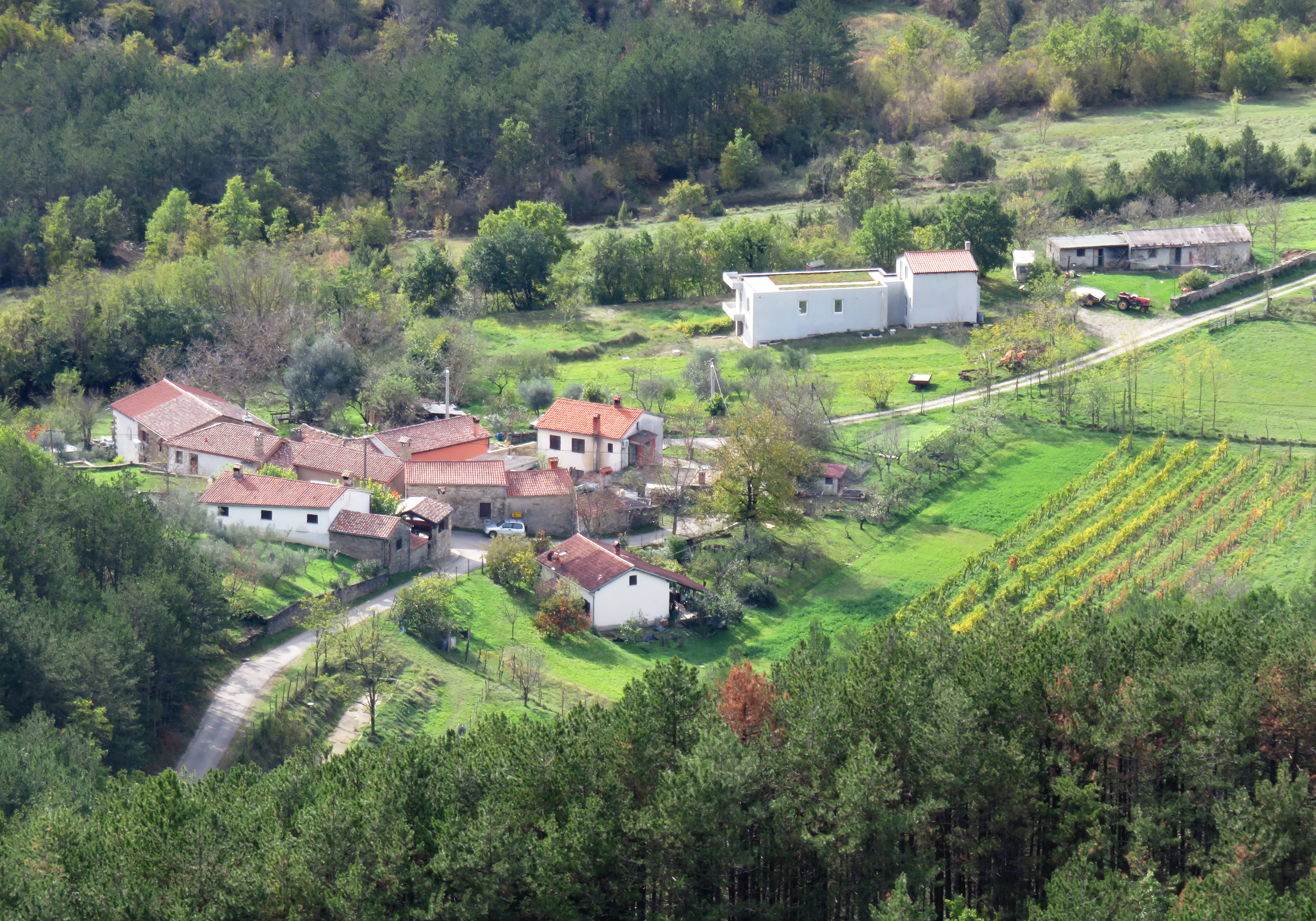

- Location in Slovenia
- Coordinates: 45°27′20.98″N 13°54′4.13″E
- Country: Slovenia
- Traditional region: Littoral
- Statistical region: Coastal–Karst
- Municipality: Koper

Area
  - Total: 0.25 km^{2} (0.097 sq mi)
- Elevation: 170.5 m (559 ft)

Population (2002)
  - Total: 5

Šeki (pronounced [ˈʃeːki]; Italian: Sechi) is a small settlement in the City Municipality of Koper in the Littoral region of Slovenia close to the border with Croatia.
