= Trebeše =

Trebeše Trebesse
- Location in Slovenia
- Coordinates: 45°28′19.69″N 13°51′25.98″E
- Country: Slovenia
- Traditional region: Littoral
- Statistical region: Coastal–Karst
- Municipality: Koper

Area
  - Total: 2.47 km^{2} (0.95 sq mi)
- Elevation: 340.6 m (1,117 ft)

Population (2002)
  - Total: 60
  - Density: 24/km^{2} (63/sq mi)
- Time zone: UTC+1
- Postal Code: 6272
- Area code: (+386) 05
- Vehicle registration: KP

Trebeše (pronounced [tɾɛˈbeːʃɛ]; Italian: Trebesse) is a small village in the City Municipality of Koper in the Littoral region of Slovenia.

The local church is dedicated to Saint Martin and belongs to the Parish of Sočerga.
