= Kampel, Koper =

Kampel Campel
- Location in Slovenia
- Coordinates: 45°30′55.57″N 13°44′37.53″E
- Country: Slovenia
- Traditional region: Littoral
- Statistical region: Coastal–Karst
- Municipality: Koper

Area
  - Total: 1.96 km^{2} (0.76 sq mi)
- Elevation: 76.1 m (250 ft)

Population (2002)
  - Total: 565

Kampel (pronounced [kamˈpeːl] or [kamˈpeːu̯]; Italian: Campel) is a settlement south of Škocjan in the City Municipality of Koper in the Littoral region of Slovenia.
