= Zupančič =

Zupančič is the 5th most frequent surname in Slovenia, and may refer to:

- Alenka Zupančič (born 1966), Slovenian philosopher
- Boštjan Zupančič (born 1947), Slovenian lawyer, a justice of the European Court of Human Rights
- Milena Zupančič (1946–2026), Slovenian actor
- Rihard Zupančič (1878–1949), Slovenian mathematician

Variant Župančič:

- Oton Župančič (1878–1949), Slovenian poet
