= Poletiči =

Poletiči Poletici
- Location in Slovenia
- Coordinates: 45°29′44.49″N 13°51′50.99″E
- Country: Slovenia
- Traditional region: Littoral
- Statistical region: Coastal–Karst
- Municipality: Koper

Area
  - Total: 1.88 km^{2} (0.73 sq mi)
- Elevation: 347.1 m (1,139 ft)

Population (2002)
  - Total: 47

Poletiči (pronounced [pɔˈleːtitʃi]; Italian: Poletici) is a small settlement in the City Municipality of Koper in the Littoral region of Slovenia.
