= Movraž =

Movraž Valmorasa
- Location in Slovenia
- Coordinates: 45°28′39.3″N 13°55′3.39″E
- Country: Slovenia
- Traditional region: Littoral
- Statistical region: Coastal–Karst
- Municipality: Koper

Area
  - Total: 5.34 km^{2} (2.06 sq mi)
- Elevation: 213.8 m (701 ft)

Population (2002)
  - Total: 104

Movraž (pronounced [mɔu̯ˈɾaːʃ] or [ˈmoːu̯ɾaʃ]; Italian: Valmorasa) is a small village in the City Municipality of Koper in the Littoral region of Slovenia.

The parish church in the settlement is dedicated to the Assumption of Mary.
