= Srgaši =

Srgaši Sergassi
- Location in Slovenia
- Coordinates: 45°30′34.58″N 13°41′33.52″E
- Country: Slovenia
- Traditional region: Littoral
- Statistical region: Coastal–Karst
- Municipality: Koper

Area
  - Total: 1.45 km^{2} (0.56 sq mi)
- Elevation: 173.4 m (569 ft)

Population (2002)
  - Total: 148

Srgaši (pronounced [səɾˈɡaːʃi]; in older sources also Sergaši; Italian: Sergassi) is a settlement in the City Municipality of Koper in the Littoral region of Slovenia.

== Geography ==
Srgaši is a clustered village on the south slope of Gažon Hill (Slovene: Gažonski hrib; 207 meters or 679 feet) along a road that branches off at the hamlet of Križišče from the main road between Šmarje and Koper. It includes the hamlets of Čepelje, Križišče, Na Loži, and Petričevci. Vineyards interspersed with fruit trees (cherries, plums, and olives) stand below the village. Kramar and Fontana Springs lie below the hamlet of Križišče.

== Name ==
Srgaši is a plural name. It is said to be derived from the surname Sergaš, referring to a village inhabited by families with this surname.

== History ==
After the Second World War, there was a major population shift in the village. In 1900, 14% of the population (32 of 225 residents) were Italian speakers, but in 1957 only five residents declared themselves Italian.

== Notable people ==
Notable people that were born or lived in Srgaši include:

- Humbert "Bert" Pribac (born 1933), poet
