= Kodreti =

Kodreti Codreti
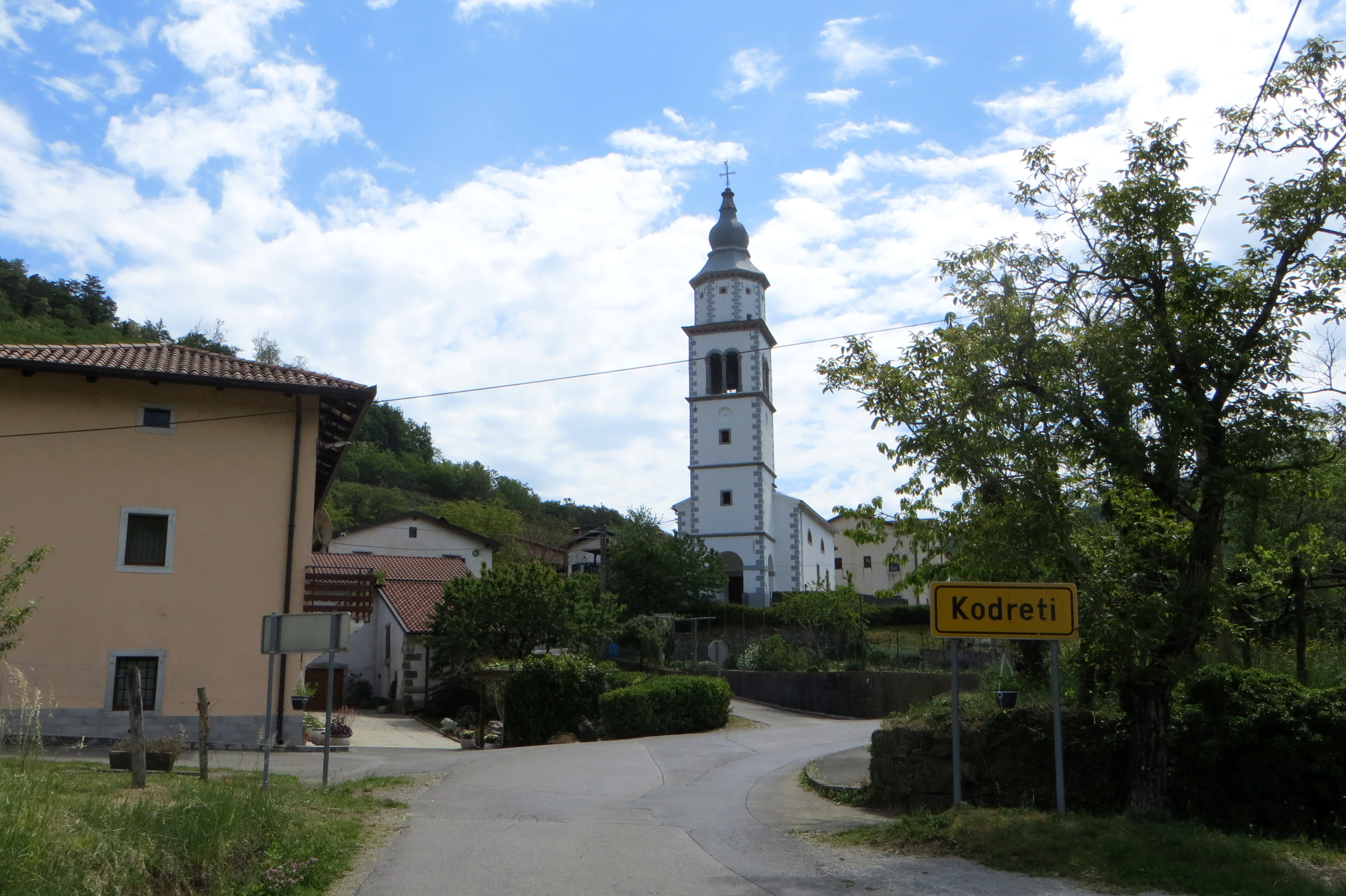

- Location in Slovenia
- Coordinates: 45°49′1.7″N 13°53′18.75″E
- Country: Slovenia
- Traditional region: Slovene Littoral
- Statistical region: Coastal–Karst
- Municipality: Komen

Area
  - Total: 1.04 km^{2} (0.40 sq mi)
- Elevation: 165.9 m (544 ft)

Population (2002)
  - Total: 38

Kodreti (pronounced [kɔˈdɾeːti]; Italian: Codreti) is a small village east of Štanjel in the Municipality of Komen in the Littoral region of Slovenia next to the border with Italy.

The parish church in the settlement serves all the surrounding villages of Koboli, Večkoti, Čehovini, Dolanci, and Trebižani, and is known as the Parish of Branica. It is dedicated to Saint Catherine and belongs to the Diocese of Koper. Originally the church stood on Lukovnik Hill above the village. It was dedicated in 1518. It was abandoned and demolished after the religious reforms of Joseph II were put into effect. A second church was built in Dolanci in 1805, but was also later abandoned; according to local tradition, a fight that led to bloodshed inside the church had desecrated the site. The current church was built in 1879 and extended in 1896, when the belfry was added.
