= Zagrajec =

Zagrajec Zagraie
- Location in Slovenia
- Coordinates: 45°49′5.28″N 13°41′53.95″E
- Country: Slovenia
- Traditional region: Slovene Littoral
- Statistical region: Coastal–Karst
- Municipality: Komen

Area
  - Total: 1.71 km^{2} (0.66 sq mi)
- Elevation: 310 m (1,020 ft)

Population (2002)
  - Total: 23

Zagrajec (pronounced [zaˈɡɾaːjəts]; Italian: Zagraie) is a small village west of Ivanji Grad in the Municipality of Komen in the Littoral region of Slovenia.
