= Volčji Grad =

Volčji Grad Volci
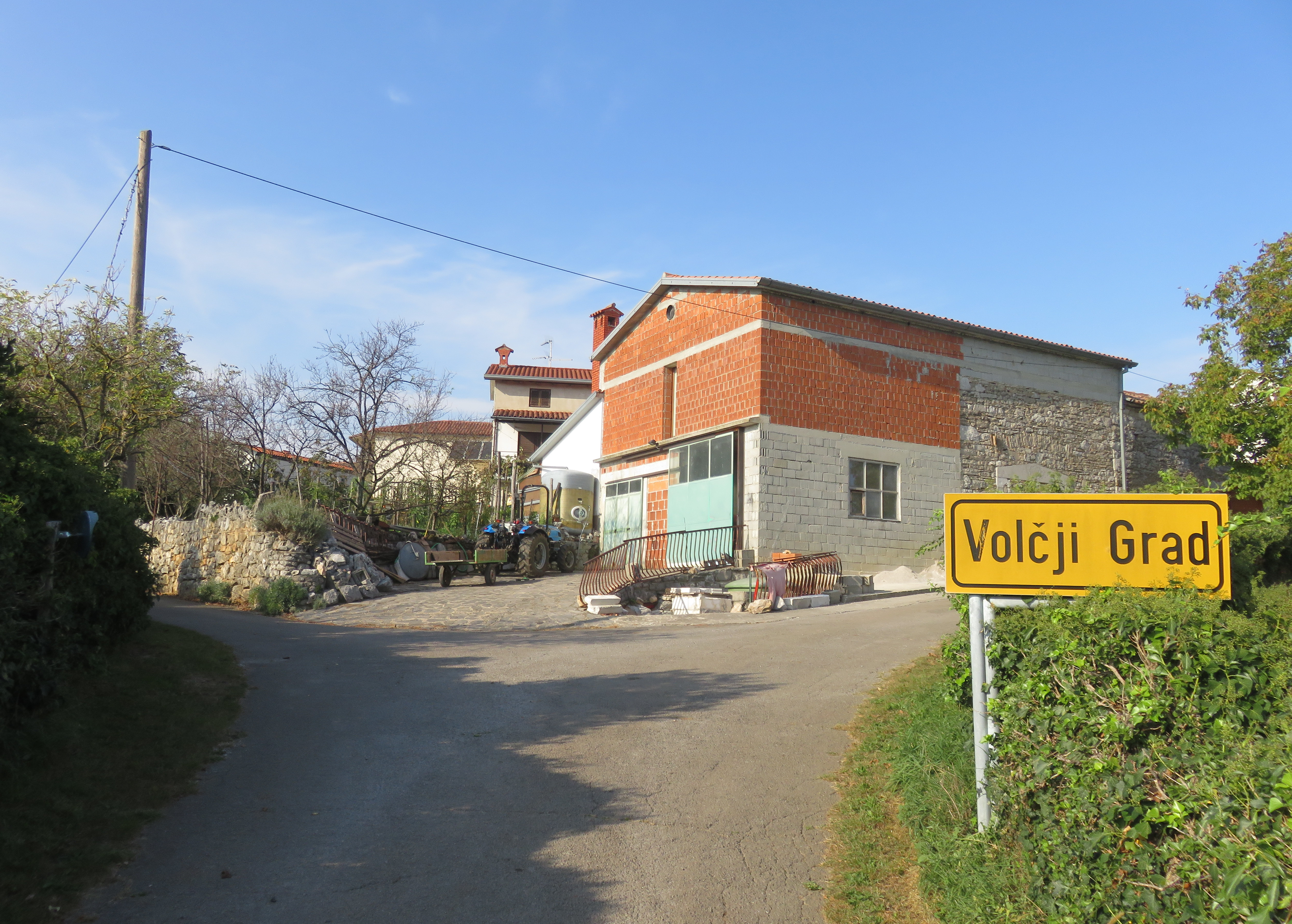

- Location in Slovenia
- Coordinates: 45°48′1.98″N 13°45′2.11″E
- Country: Slovenia
- Traditional region: Slovene Littoral
- Statistical region: Coastal–Karst
- Municipality: Komen

Area
  - Total: 4.8 km^{2} (1.9 sq mi)
- Elevation: 250.4 m (822 ft)

Population (2002)
  - Total: 99

Volčji Grad (pronounced [ˈʋoːu̯tʃji ˈɡɾaːt]; Italian: Volci) is a village in the Municipality of Komen in the Littoral region of Slovenia.

== Church ==
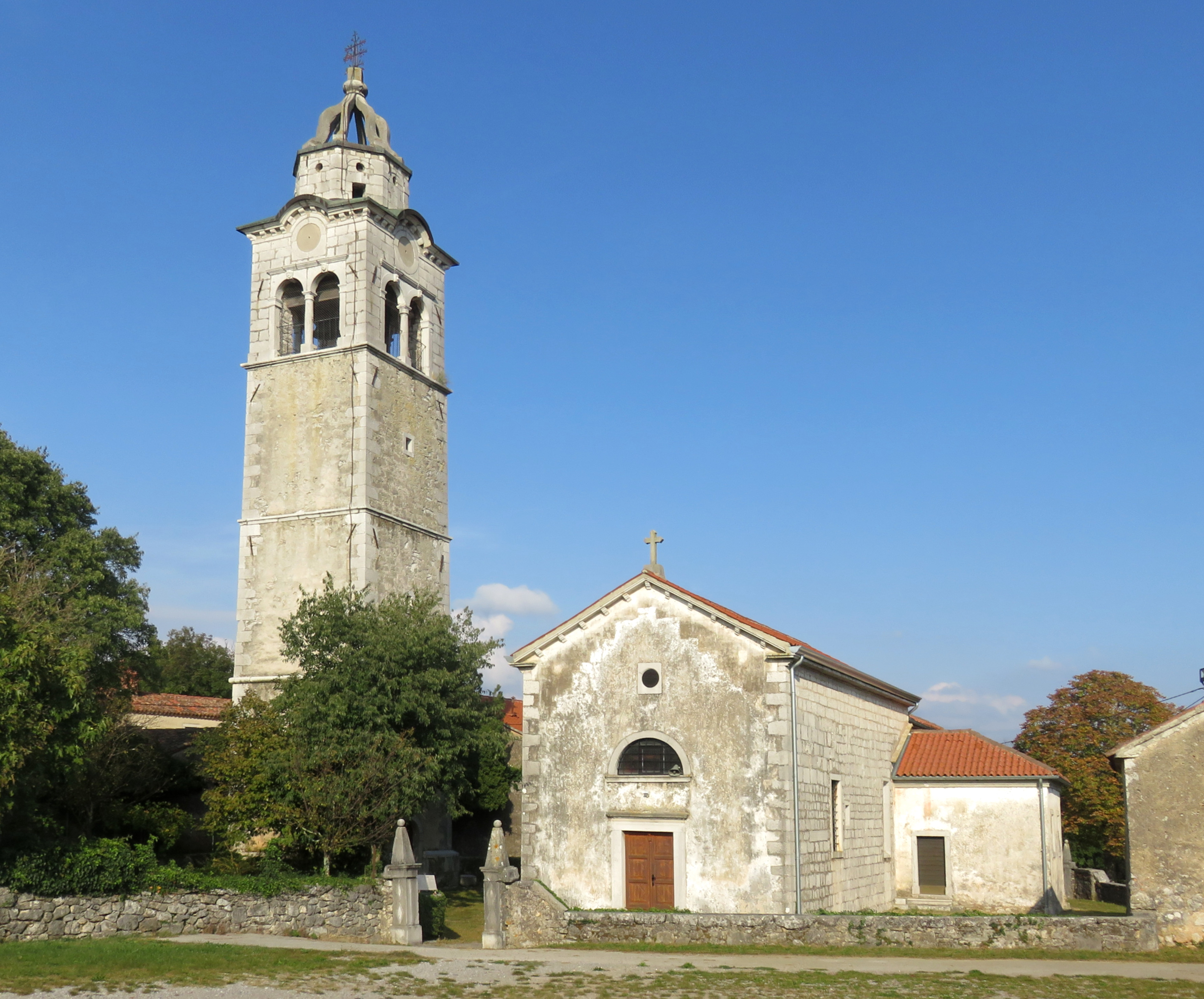
Saint John the Baptist Church

The local church is dedicated to John the Baptist and belongs to the Parish of Komen.
