= Vale, Slovenia =

Vale Valle
- Location in Slovenia
- Coordinates: 45°48′52.81″N 13°40′15.11″E
- Country: Slovenia
- Traditional region: Slovene Littoral
- Statistical region: Coastal–Karst
- Municipality: Komen

Area
  - Total: 3.42 km^{2} (1.32 sq mi)
- Elevation: 136.3 m (447 ft)

Population (2002)
  - Total: 21

Vale (pronounced [ˈʋaːlɛ]; Italian: Valle) is a small settlement west of Gorjansko in the Municipality of Komen in the Littoral region of Slovenia on the border with Italy.
