= Klanec pri Komnu =

Klanec pri Komnu Clanzi in Valle
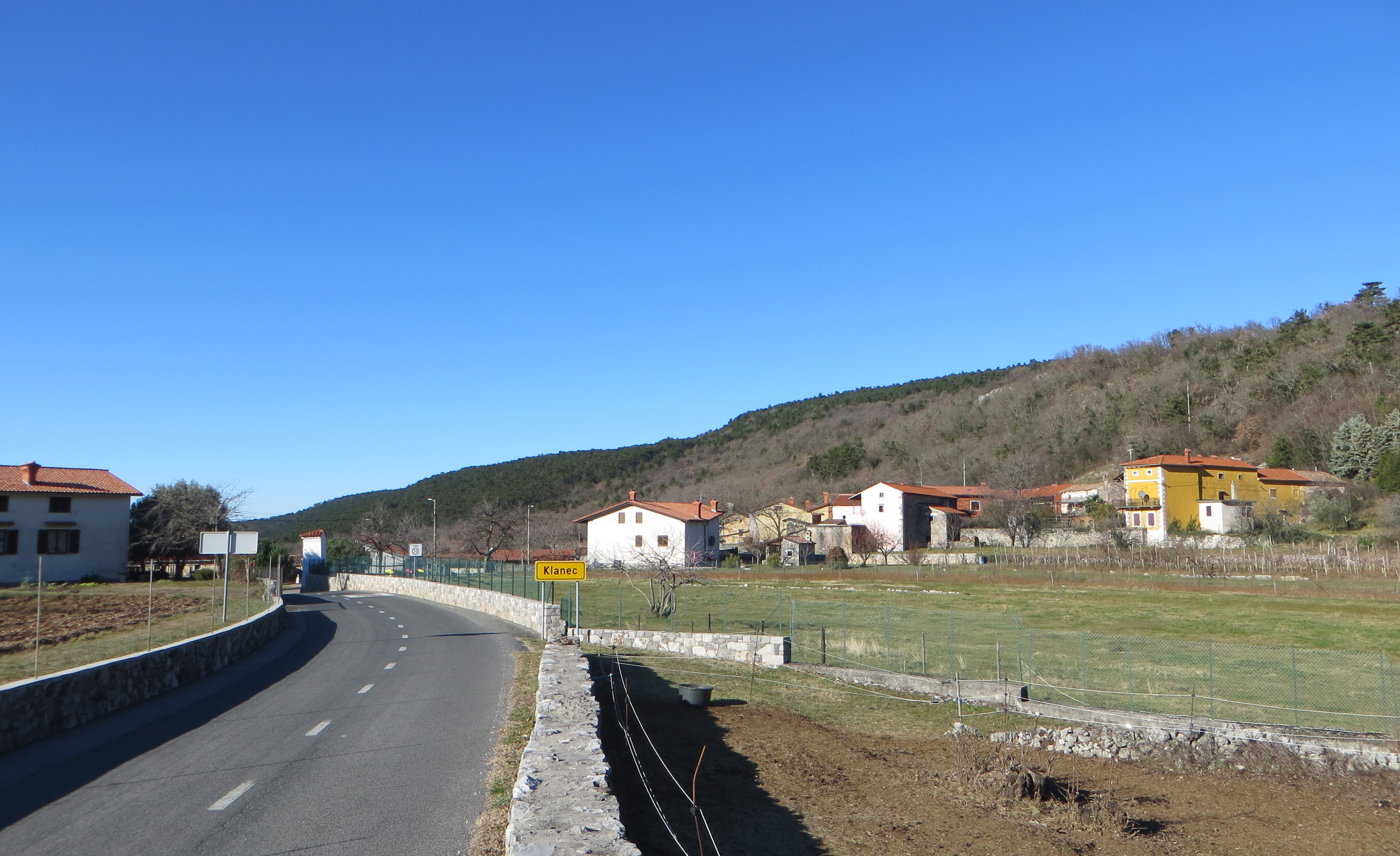

- Location in Slovenia
- Coordinates: 45°48′41.13″N 13°41′38.3″E
- Country: Slovenia
- Traditional region: Slovene Littoral
- Statistical region: Coastal–Karst
- Municipality: Komen

Area
  - Total: 1.02 km^{2} (0.39 sq mi)
- Elevation: 183.8 m (603 ft)

Population (2002)
  - Total: 48

Klanec pri Komnu (pronounced [ˈklaːnəts pɾi ˈkoːmnu]; Italian: Clanzi in Valle) is a small village west of Komen in the Littoral region of Slovenia close to the border with Italy.

== Name ==
The name of the settlement was changed from Klanec to Klanec pri Komnu in 1953.

== Cultural heritage ==
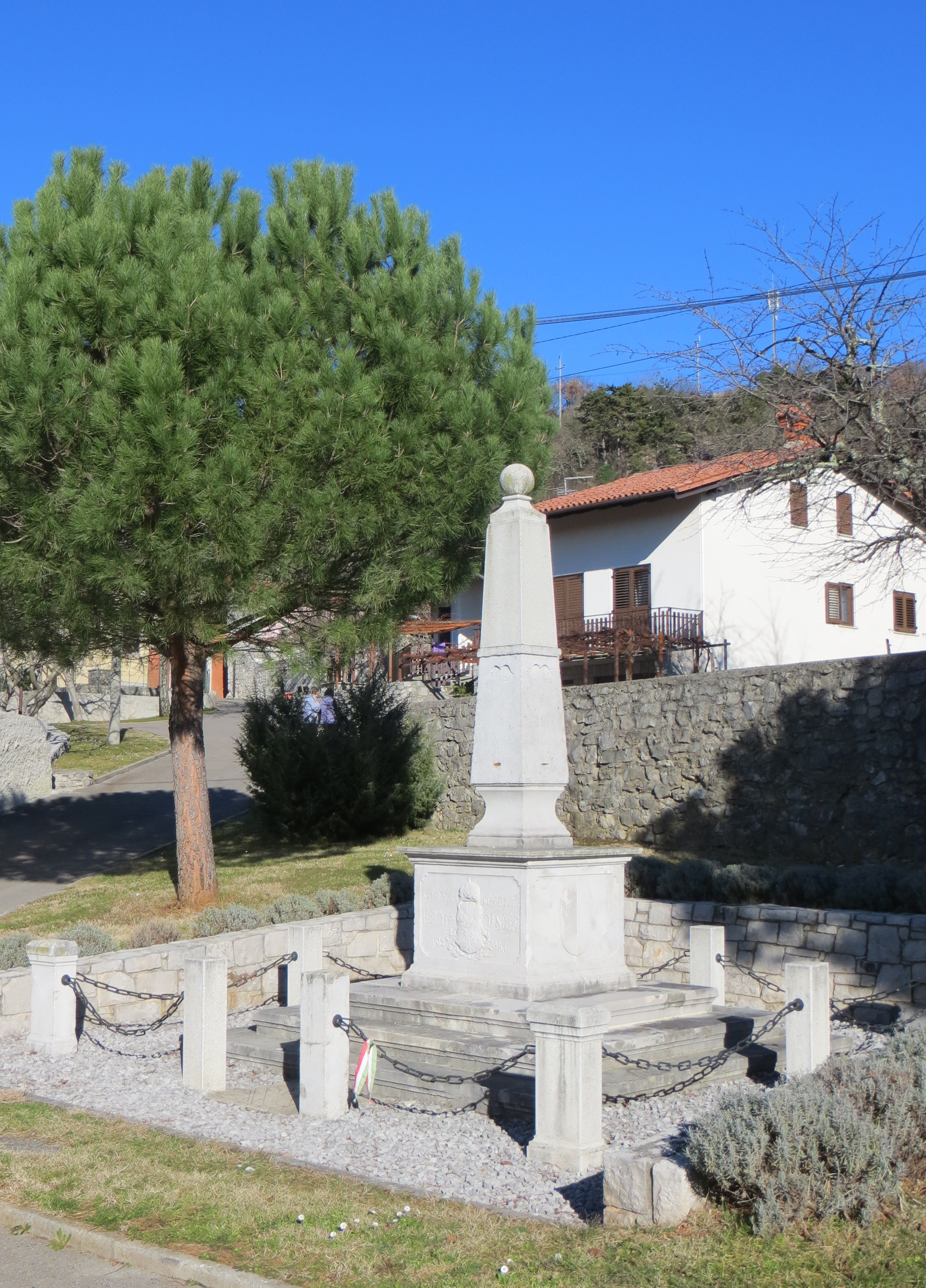
First World War monument

There is a stone monument in the center of the village commemorating Hungarian soldiers killed in the First World War. The monument stands on a stepped plinth; it consists of a cube engraved with the Hungarian coat of arms and the years 1915–1916 topped by an obelisk. It is surrounded by small pillars, of which two are preserved originals.
