= Šibelji =

Šibelji Sibèglia
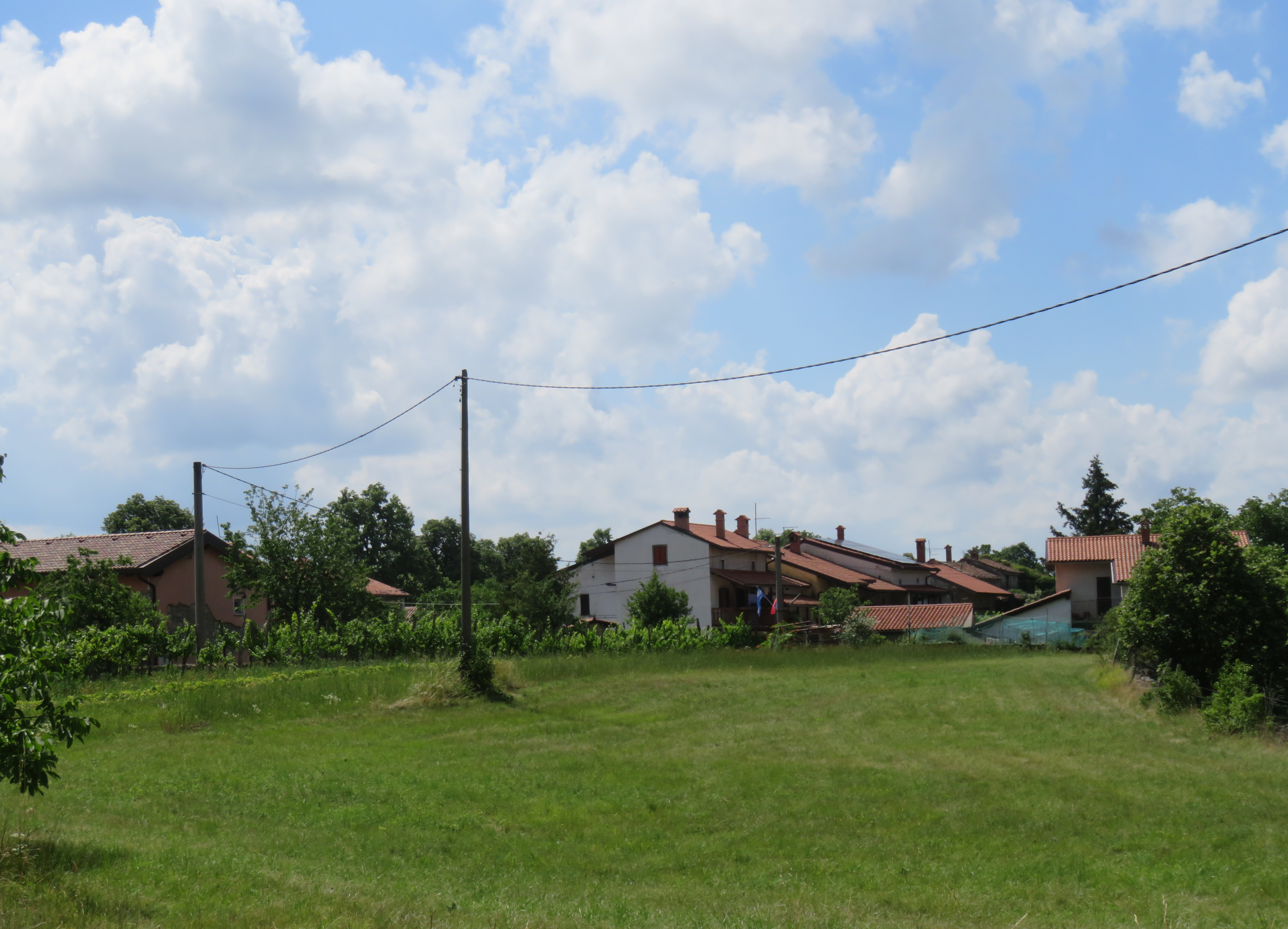

- Location in Slovenia
- Coordinates: 45°51′2.19″N 13°43′16.99″E
- Country: Slovenia
- Traditional region: Slovene Littoral
- Statistical region: Coastal–Karst
- Municipality: Komen

Area
  - Total: 2.8 km^{2} (1.1 sq mi)
- Elevation: 366 m (1,201 ft)

Population (2002)
  - Total: 11

Šibelji (pronounced [ʃiˈbeːlji]; Italian: Sibèglia) is a small settlement in the Municipality of Komen in the Littoral region of Slovenia.
