= Coljava =

Coljava Zolliava
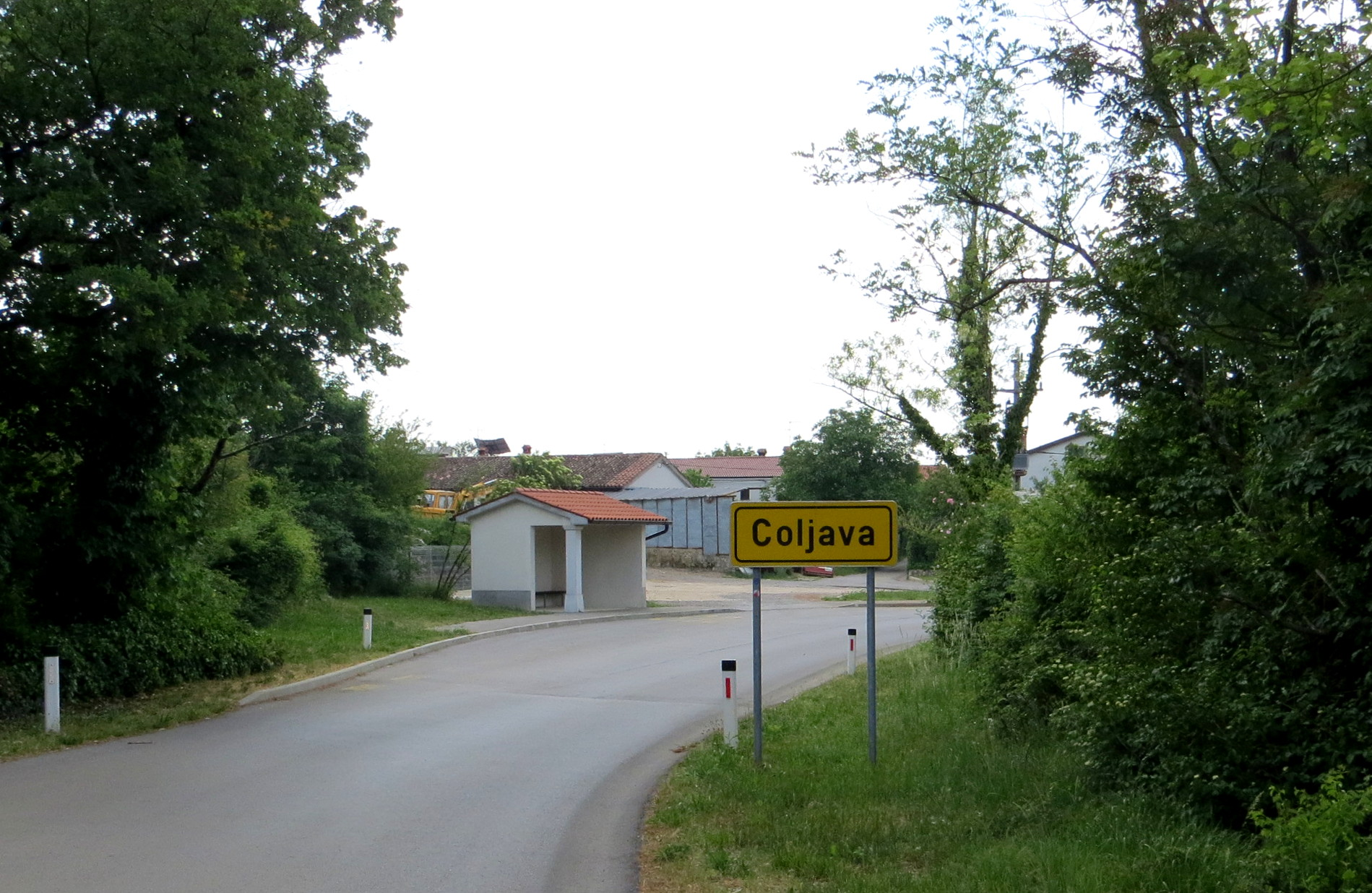

- Location in Slovenia
- Coordinates: 45°48′9.36″N 13°46′59.08″E
- Country: Slovenia
- Traditional region: Slovene Littoral
- Statistical region: Coastal–Karst
- Municipality: Komen

Area
  - Total: 4.4 km^{2} (1.7 sq mi)
- Elevation: 263.1 m (863 ft)

Population (2002)
  - Total: 48

Coljava (pronounced [tsɔˈljaːʋa]; Italian: Zolliava) is a small settlement in the Municipality of Komen in the Littoral region of Slovenia.
