= Brestovica pri Komnu =

Brestovica pri Komnu Brestovizza in Valle
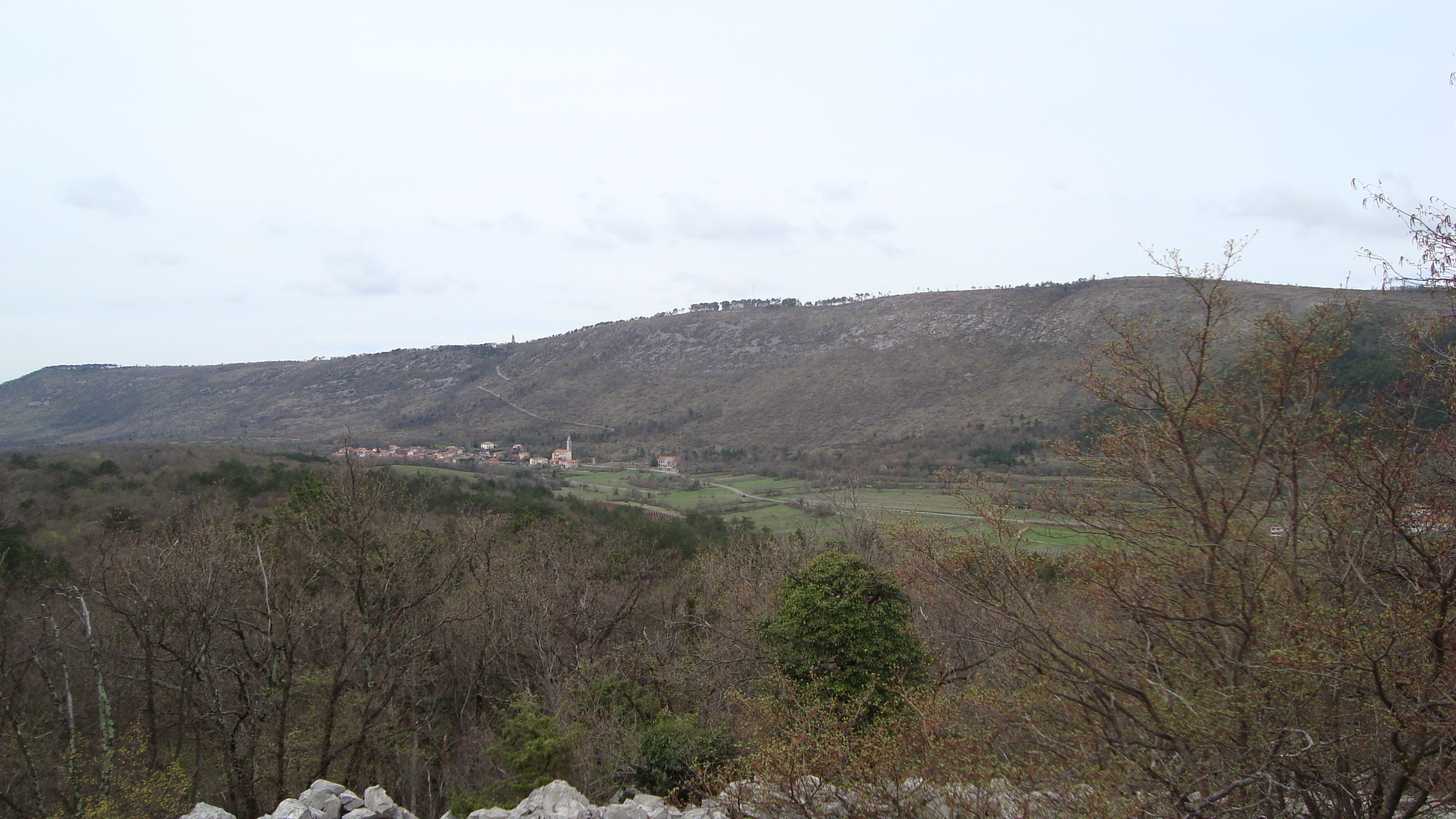

- Location in Slovenia
- Coordinates: 45°48′42.24″N 13°38′34.84″E
- Country: Slovenia
- Traditional region: Slovene Littoral
- Statistical region: Coastal–Karst
- Municipality: Komen

Area
  - Total: 9.48 km^{2} (3.66 sq mi)
- Elevation: 53.4 m (175 ft)

Population (2002)
  - Total: 204

Brestovica pri Komnu (pronounced [bɾɛstɔˈʋiːtsa pɾi ˈkoːmnu]; Italian: Brestovizza in Valle) is a village in the Municipality of Komen in the Littoral region of Slovenia next to the border with Italy.

== Name ==
The name of the settlement was changed from Brestovica to Brestovica pri Komnu in 1953.

== Church ==
The parish church in the settlement is dedicated to Saint Lawrence and belongs to the Diocese of Koper. A second church in the hamlet of Gornja Brestovica in the settlement is dedicated to Saint Anastasia.
