= Gabrovica pri Komnu =

Gabrovica pri Komnu Gabrovizza
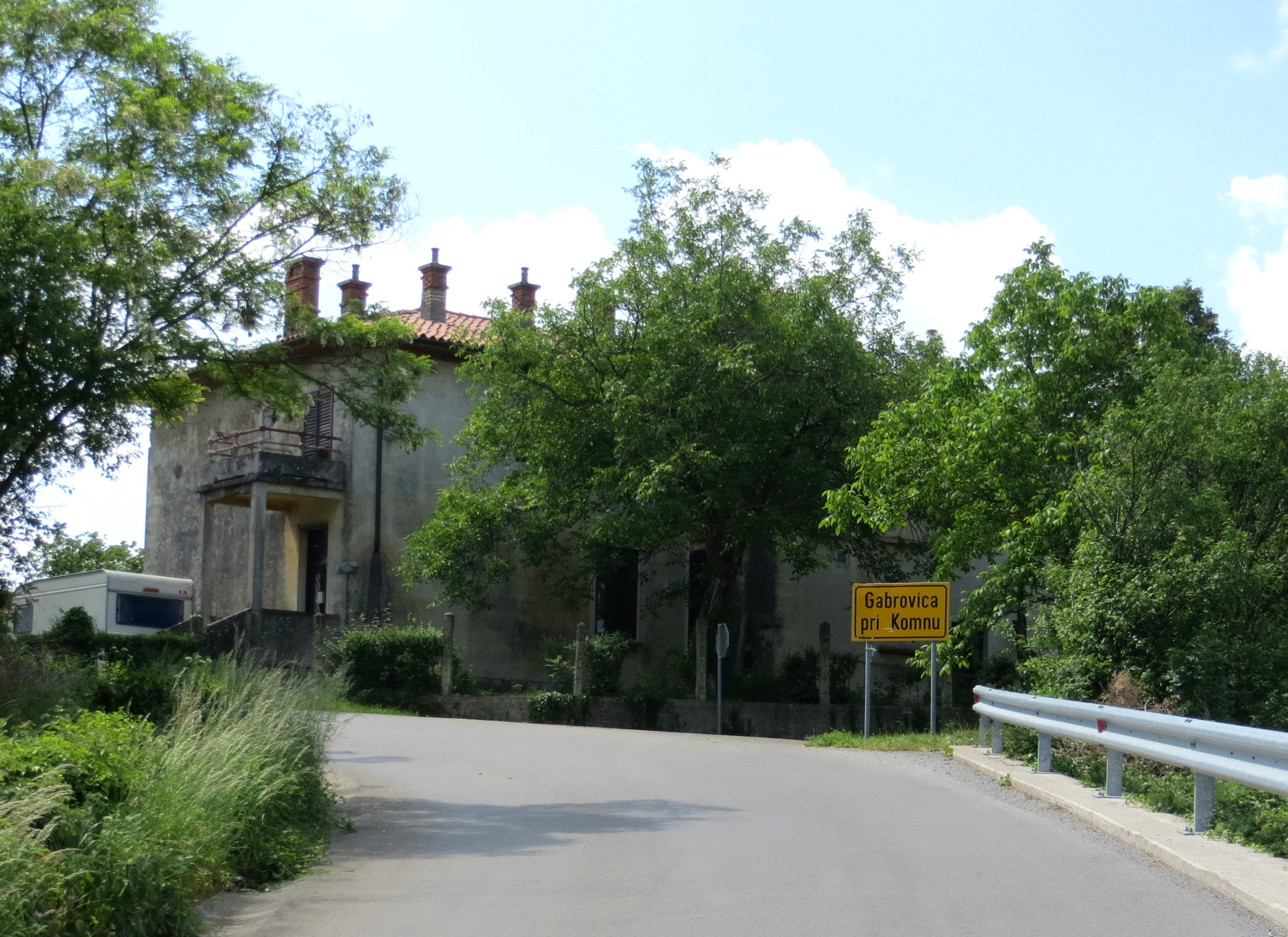

- Location in Slovenia
- Coordinates: 45°48′23.81″N 13°46′47.18″E
- Country: Slovenia
- Traditional region: Slovene Littoral
- Statistical region: Coastal–Karst
- Municipality: Komen

Area
  - Total: 1.8 km^{2} (0.69 sq mi)
- Elevation: 278.2 m (913 ft)

Population (2002)
  - Total: 125

Gabrovica pri Komnu (pronounced [ˈɡaːbɾɔʋitsa pɾi ˈkoːmnu]; Italian: Gabrovizza) is a village in the Municipality of Komen in the Littoral region of Slovenia.

== Church ==
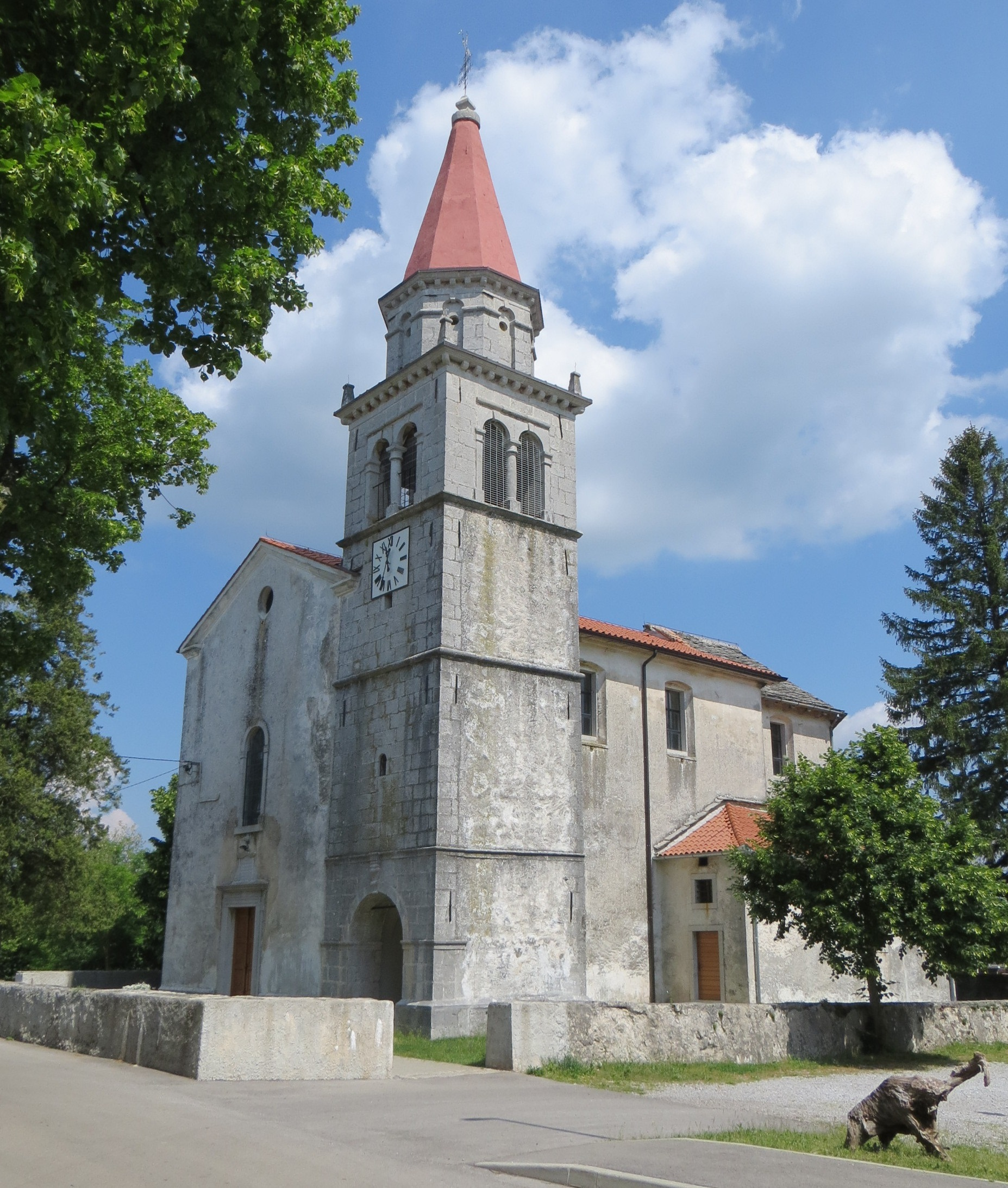
View from the south

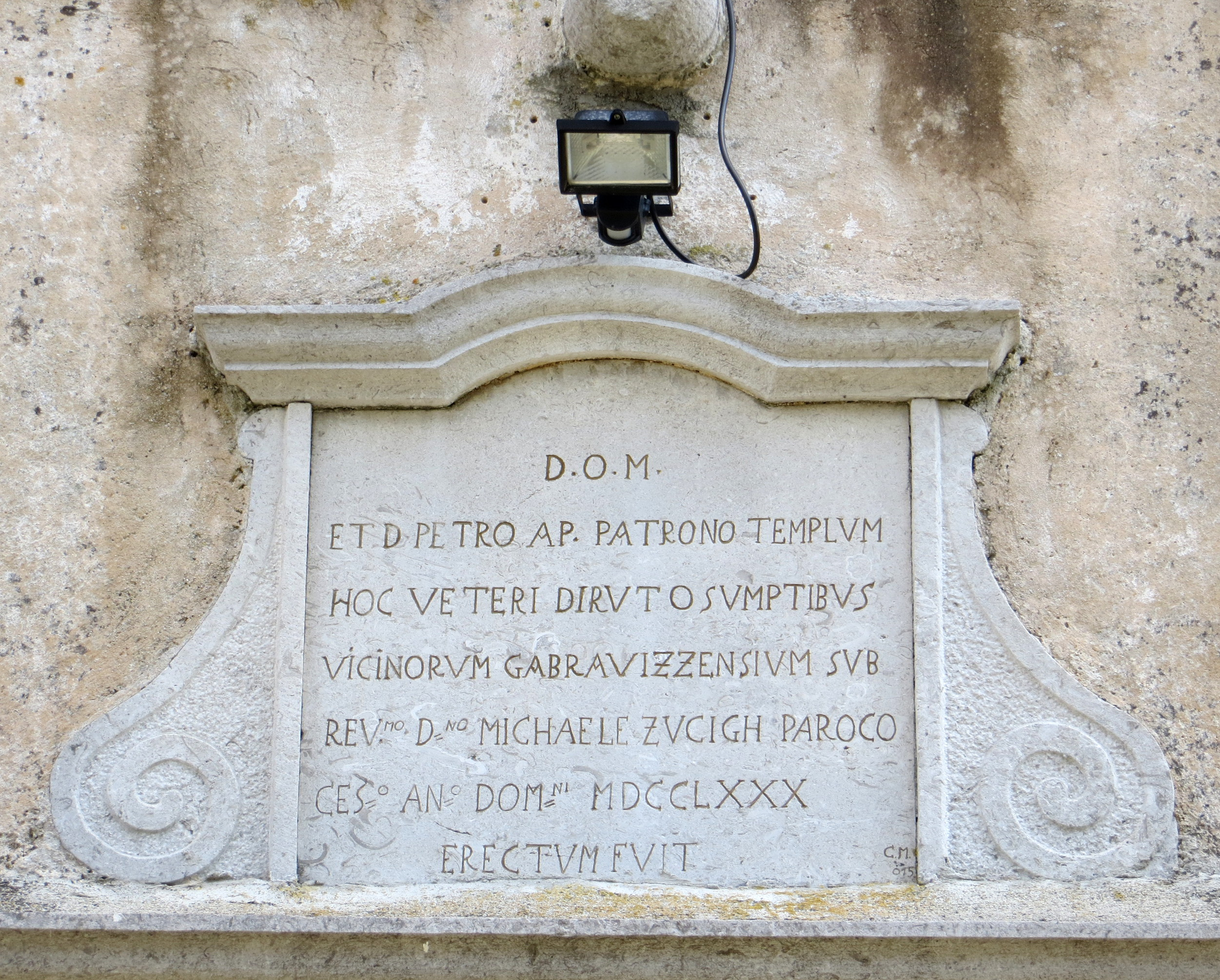
Plaque over the door

Saint Peter's Church

The parish church in the settlement is dedicated to Saint Peter and belongs to the Diocese of Koper. It was built in the Baroque style. A plaque over the door has the year 1780 on it.
