= Tupelče =

Tupelče Villa Tupelce
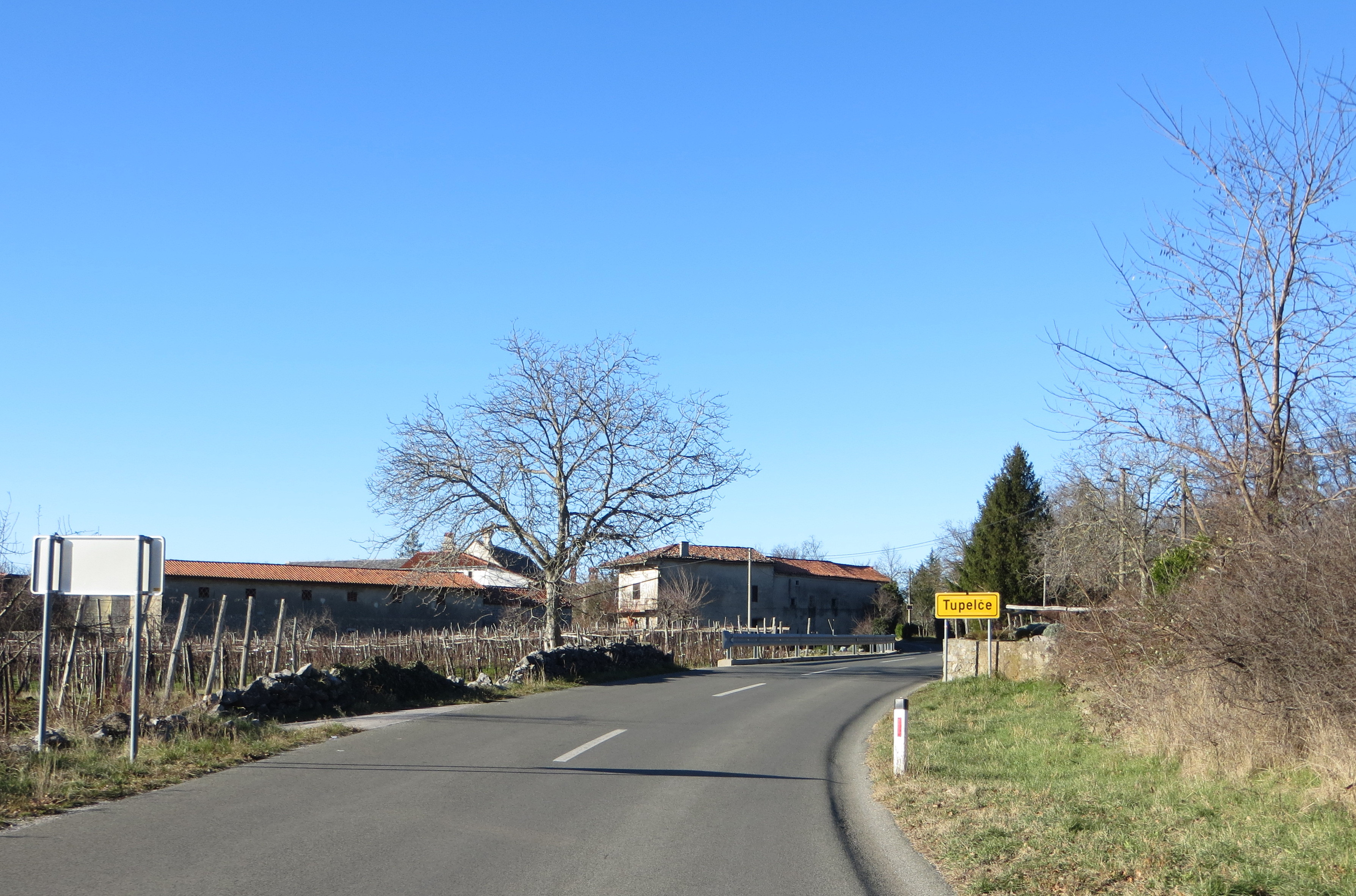

- Location in Slovenia
- Coordinates: 45°48′49.41″N 13°48′50.77″E
- Country: Slovenia
- Traditional region: Slovene Littoral
- Statistical region: Coastal–Karst
- Municipality: Komen

Area
  - Total: 3.24 km^{2} (1.25 sq mi)
- Elevation: 301 m (988 ft)

Population (2002)
  - Total: 59

Tupelče (pronounced [ˈtuːpəltʃɛ]; Italian: Villa Tupelce) is a small village west of Štanjel in the Municipality of Komen in the Littoral region of Slovenia.
