= Rubije =

Rubije Rùbbia
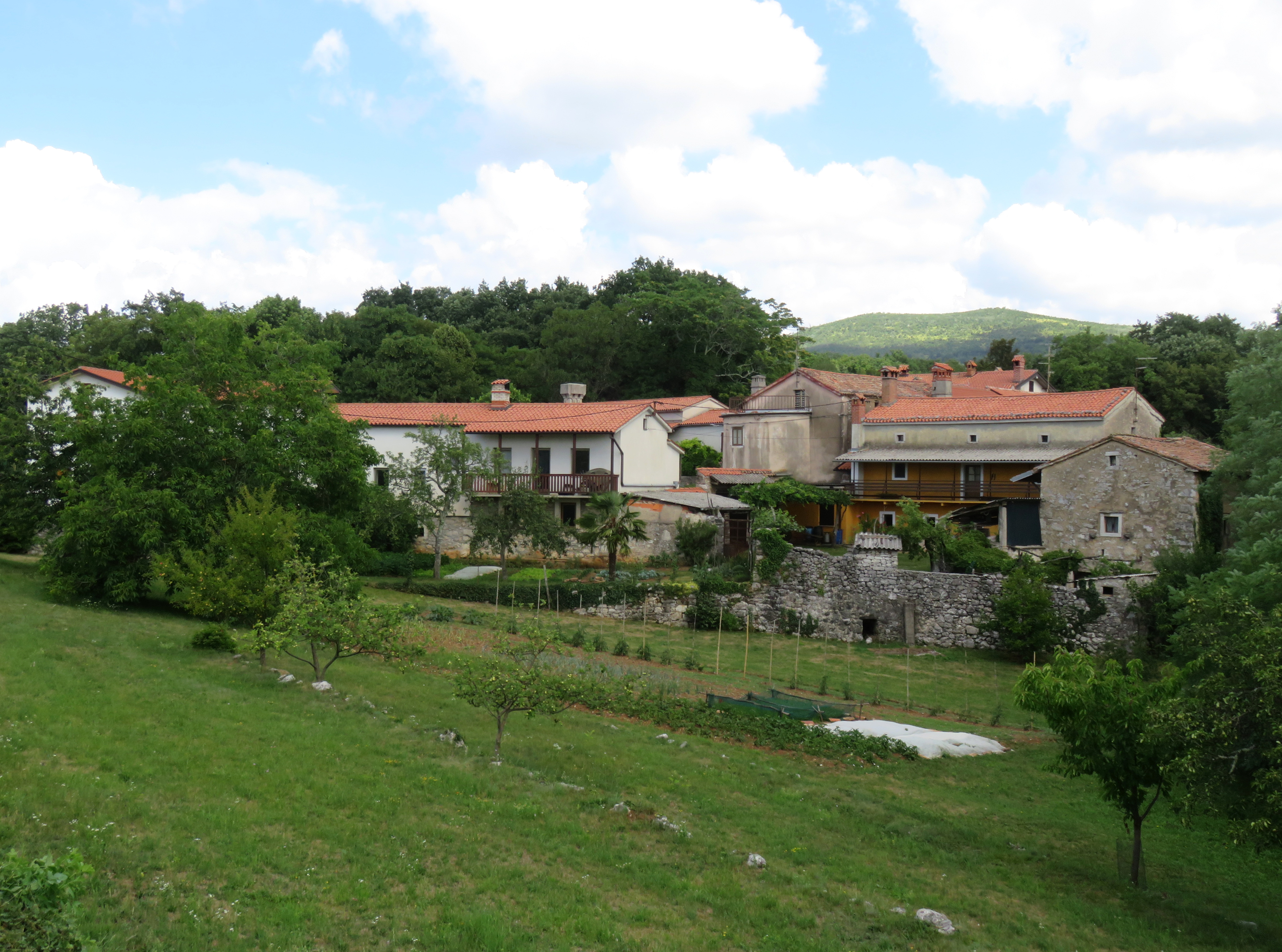

- Location in Slovenia
- Coordinates: 45°50′9.96″N 13°44′38.35″E
- Country: Slovenia
- Traditional region: Slovene Littoral
- Statistical region: Coastal–Karst
- Municipality: Komen

Area
  - Total: 1.91 km^{2} (0.74 sq mi)
- Elevation: 314.6 m (1,032 ft)

Population (2002)
  - Total: 40

Rubije (pronounced [ɾuˈbiːjɛ]; Italian: Rùbbia) is a small village north of Komen in the Littoral region of Slovenia.
