= Hruševica =

Hruševica Crussevizza
- Location in Slovenia
- Coordinates: 45°48′38.27″N 13°49′41.5″E
- Country: Slovenia
- Traditional region: Slovene Littoral
- Statistical region: Coastal–Karst
- Municipality: Komen

Area
  - Total: 3.99 km^{2} (1.54 sq mi)
- Elevation: 291.8 m (957 ft)

Population (2002)
  - Total: 127

Hruševica (pronounced [ˈxɾuːʃɛʋitsa]; Italian: Crussevizza) is a small village southwest of Štanjel in the Municipality of Komen in the Littoral region of Slovenia next to the border with Italy.

The local church is dedicated to Saint Joseph and belongs to the Parish of Štanjel.
