= Škrbina, Komen =

Škrbina Scherbina
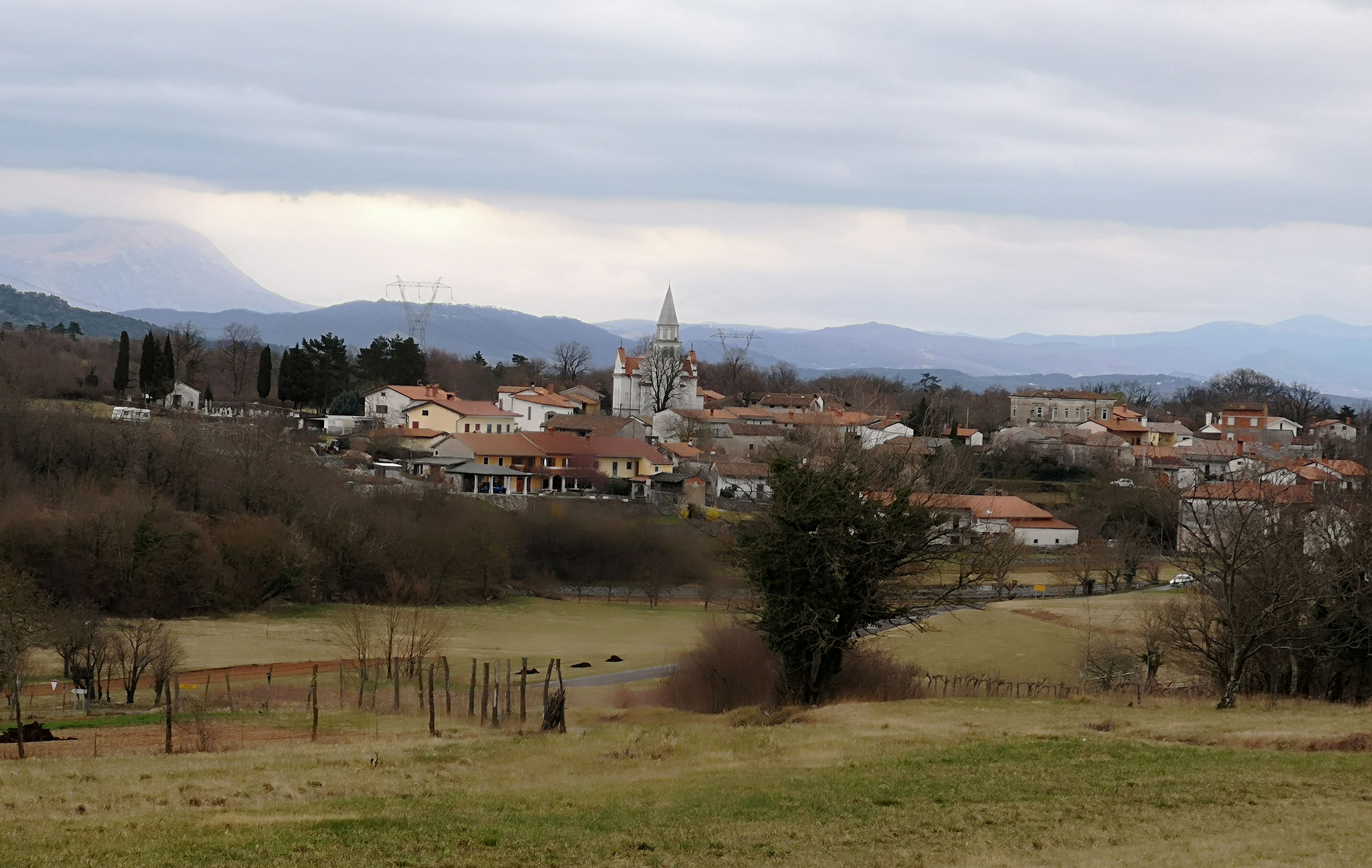

- Location in Slovenia
- Coordinates: 45°50′32.61″N 13°44′6.79″E
- Country: Slovenia
- Traditional region: Slovene Littoral
- Statistical region: Coastal–Karst
- Municipality: Komen

Area
  - Total: 4.05 km^{2} (1.56 sq mi)
- Elevation: 341.7 m (1,121 ft)

Population (2002)
  - Total: 147

Škrbina (pronounced [ʃkəɾˈbiːna], Italian: Scherbina) is a village in the Municipality of Komen in the Littoral region of Slovenia next to the border with Italy.

== Church ==
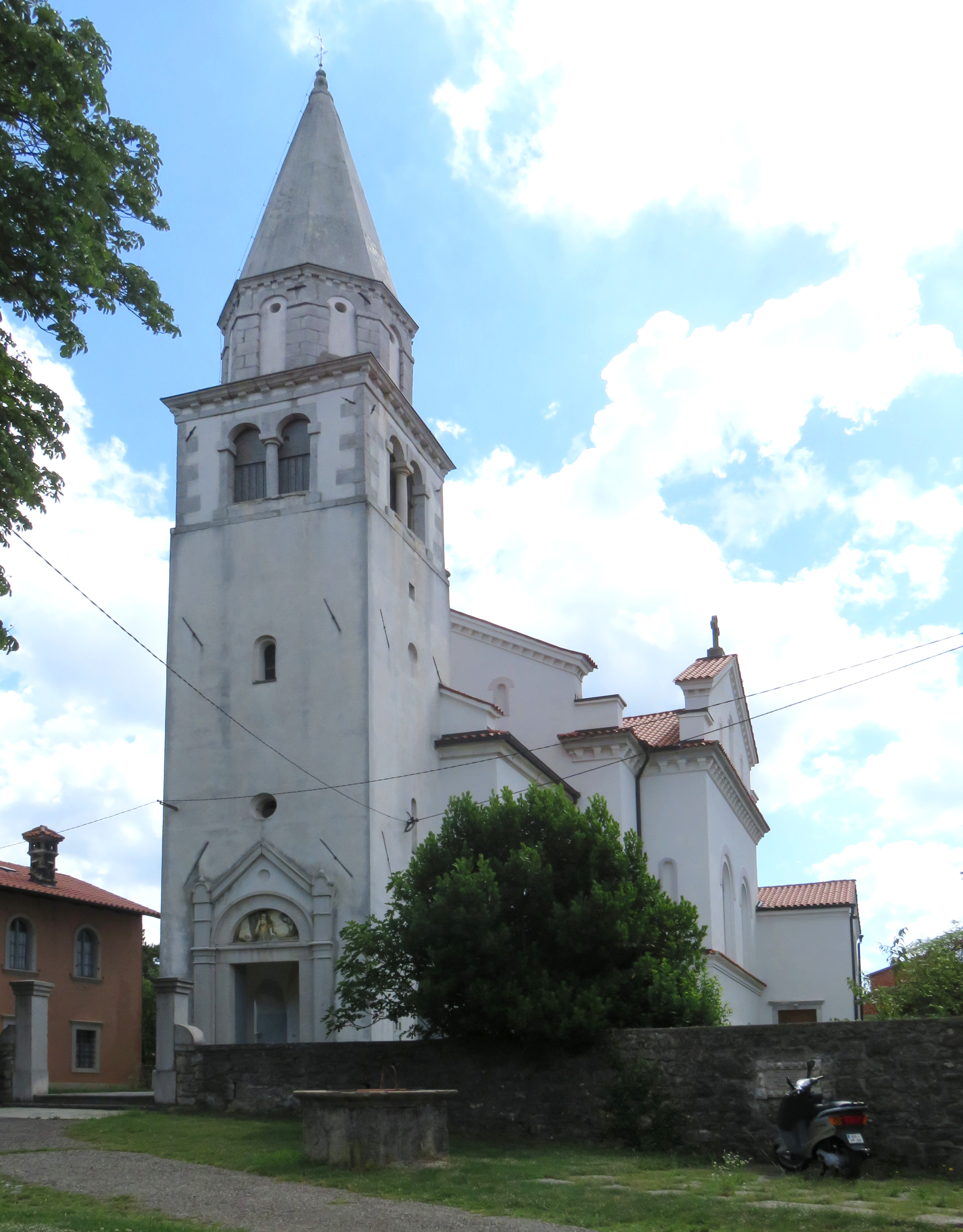
Saint Anthony the Great Church

The parish church in the settlement is dedicated to Saint Anthony the Hermit and belongs to the Diocese of Koper.

== Gallery ==
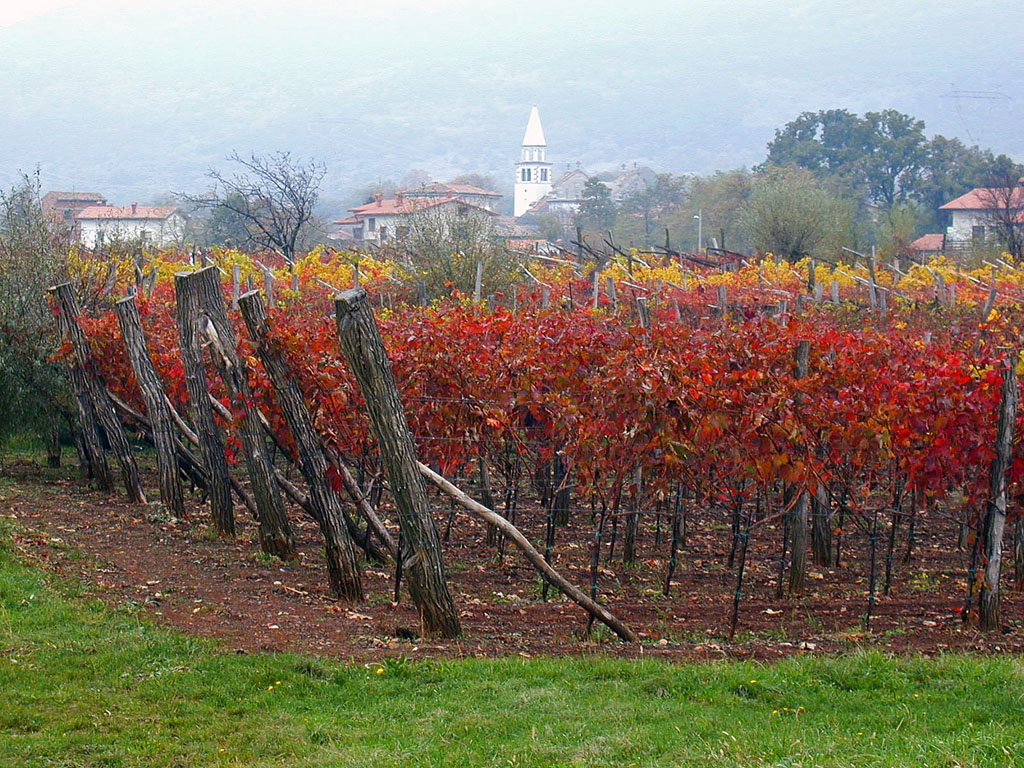
Škrbina
