= Tomačevica =

Tomačevica Tomasevizza
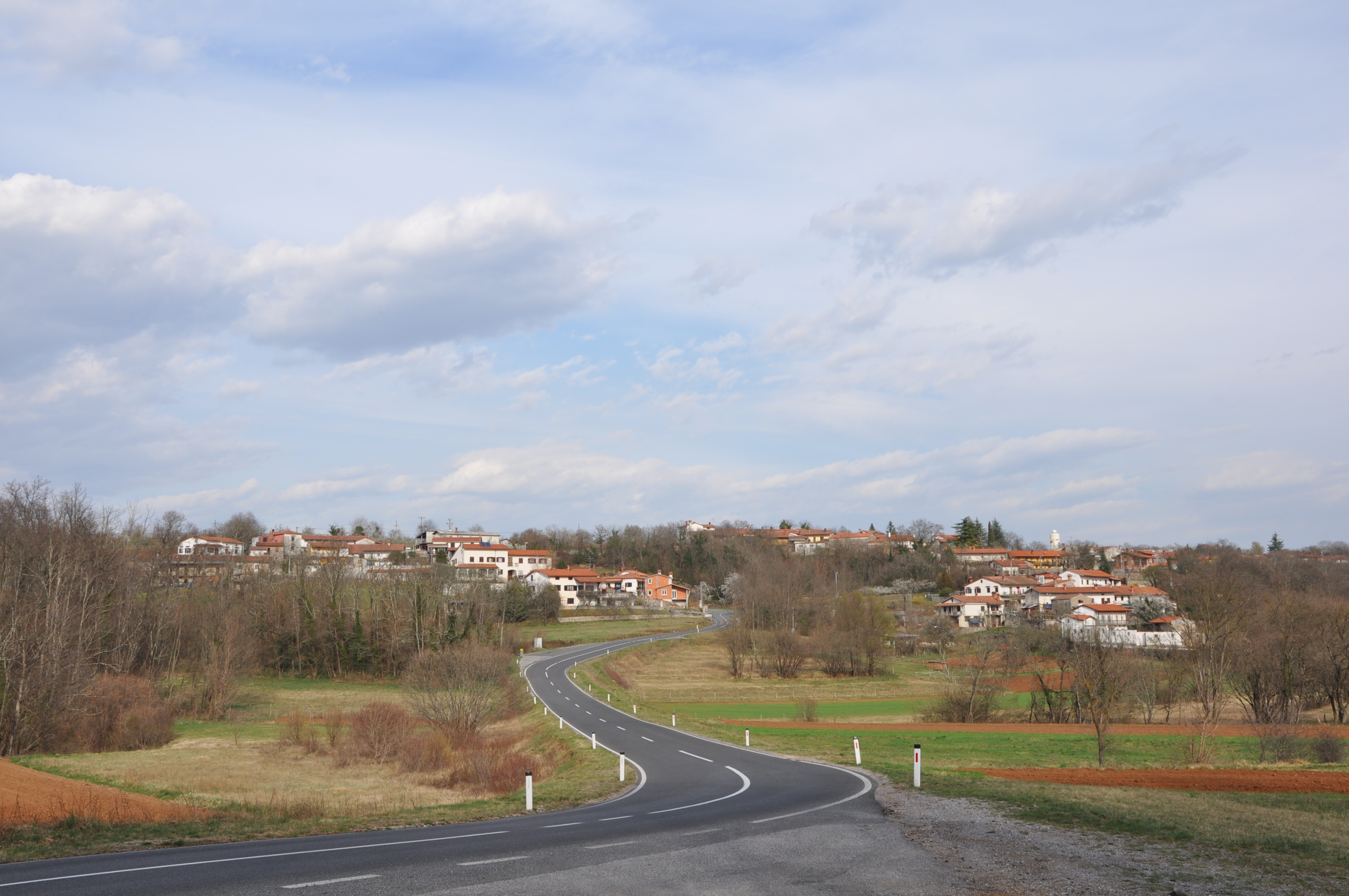

- Location in Slovenia
- Coordinates: 45°49′0.16″N 13°46′23.69″E
- Country: Slovenia
- Traditional region: Slovene Littoral
- Statistical region: Coastal–Karst
- Municipality: Komen

Area
  - Total: 4.21 km^{2} (1.63 sq mi)
- Elevation: 264.8 m (869 ft)

Population (2002)
  - Total: 160

Tomačevica (pronounced [tɔˈmaːtʃɛʋitsa]; Italian: Tomasevizza) is a village east of Komen in the Littoral region of Slovenia. According to the 2002 census, it has a population of 160.
