= Lukovec, Komen =

Lukovec Locavizza di San Daniele
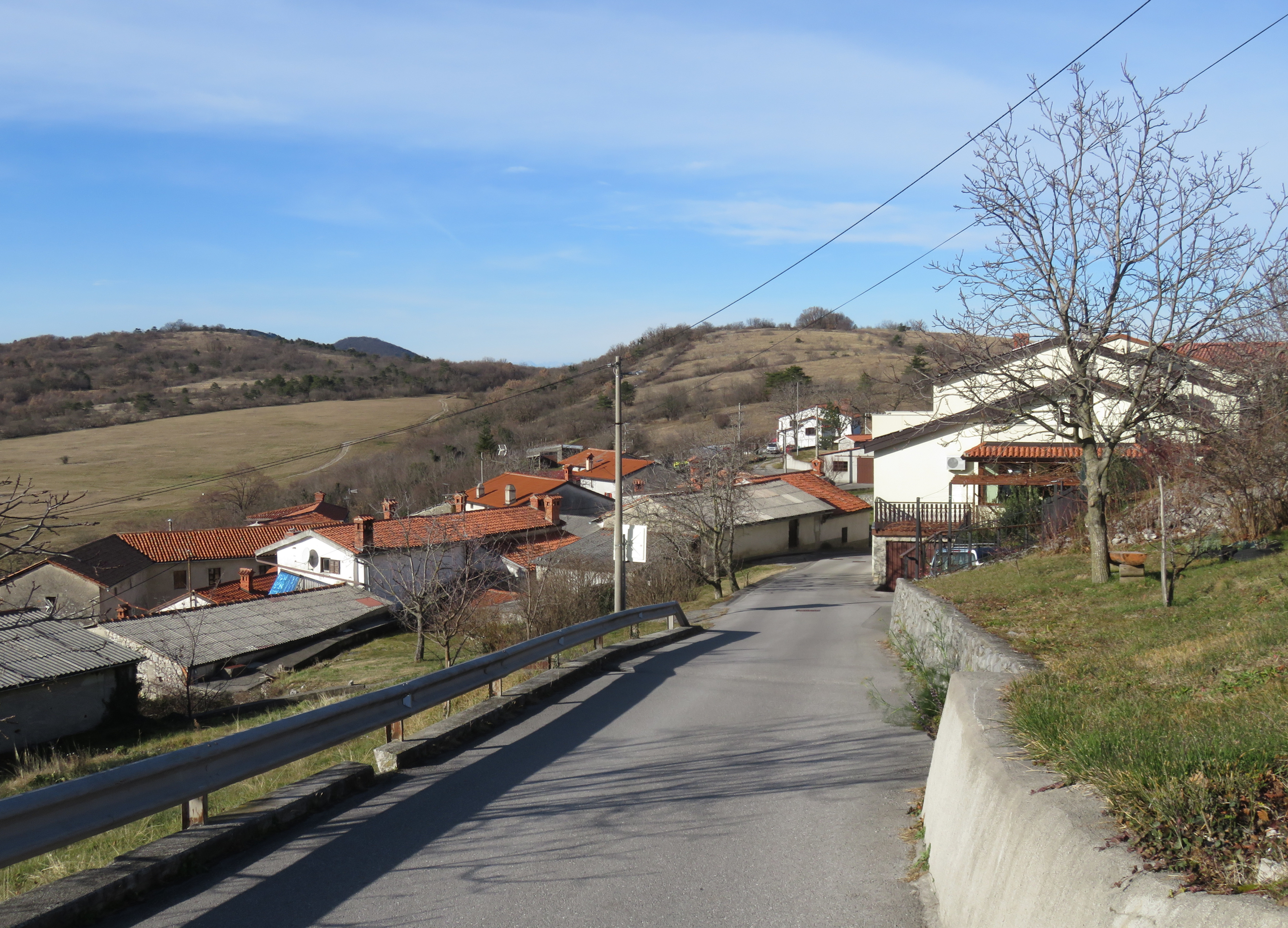

- Location in Slovenia
- Coordinates: 45°50′14.64″N 13°48′54.53″E
- Country: Slovenia
- Traditional region: Slovene Littoral
- Statistical region: Coastal–Karst
- Municipality: Komen

Area
  - Total: 1.19 km^{2} (0.46 sq mi)
- Elevation: 378.7 m (1,242 ft)

Population (2002)
  - Total: 48

Lukovec (pronounced [ˈluːkɔʋəts]; Italian: Locavizza di San Daniele) is a small village northwest of Štanjel in the Municipality of Komen in the Littoral region of Slovenia.

== Name ==
Lukovec was attested as Lucawicz in 1485. It was known as Locavizza di San Daniele in Italian.

== Cultural heritage ==
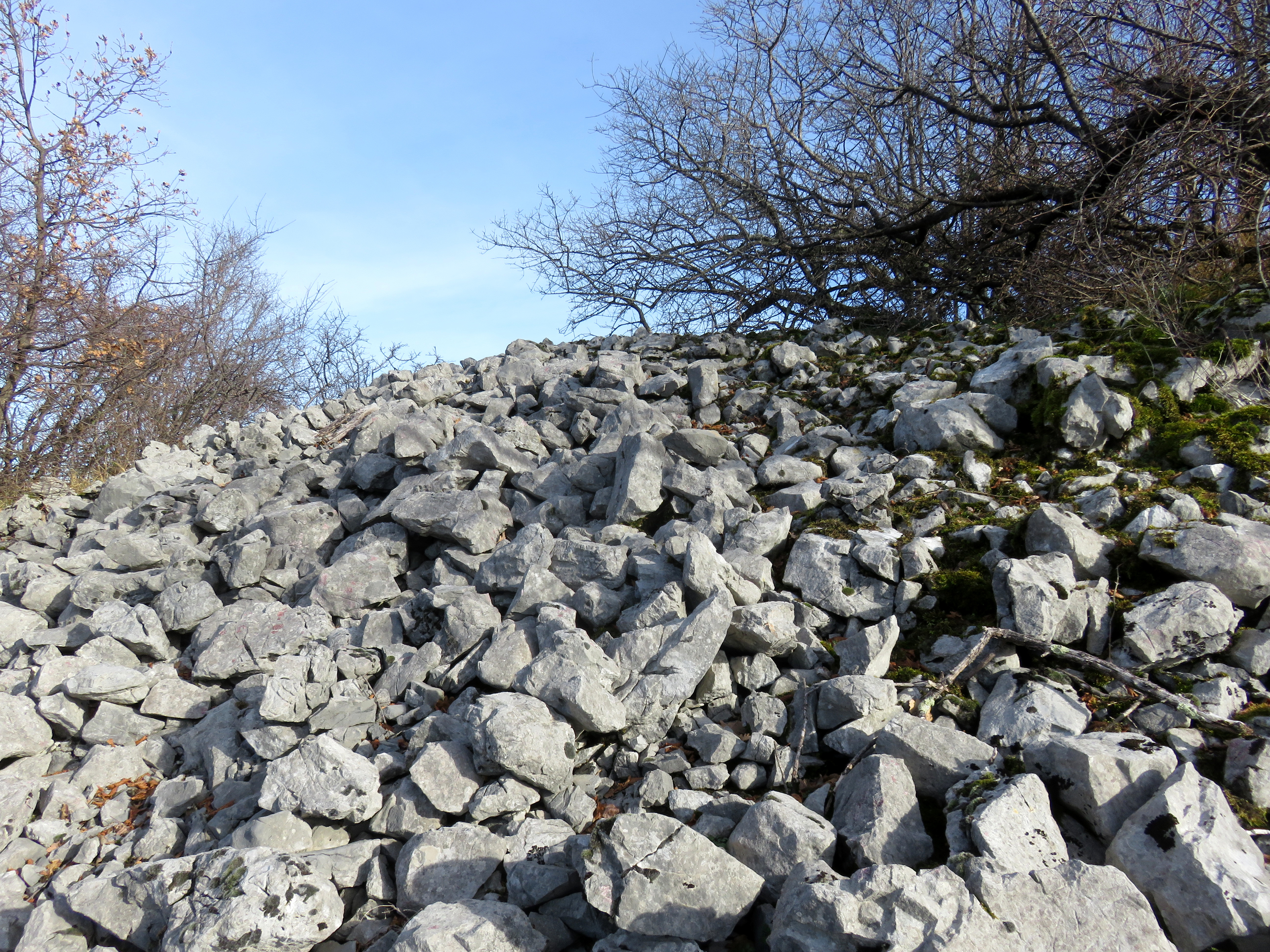
The Škratljevica Tumulus

The Škratljevica Tumulus (Slovene: Gomila Škratljevica) is located southeast of Lukovec, at an elevation known as Lukovec Škratljevica (Slovene: Lukovska Škratlevica, elevation 434 m or 1,424 ft). It is a large mound of stones dating from the Iron Age, and it is believed to cover the remnants of a defensive tower that was part of a series built along the northern Karst Rim.
