= Škofi =

Škofi Scoffi
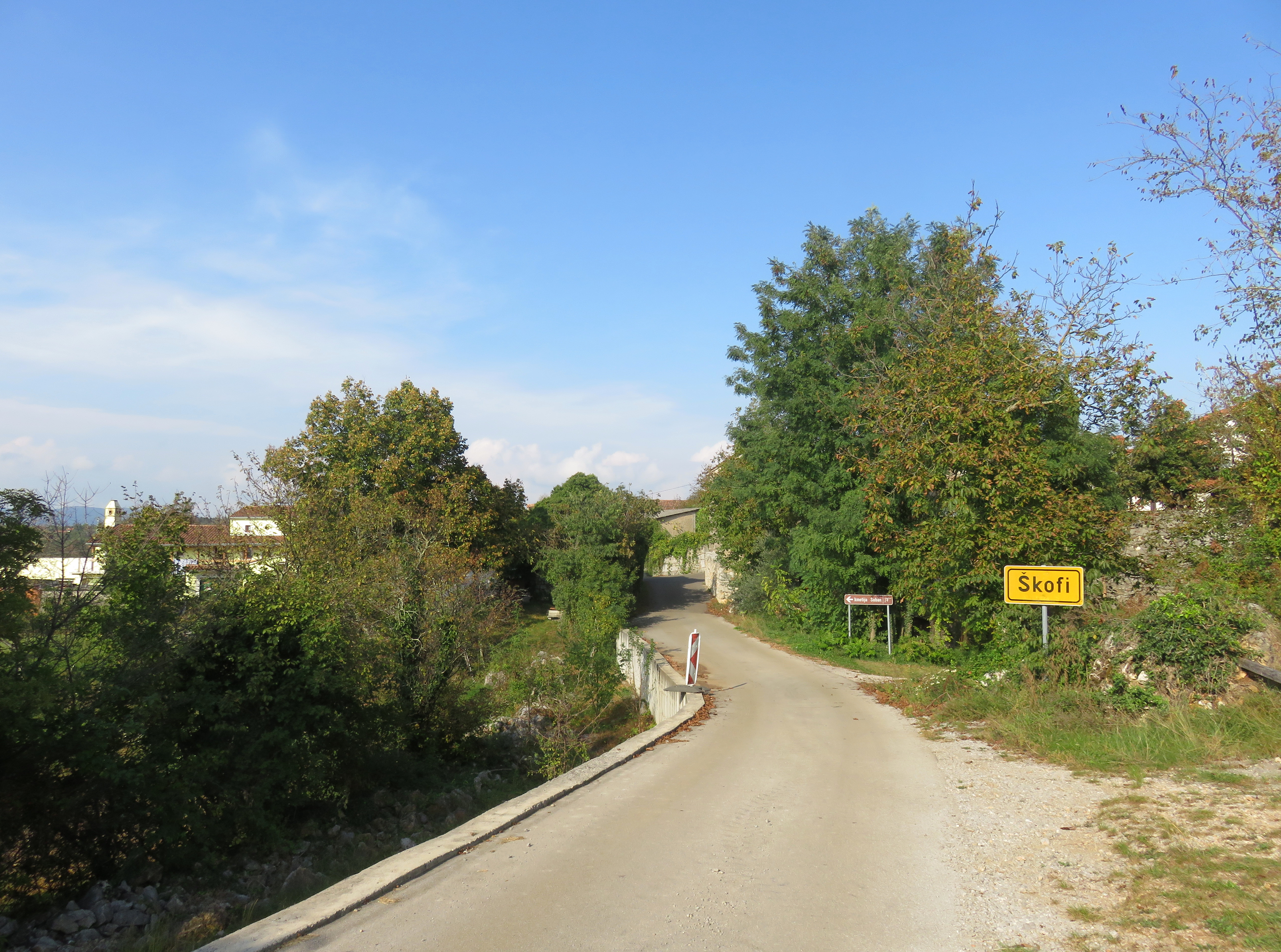

- Location in Slovenia
- Coordinates: 45°46′59.46″N 13°44′6.05″E
- Country: Slovenia
- Traditional region: Slovene Littoral
- Statistical region: Coastal–Karst
- Municipality: Komen

Area
  - Total: 0.83 km^{2} (0.32 sq mi)
- Elevation: 214.3 m (703 ft)

Population (2002)
  - Total: 7

Škofi (pronounced [ˈʃkoːfi]; Italian: Scoffi) is a small settlement southeast of Gorjansko in the Municipality of Komen in the Littoral region of Slovenia close to the border with Italy.
