= Nadrožica =

Nadrožica Villa Nadrosizza
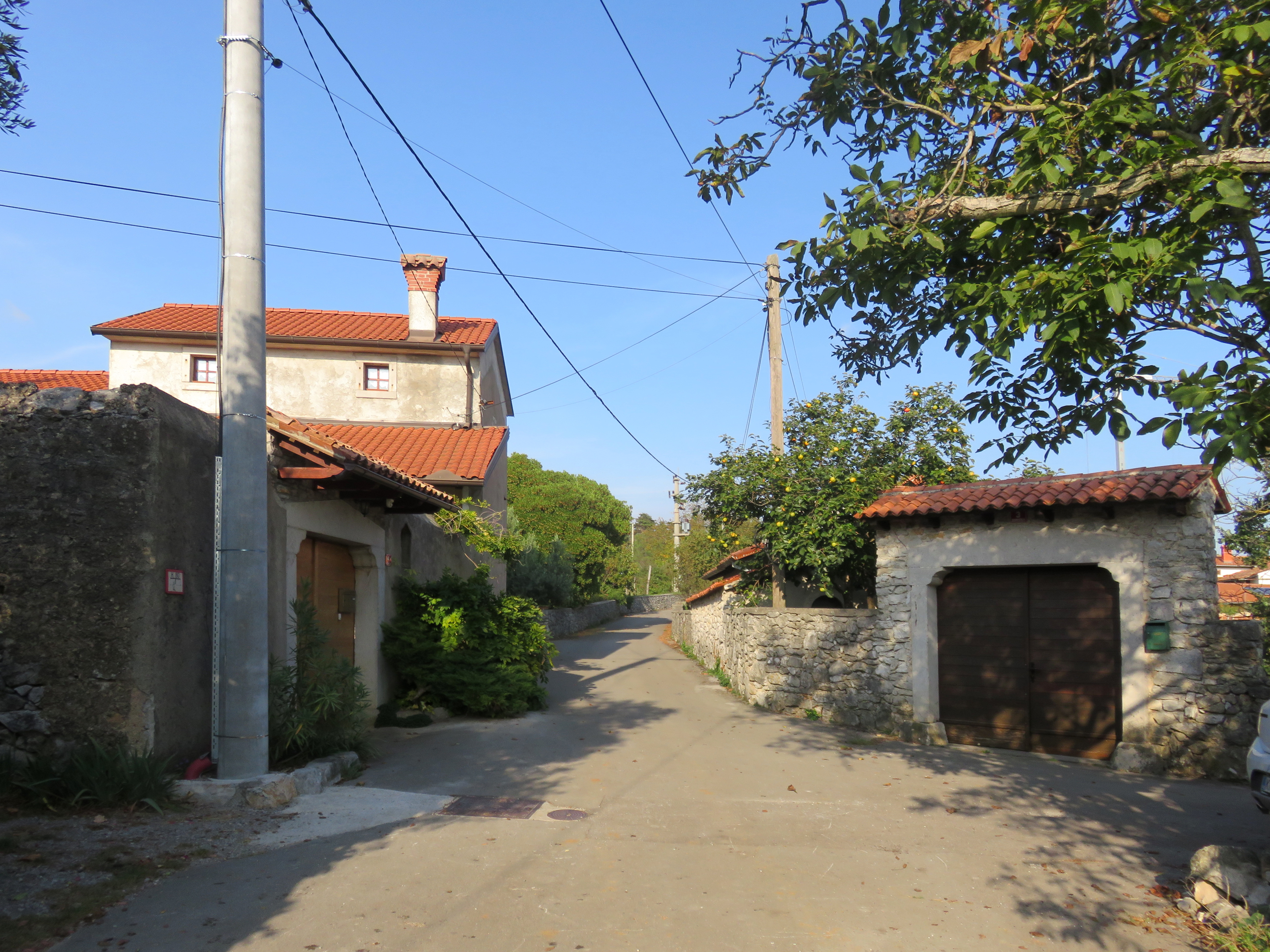

- Location in Slovenia
- Coordinates: 45°47′33.93″N 13°43′49.06″E
- Country: Slovenia
- Traditional region: Slovene Littoral
- Statistical region: Coastal–Karst
- Municipality: Komen

Area
  - Total: 1.78 km^{2} (0.69 sq mi)
- Elevation: 240.3 m (788 ft)

Population (2002)
  - Total: 8

Nadrožica (pronounced [ˈnaːdɾɔʒitsa]; Italian: Villa Nadrosizza) is a small settlement southeast of Gorjansko in the Municipality of Komen in the Littoral region of Slovenia next to the border with Italy.
