= Mali Dol, Komen =

Mali Dol Vallepiccola
- Location in Slovenia
- Coordinates: 45°49′35.74″N 13°46′18.28″E
- Country: Slovenia
- Traditional region: Slovene Littoral
- Statistical region: Coastal–Karst
- Municipality: Komen

Area
  - Total: 1.59 km^{2} (0.61 sq mi)
- Elevation: 233.3 m (765 ft)

Population (2002)
  - Total: 48

Mali Dol (pronounced [ˈmaːli ˈdoːu̯]; Italian: Vallepiccola) is a small settlement northeast of Komen in the Littoral region of Slovenia.
