= Čipnje =

Čipnje Cippi
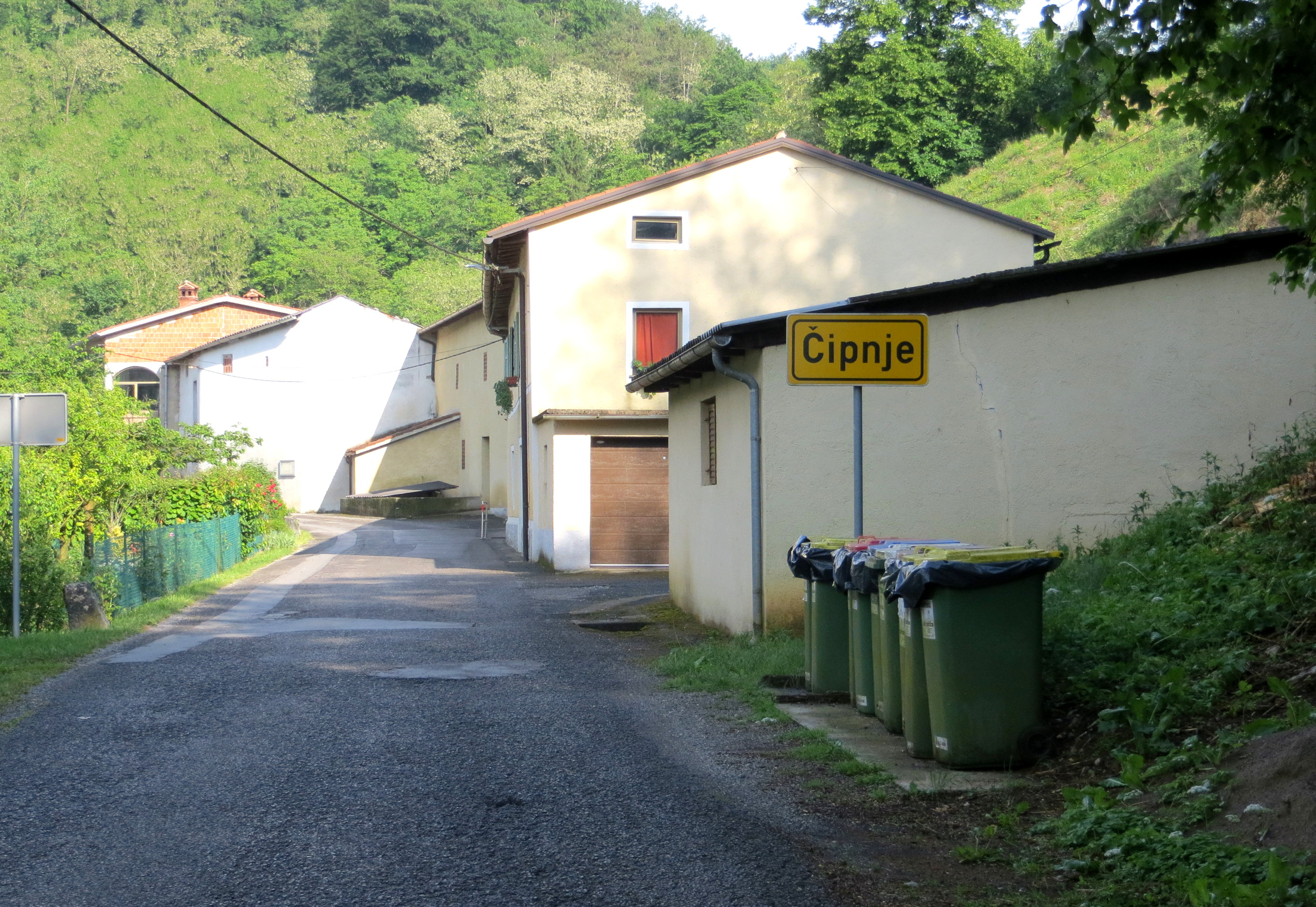

- Location in Slovenia
- Coordinates: 45°50′10.23″N 13°50′9.69″E
- Country: Slovenia
- Traditional region: Slovene Littoral
- Statistical region: Coastal–Karst
- Municipality: Komen

Area
  - Total: 0.22 km^{2} (0.085 sq mi)
- Elevation: 195.5 m (641 ft)

Population (2002)
  - Total: 16

Čipnje (pronounced [ˈtʃiːpnjɛ]; Italian: Cippi) is a small settlement north of Komen in the Littoral region of Slovenia.
