= Lisjaki =

Lisjaki Lissiachi
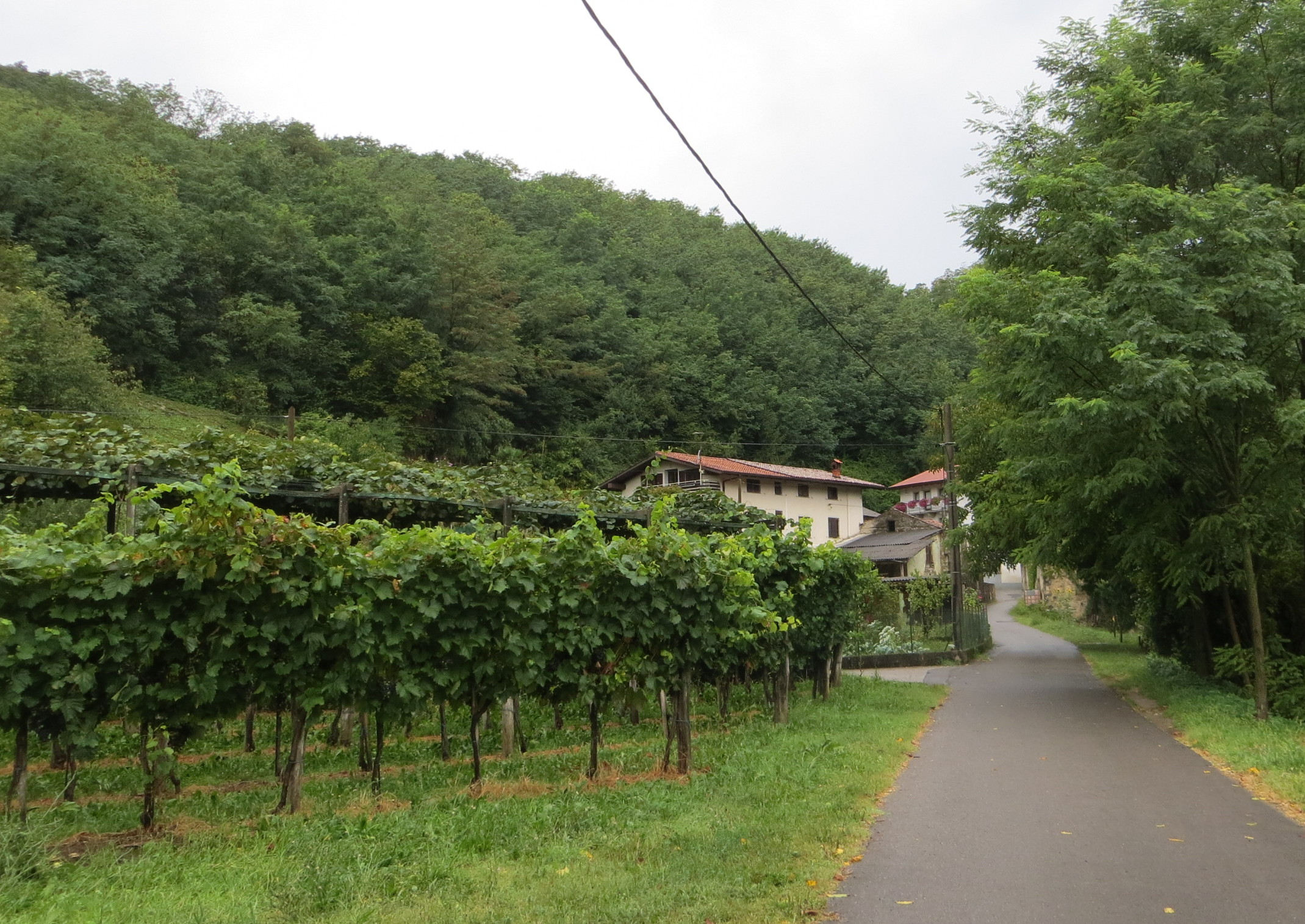

- Location in Slovenia
- Coordinates: 45°50′25.76″N 13°49′36.47″E
- Country: Slovenia
- Traditional region: Slovene Littoral
- Statistical region: Coastal–Karst
- Municipality: Komen

Area
  - Total: 0.49 km^{2} (0.19 sq mi)
- Elevation: 146.9 m (482 ft)

Population (2002)
  - Total: 50

Lisjaki (pronounced [liˈsjaːki]; Italian: Lissiachi) is a small village next to Spodnja Branica in the Littoral region of Slovenia. It lies within the Municipality of Komen.
