= Brje pri Komnu =

Brje pri Komnu Boriano
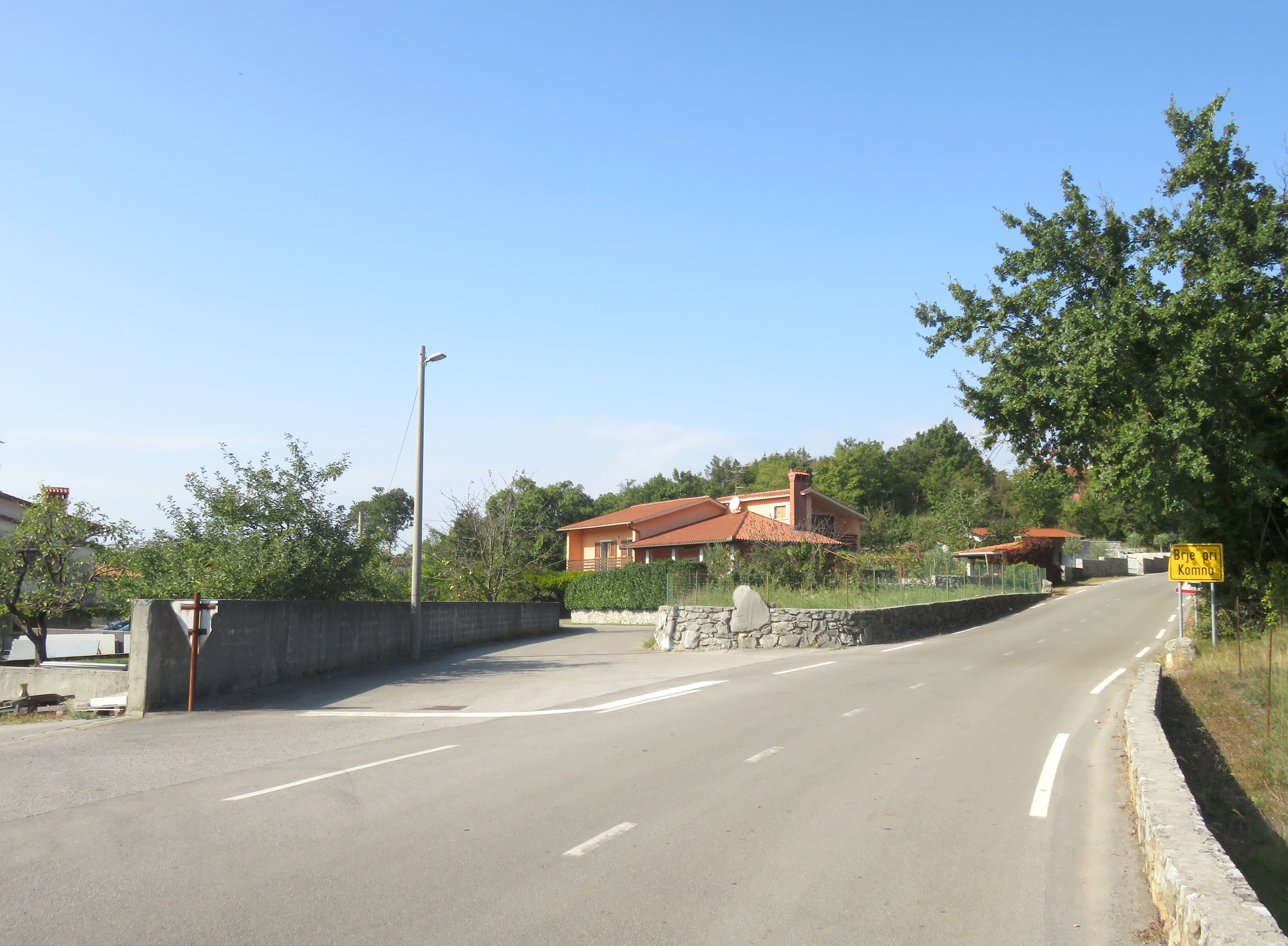

- Location in Slovenia
- Coordinates: 45°47′4.59″N 13°43′2.97″E
- Country: Slovenia
- Traditional region: Slovene Littoral
- Statistical region: Coastal–Karst
- Municipality: Komen

Area
  - Total: 2.04 km^{2} (0.79 sq mi)
- Elevation: 184.4 m (605 ft)

Population (2002)
  - Total: 97

Brje pri Komnu (pronounced [ˈbəɾjɛ pɾi ˈkoːmnu]; Italian: Boriano) is a village in the Municipality of Komen in the Littoral region of Slovenia next to the border with Italy.

== Cultural heritage ==
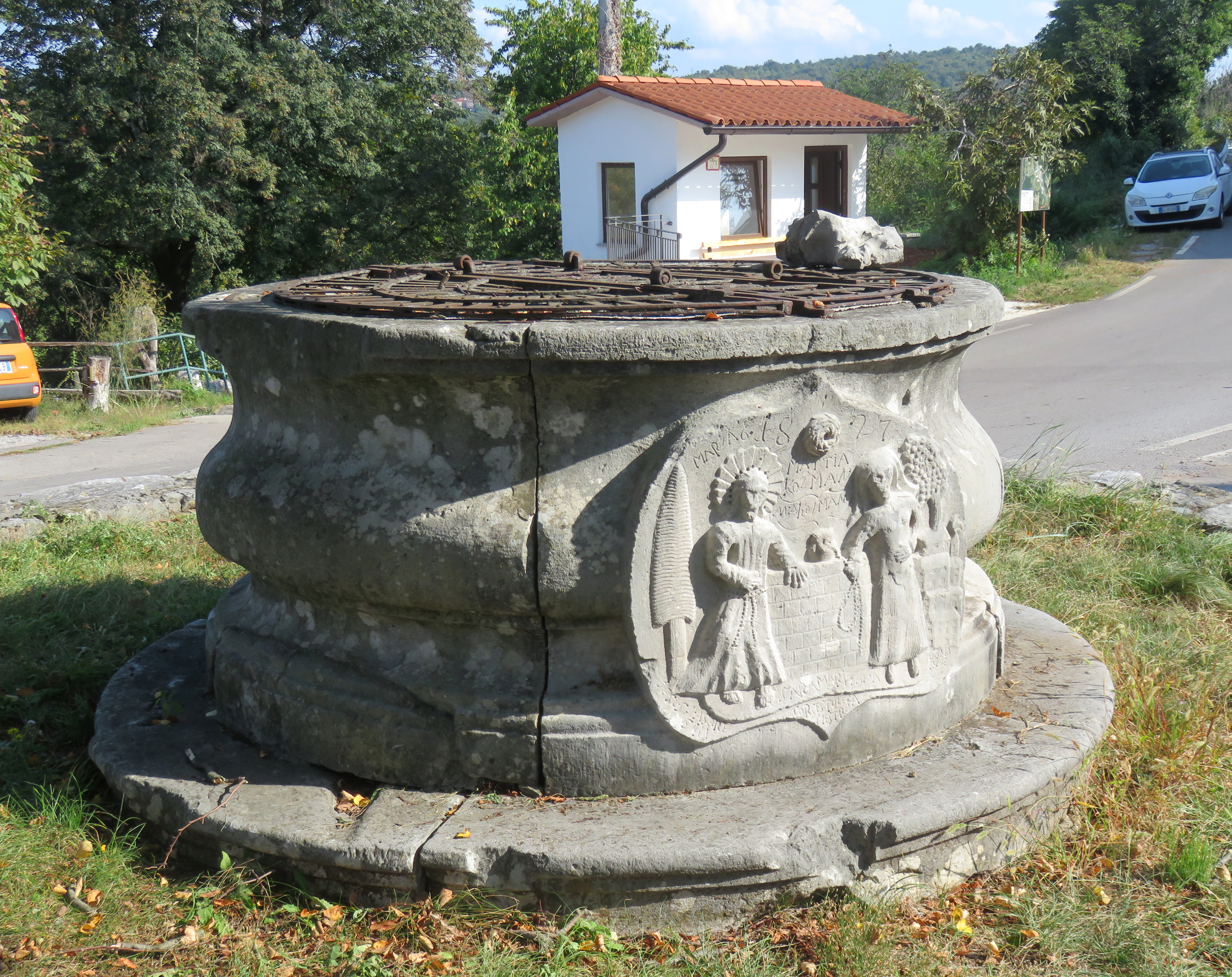
Village well

The village well in Brje pri Komnu is registered as cultural heritage. The wellhead is carved from stone in a bulging shape and stands on a round plinth. It is decorated with a relief depicting Jesus and the Samaritan woman that was carved by Mattia Kozman in 1827. The well is located on the main square in the village.
