= Preserje pri Komnu =

Preserje pri Komnu Pressèrie
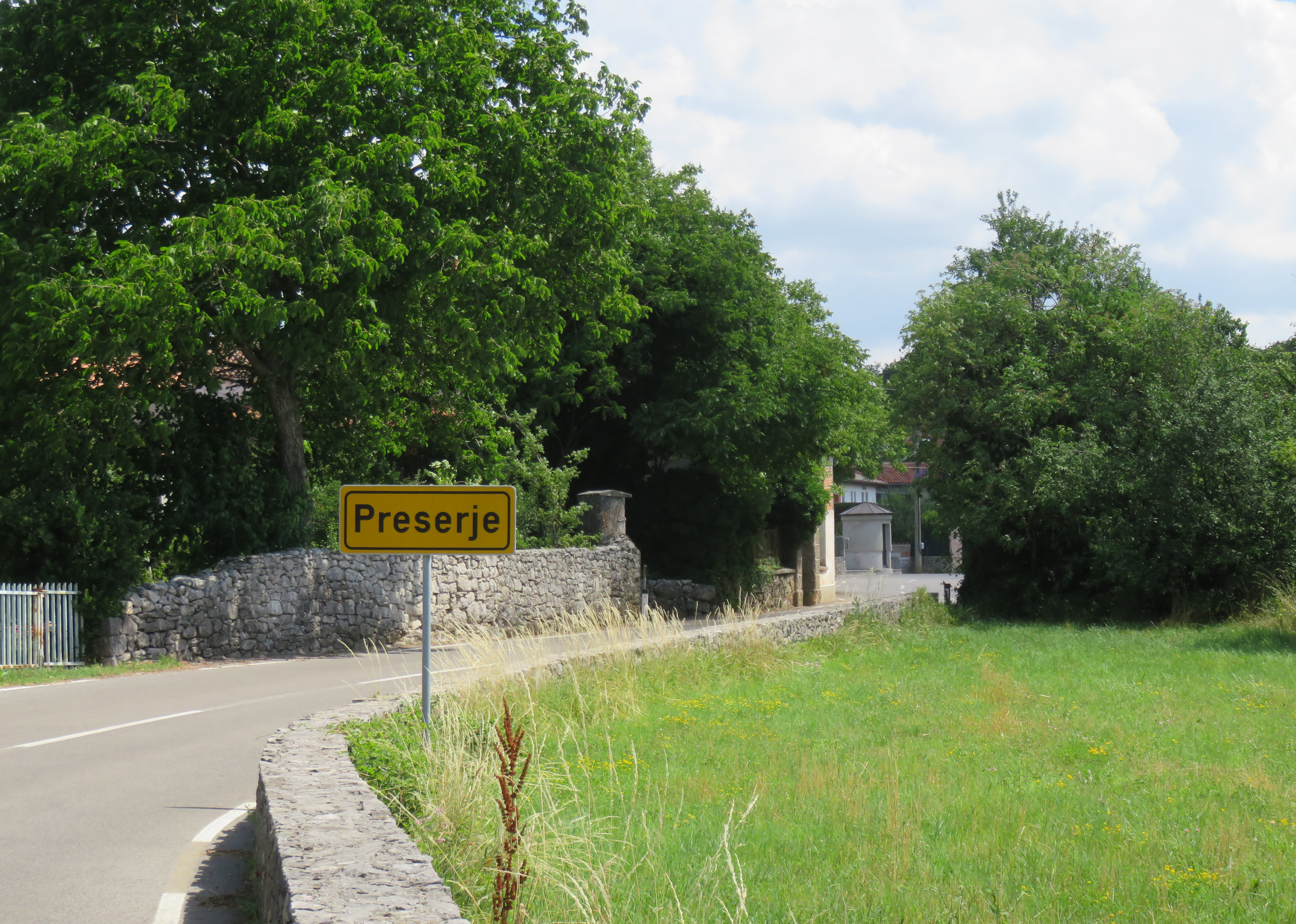

- Location in Slovenia
- Coordinates: 45°49′5.58″N 13°43′46.52″E
- Country: Slovenia
- Traditional region: Slovene Littoral
- Statistical region: Coastal–Karst
- Municipality: Komen

Area
  - Total: 0.80 km^{2} (0.31 sq mi)
- Elevation: 268.4 m (881 ft)

Population (2002)
  - Total: 48

Preserje pri Komnu (pronounced [ˈpɾeːsɛɾjɛ pɾi ˈkoːmnu]; Italian: Pressèrie) is a small settlement immediately west of Komen in the Littoral region of Slovenia.

== Name ==
The name of the settlement was changed from Preserje to Preserje pri Komnu in 1955.
