= Divči =

Divči Diuci
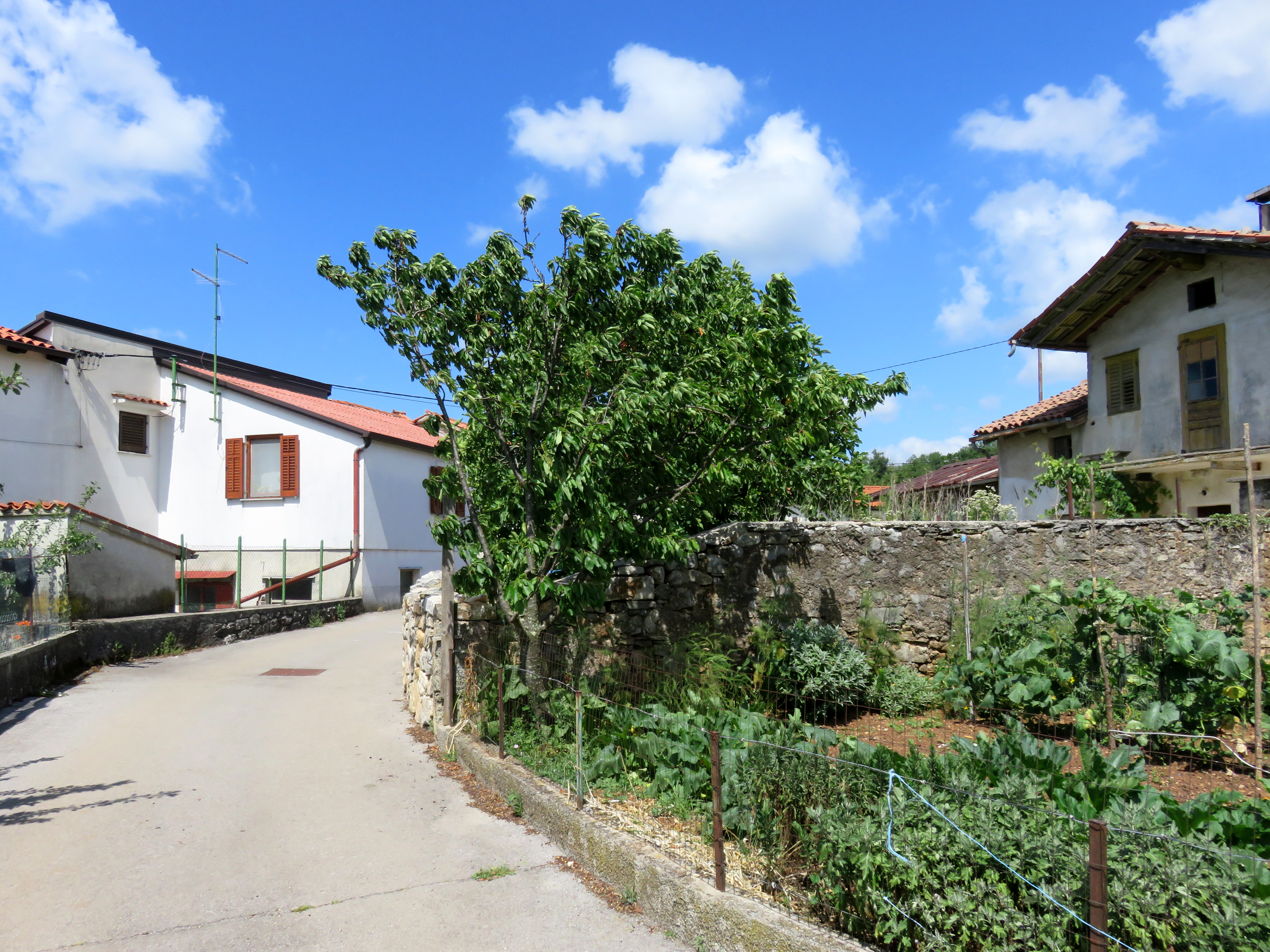

- Location in Slovenia
- Coordinates: 45°49′5.2″N 13°45′10.38″E
- Country: Slovenia
- Traditional region: Slovene Littoral
- Statistical region: Coastal–Karst
- Municipality: Komen

Area
  - Total: 0.26 km^{2} (0.10 sq mi)
- Elevation: 273.7 m (898 ft)

Population (2002)
  - Total: 36

Divči (pronounced [ˈdiːu̯tʃi]; Italian: Diuci) is a small settlement northeast of Komen in the Littoral region of Slovenia.
