= Koboli =

Koboli Cobolli
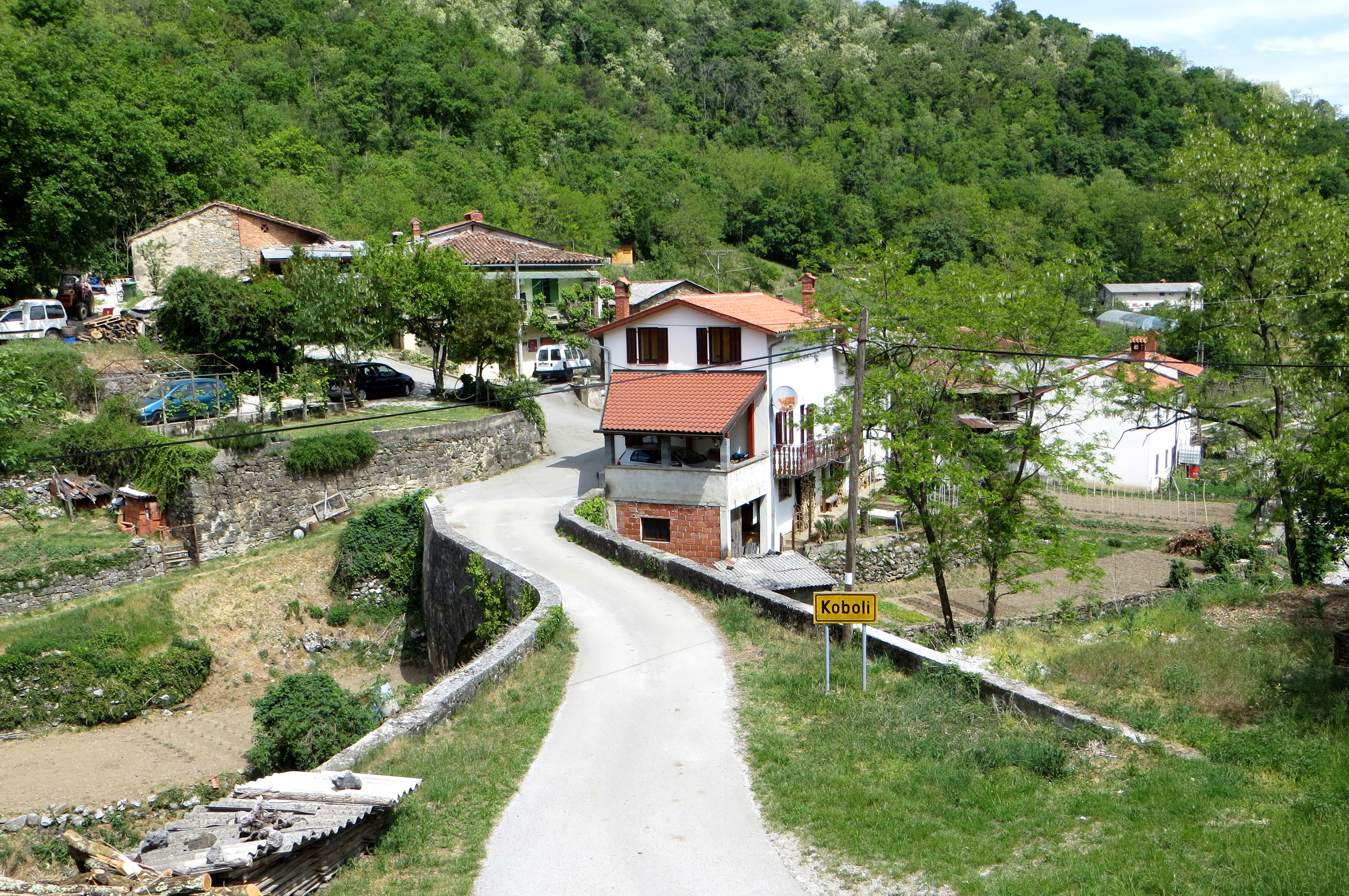

- Location in Slovenia
- Coordinates: 45°48′49.4″N 13°52′34.98″E
- Country: Slovenia
- Traditional region: Slovene Littoral
- Statistical region: Coastal–Karst
- Municipality: Komen

Area
  - Total: 0.97 km^{2} (0.37 sq mi)
- Elevation: 231.7 m (760 ft)

Population (2002)
  - Total: 20

Koboli (pronounced [kɔˈboːli]; Italian: Cobolli) is a small settlement southeast of Štanjel in the Municipality of Komen in the Littoral region of Slovenia next to the border with Italy.
