= Ivanji Grad =

Ivanji Grad Castelgiovanni
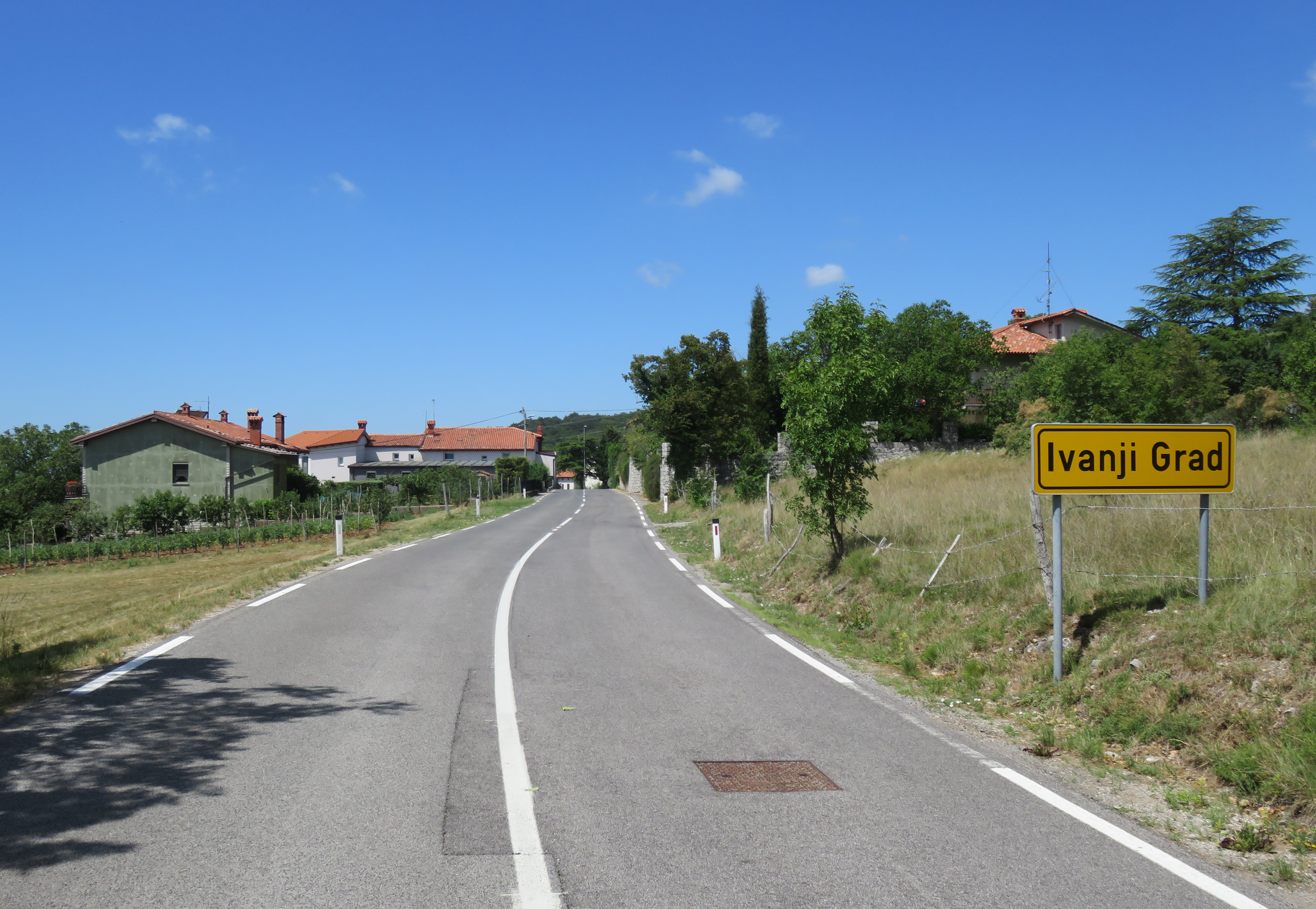

- Location in Slovenia
- Coordinates: 45°49′7.35″N 13°42′33.28″E
- Country: Slovenia
- Traditional region: Slovene Littoral
- Statistical region: Coastal–Karst
- Municipality: Komen

Area
  - Total: 3.26 km^{2} (1.26 sq mi)
- Elevation: 289.1 m (948 ft)

Population (2002)
  - Total: 82

Ivanji Grad (pronounced [iˈʋaːnji ˈɡɾaːt]; Italian: Castelgiovanni) is a village west of Komen in the Littoral region of Slovenia.

The small church in the settlement is dedicated to The Finding of the True Cross and belongs to the Parish of Komen.
