= Dolanci =

Dolanci Dolanzi
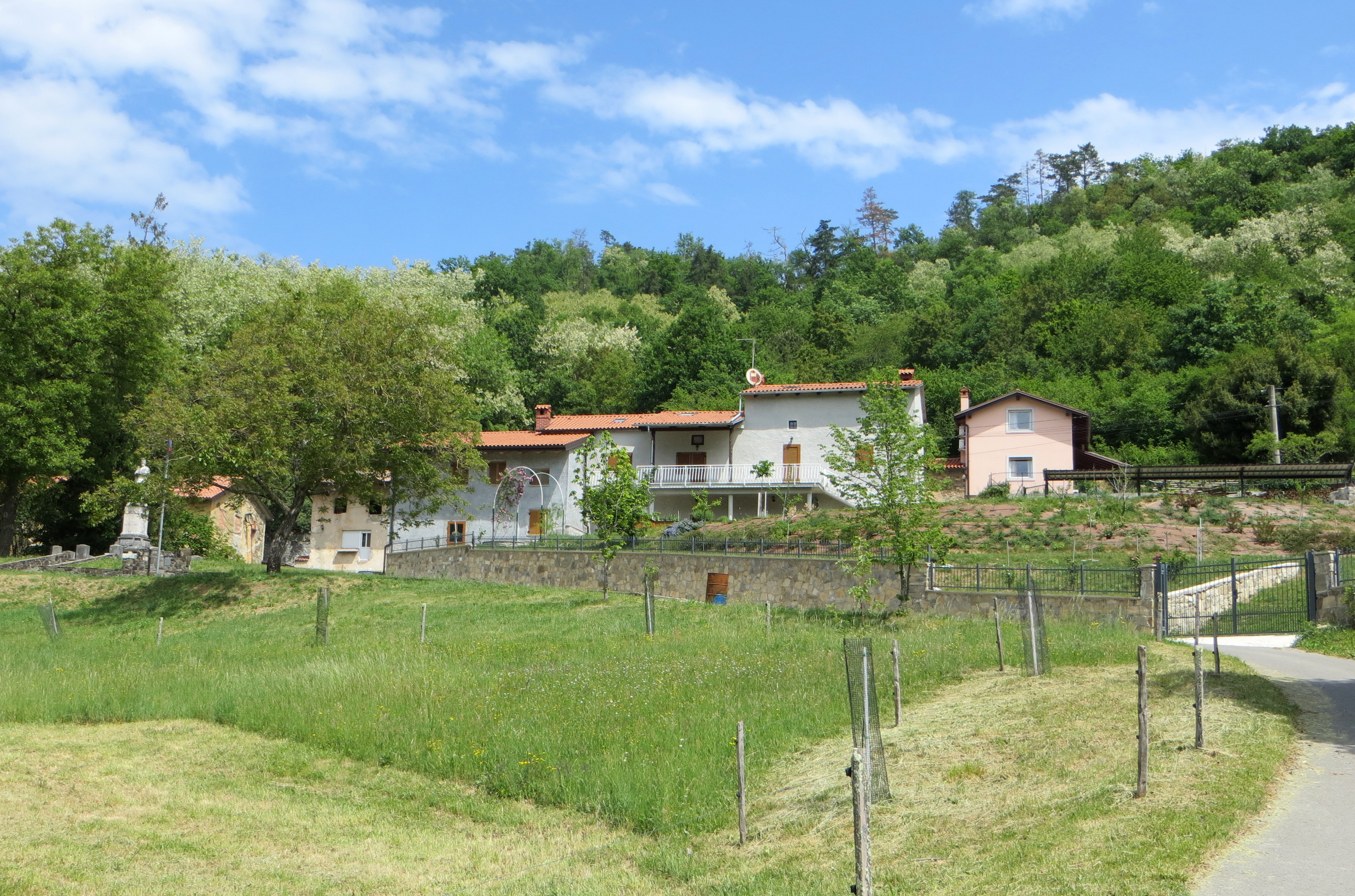

- Location in Slovenia
- Coordinates: 45°49′15″N 13°53′10″E
- Country: Slovenia
- Traditional region: Slovene Littoral
- Statistical region: Coastal–Karst
- Municipality: Komen

Area
  - Total: 0.95 km^{2} (0.37 sq mi)
- Elevation: 166.4 m (546 ft)

Population (2002)
  - Total: 18

Dolanci (pronounced [ˈdoːlantsi]; Italian: Dolanzi) is a small settlement east of Štanjel in the Municipality of Komen in the Littoral region of Slovenia.
