= Večkoti =

Večkoti Vescotti
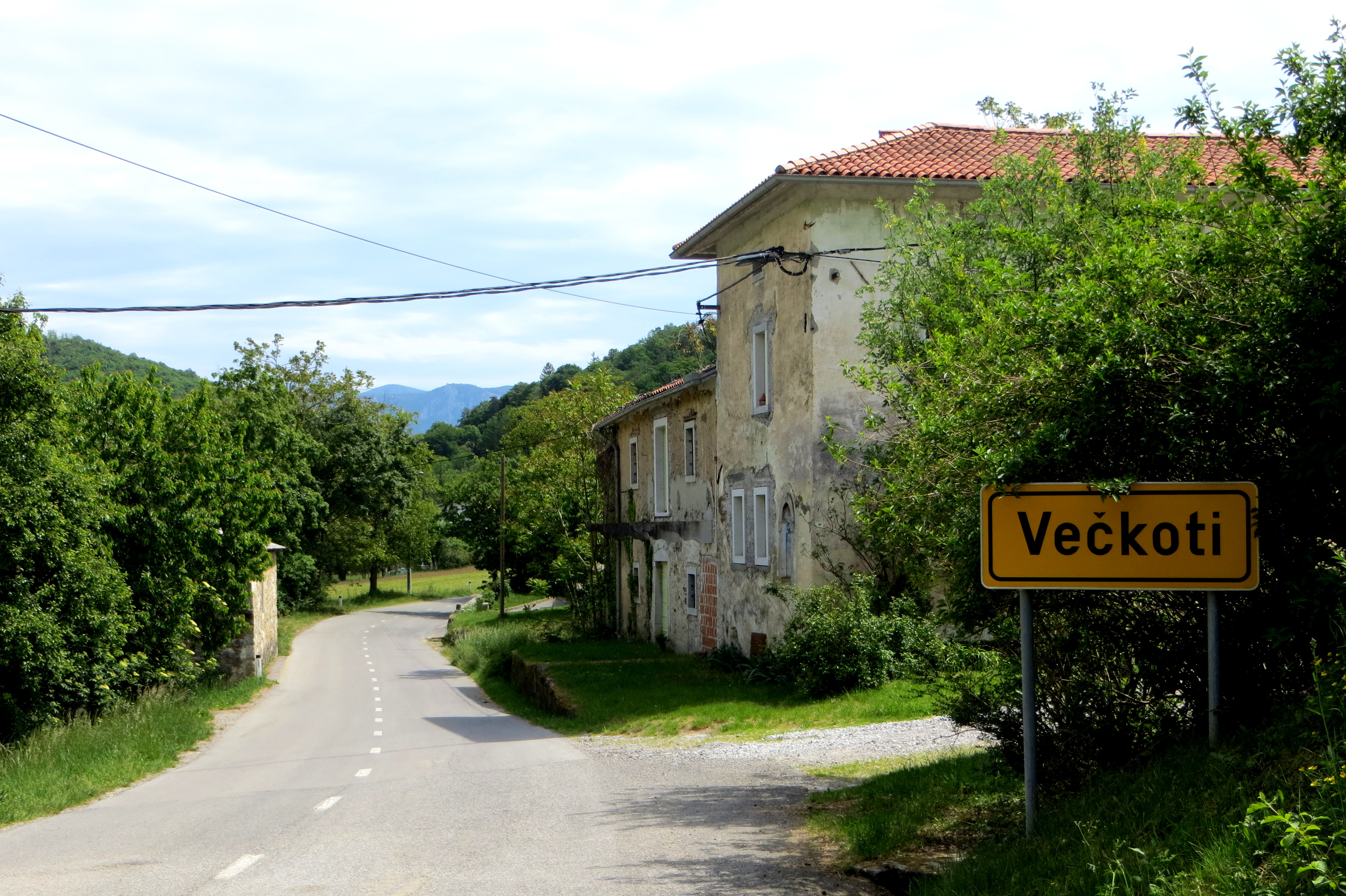

- Location in Slovenia
- Coordinates: 45°48′42.43″N 13°52′50.87″E
- Country: Slovenia
- Traditional region: Slovene Littoral
- Statistical region: Coastal–Karst
- Municipality: Komen

Area
  - Total: 0.32 km^{2} (0.12 sq mi)
- Elevation: 169 m (554 ft)

Population (2002)
  - Total: 8

Večkoti (pronounced [ʋɛtʃˈkoːti]; Italian: Vescotti) is a small settlement southeast of the village of Štanjel in the Municipality of Komen in the Littoral region of Slovenia.
