= Trebižani =

Trebižani Trevisani
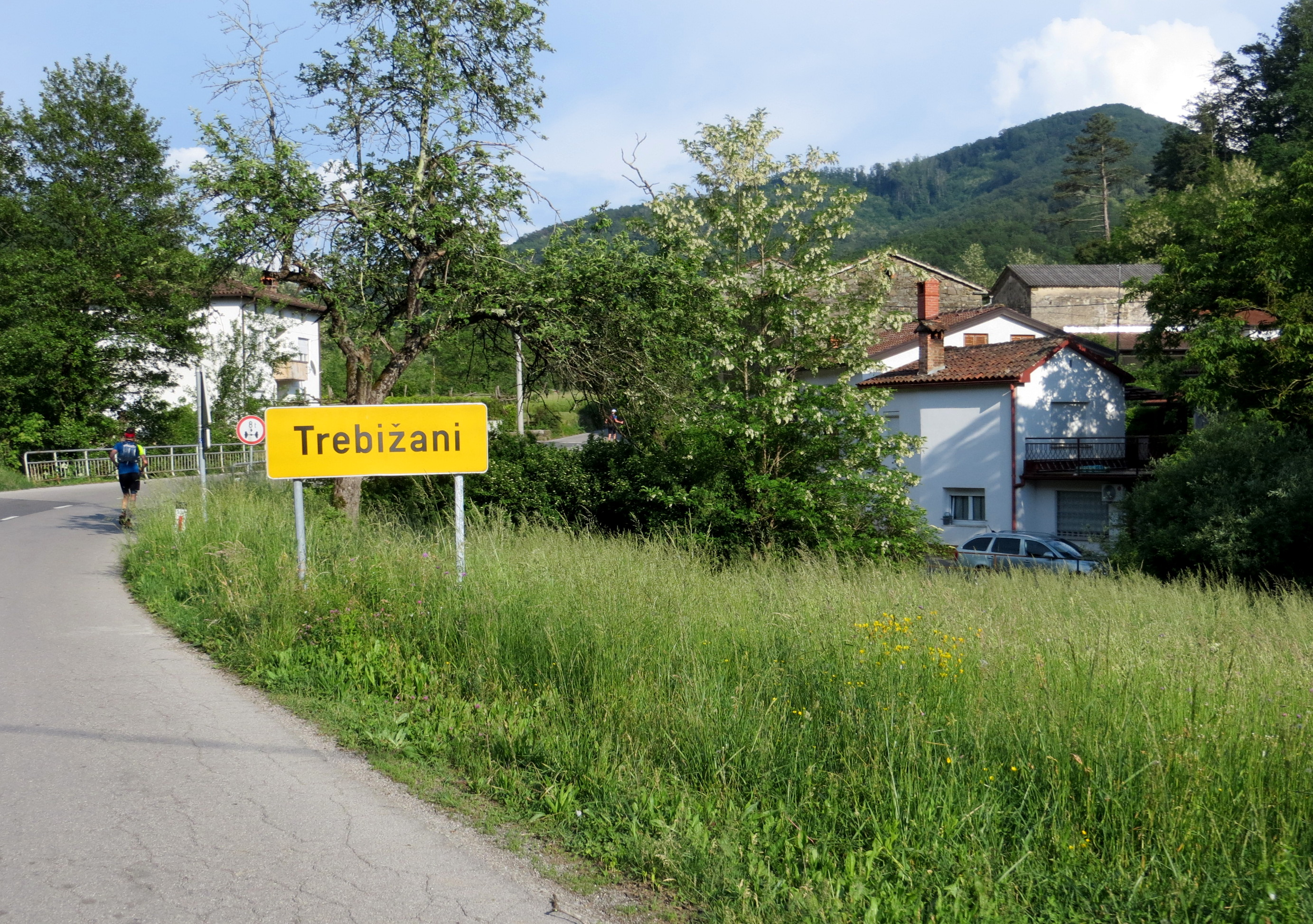

- Location in Slovenia
- Coordinates: 45°48′35.06″N 13°54′5.59″E
- Country: Slovenia
- Traditional region: Slovene Littoral
- Statistical region: Coastal–Karst
- Municipality: Komen

Area
  - Total: 0.87 km^{2} (0.34 sq mi)
- Elevation: 332.9 m (1,092 ft)

Population (2002)
  - Total: 14

Trebižani (pronounced [tɾɛbiˈʒaːni]) Italian: Trevisani) is a small village in the Municipality of Komen in the Littoral region of Slovenia.
