= Čehovini =

Čehovini Cecovini
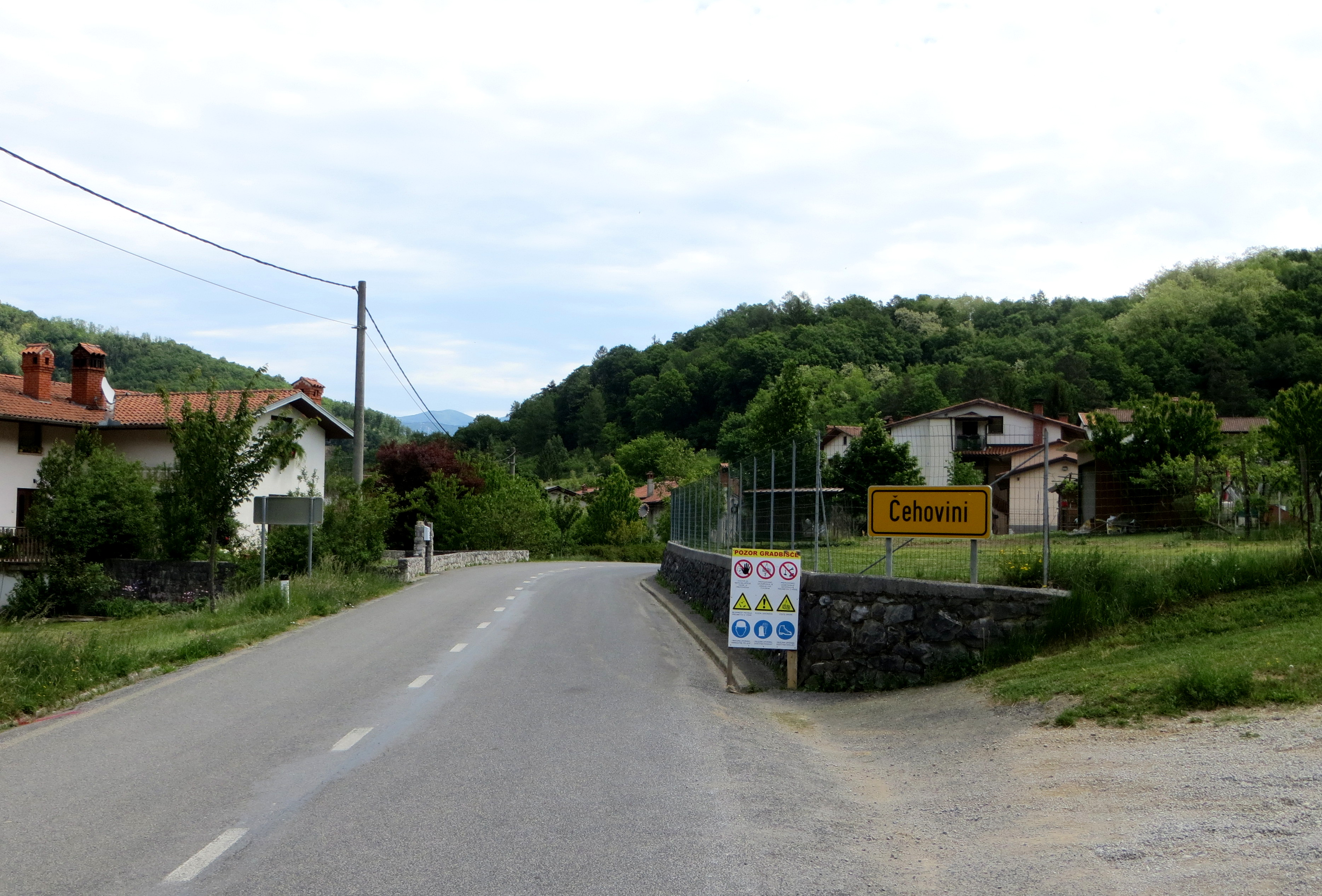

- Location in Slovenia
- Coordinates: 45°48′43.53″N 13°53′4.28″E
- Country: Slovenia
- Traditional region: Slovene Littoral
- Statistical region: Coastal–Karst
- Municipality: Komen

Area
  - Total: 0.81 km^{2} (0.31 sq mi)
- Elevation: 166.1 m (545 ft)

Population (2002)
  - Total: 61

Čehovini (pronounced [tʃɛxɔˈʋiːni]; Italian: Cecovini) is a small village southeast of Komen in the Littoral region of Slovenia.
