= Municipality of Komen =

Municipality of Slovenia

Municipality of Komen Občina Komen
- Municipality
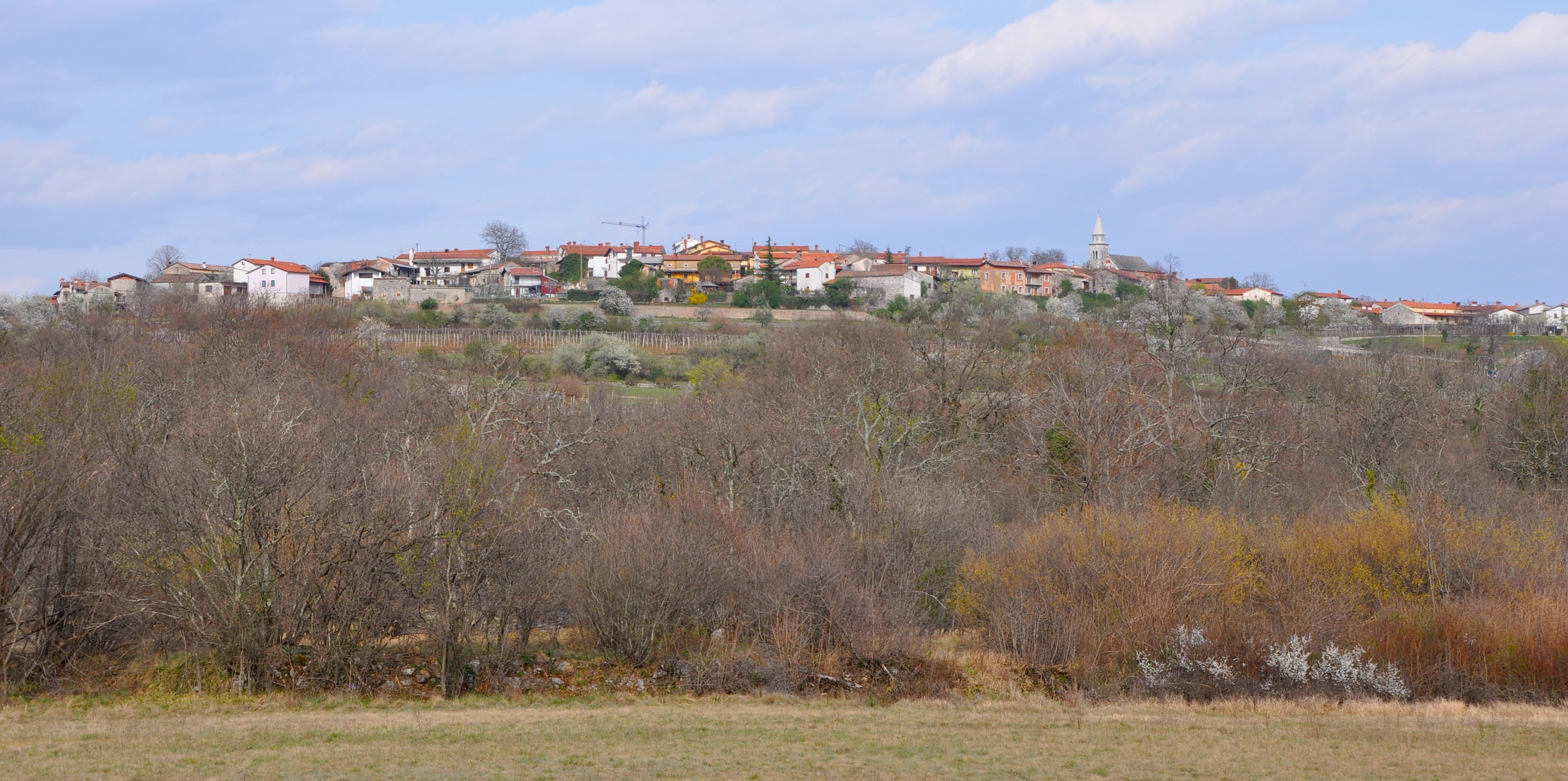

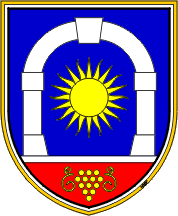
- Coat of arms

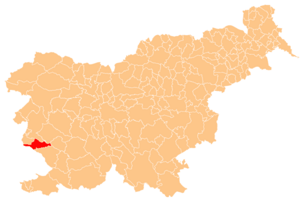
- Location of the Municipality of Komen in Slovenia
- Coordinates: 45°49′N 13°45′E
- Country: Slovenia

Government
  - Mayor: Erik Modic (Independent)

Area
  - Total: 102.7 km^{2} (39.7 sq mi)

Population (2021)
  - Total: 3,631
  - Density: 35.36/km^{2} (91.57/sq mi)
- Time zone: UTC+01 (CET)
  - Summer (DST): UTC+02 (CEST)
- Website: www.komen.si

The Municipality of Komen (pronounced [ˈkoːmən]; Slovene: Občina Komen) is a municipality in the Littoral region of Slovenia, near the Italian border. The seat of the municipality is the town of Komen. The municipality was established on 6 November 1994, when the former Municipality of Sežana was dissolved into four smaller municipalities (Divača, Hrpelje-Kozina, Komen, and Sežana). It borders Italy.

== Settlements ==
In addition to the municipal seat of Komen, the municipality also includes the following settlements:

- Brestovica pri Komnu
- Brje pri Komnu
- Čehovini
- Čipnje
- Coljava
- Divči
- Dolanci
- Gabrovica pri Komnu
- Gorjansko
- Hruševica
- Ivanji Grad
- Klanec pri Komnu
- Kobdilj
- Kobjeglava
- Koboli
- Kodreti
- Lisjaki
- Lukovec
- Mali Dol
- Nadrožica
- Preserje pri Komnu
- Rubije
- Šibelji
- Škofi
- Škrbina
- Štanjel
- Sveto
- Tomačevica
- Trebižani
- Tupelče
- Vale
- Večkoti
- Volčji Grad
- Zagrajec

== Notable people ==
Notable people that were born or lived in the municipality of Komen include:

- Max Fabiani, architect
- Franco Giraldi, Italian film director
- Anton Mahnič, theologian, activist, bishop of Krk
- Marjan Rožanc, writer and essayist
- Majda Širca, journalist and politician
