= Coastal–Karst Statistical Region =

Coordinates: 45°38′00″N 13°56′00″E

Coastal–Karst Statistical Region Obalno-kraška statistična regija Regione statistica Litorale-Carsica
- Statistical region
- Municipalities: 7
- Largest city: Koper

Area
  - Total: 1,044 km^{2} (403 sq mi)

Population (2020)
  - Total: 115,913
  - Density: 111.0/km^{2} (287.6/sq mi)

Statistics
  - Households: 46839
  - employed: 38404
  - Unemployed: 6056
  - College/university students: 3702
  - Regional GDP (2019): EUR 2,646 bn (EUR 22,894 per capita)
- HDI (2022): 0.928 very high · 2nd

The Coastal–Karst Statistical Region (Slovene: obalno-kraška statistična regija, Italian: Litorale-Carso) is a statistical region in southwest Slovenia. It covers the traditional and historical regions of Slovenian Istria and most of the Karst Plateau, which traditionally belonged to the County of Gorizia and Gradisca. The region has a sub-Mediterranean climate and is Slovenia's only statistical region bordering the sea. Its natural features enable the development of tourism, transport, and special agricultural crops. More than two-thirds of gross value added are generated by services (trade, accommodation, and transport); most was generated by activities at the Port of Koper and through seaside and spa tourism. The region recorded almost a quarter of all tourist nights in the country in 2013; slightly less than half by domestic tourists. Among foreign tourists, Italians, Austrians, and Germans predominated. In 2012 the region was one of four regions with a positive annual population growth rate (8.1‰). However, the age structure of the population was less favourable: in mid-2013 the ageing index was 133.3, which means that for every 100 inhabitants under 15 there were 133 inhabitants 65 or older. The farms in this region are among the smallest in Slovenia in terms of average utilised agricultural area per farm and in terms of the number of livestock on farms.

== Cities and towns ==
The Coastal–Karst Statistical Region includes four cities and towns, the largest of which is Koper.

Rank	Name	Population (2021)
1.	Koper	26,054
2.	Izola	11,819
3.	Sežana	6,172
4.	Piran	3,827

== Municipalities ==
The Coastal–Karst Statistical Region comprises the following eight municipalities:

- Ankaran
- Divača
- Hrpelje-Kozina
- Izola
- Komen
- Koper
- Piran
- Sežana

== Demographics ==
It has an area of 1,044 km^{2} and an estimated 112,942 inhabitants (at 1 July 2015)—of whom almost half live in the coastal city of Koper—and the second-highest GDP per capita of the Slovenian regions. It has high percentage of foreigners, at 10% (after the Central Slovenia Statistical Region with 33%, the Drava Statistical Region with 12.6%, and the Savinja Statistical Region with 12%).

== Economy ==
This region has the highest percentage of people employed in tertiary (services) activities. Employment structure: 77.8% services, 20.7% industry, 1.5% agriculture.

37.1% of the GDP is generated by transport, trade and catering business. 19.6% of all tourists visit this region, most of them from abroad (62.5%).

== Transportation ==
- Length of motorways: 83.6 km
- Length of other roads: 1551.6 km
- Also railways.

It has the largest and only commercial port situated in Koper along with marinas in Koper, Izola and Portorož. There is also a small international airport.

== Sources ==
- Slovenian regions in figures 2014
