= Čičarija dialect =

Dialect of Slovene

The Čičarija dialect (čiško narečje, čički dialekt) is a Slovene dialect in the Littoral dialect group. It is spoken in a few villages in Slovenian Istria near the Croatian border in the Čičarija region in the villages of Skadanščina, Golac, Obrov, Podbeže, Podgrad, Poljane, Račice and Starod. By number of speakers, it is one of the smallest Slovene dialects.

== Phonological and morphological characteristics ==
The Čičarija dialect is a mixed Slovenian–Croatian Central Chakavian dialect. It has been influenced by the Inner Carniolan dialect and has linguistic features indicating that it did not develop in the area, but was introduced through new settlement.
