= Artviže =

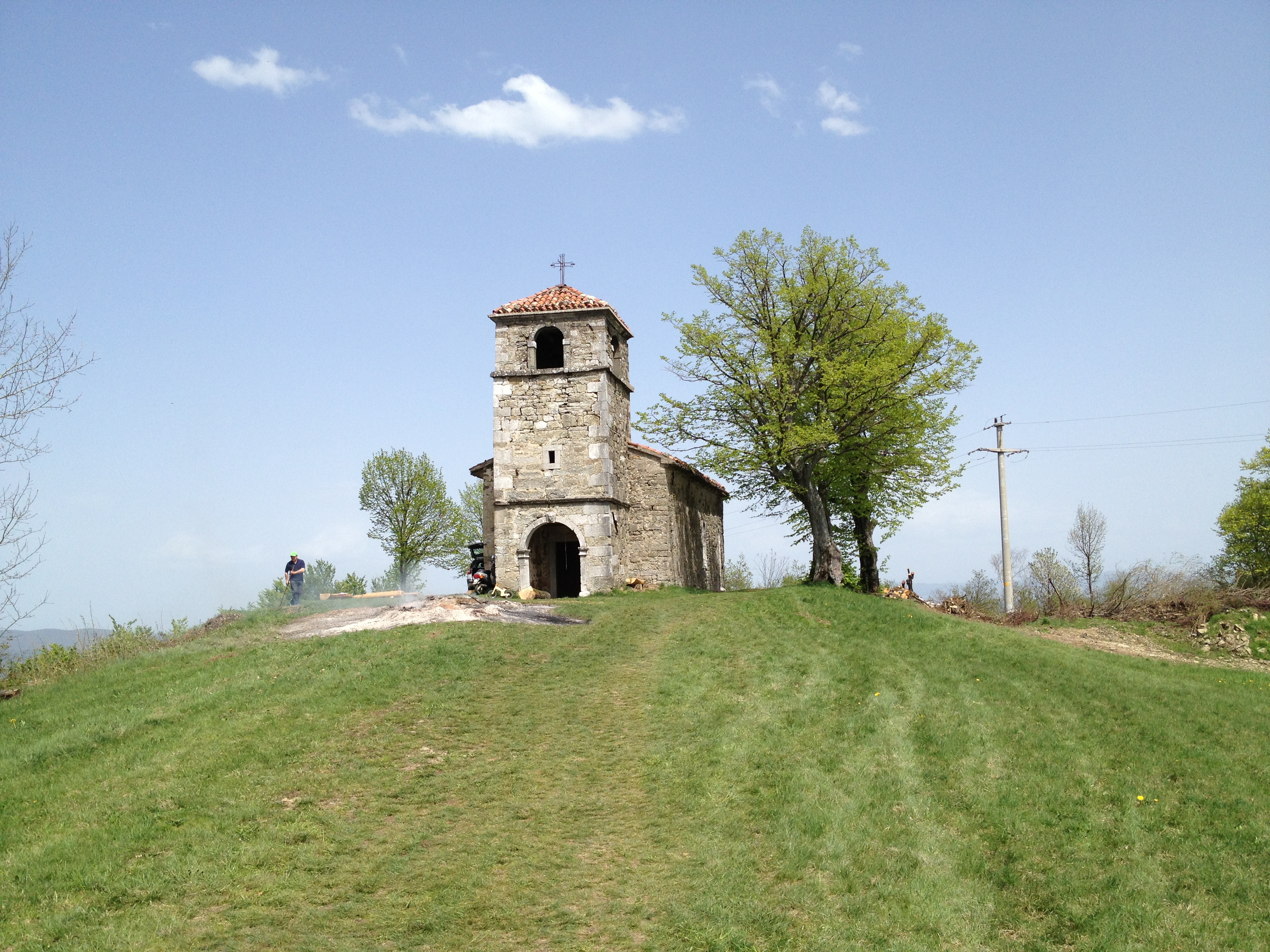

- Location in Slovenia
- Coordinates: 45°36′45.84″N 14°1′37.48″E
- Country: Slovenia
- Traditional region: Littoral
- Statistical region: Coastal–Karst
- Municipality: Hrpelje-Kozina

Area
  - Total: 2.98 km^{2} (1.15 sq mi)
- Elevation: 786.9 m (2,582 ft)

Population (2002)
  - Total: 54

Artviže (pronounced [aɾˈtʋiːʒɛ]; Italian: Artuise) is a small village in the Municipality of Hrpelje-Kozina in the Littoral region of Slovenia.

== Name ==
Artviže was attested in written sources in 1443 as Hertwisekh. The name is derived from the Middle High German personal name Hartwig via a denominal adjective form.

== Church ==
The church in the settlement is dedicated to the local saint, Saint Servulus, who lived in a cave close to Socerb, and belongs to the Parish of Brezovica.
