= Slope, Hrpelje-Kozina =

Slope
- Location in Slovenia
- Coordinates: 45°36′47.84″N 13°59′15.28″E
- Country: Slovenia
- Traditional region: Littoral
- Statistical region: Coastal–Karst
- Municipality: Hrpelje-Kozina

Area
  - Total: 4.95 km^{2} (1.91 sq mi)
- Elevation: 620.8 m (2,037 ft)

Population (2002)
  - Total: 69

Slope (pronounced [ˈsloːpɛ]) is a village east of Hrpelje in the Municipality of Hrpelje-Kozina in the Littoral region of Slovenia close to the border with Croatia.

== Church ==
The local church is dedicated to the Feast of the Cross and belongs to the Parish of Brezovica.

== Mass grave ==
Slope is the site of a mass grave associated with the Second World War. The Kotar Enclosure Cave Mass Grave (Slovene: Grobišče Jama pod Kotarjevo ogrado) is located in a woods northeast of Tublje pri Hrpeljah. It contains the remains of 15 to 17 people, probably German soldiers and Slovene civilians.
