= Velike Loče =

- Village
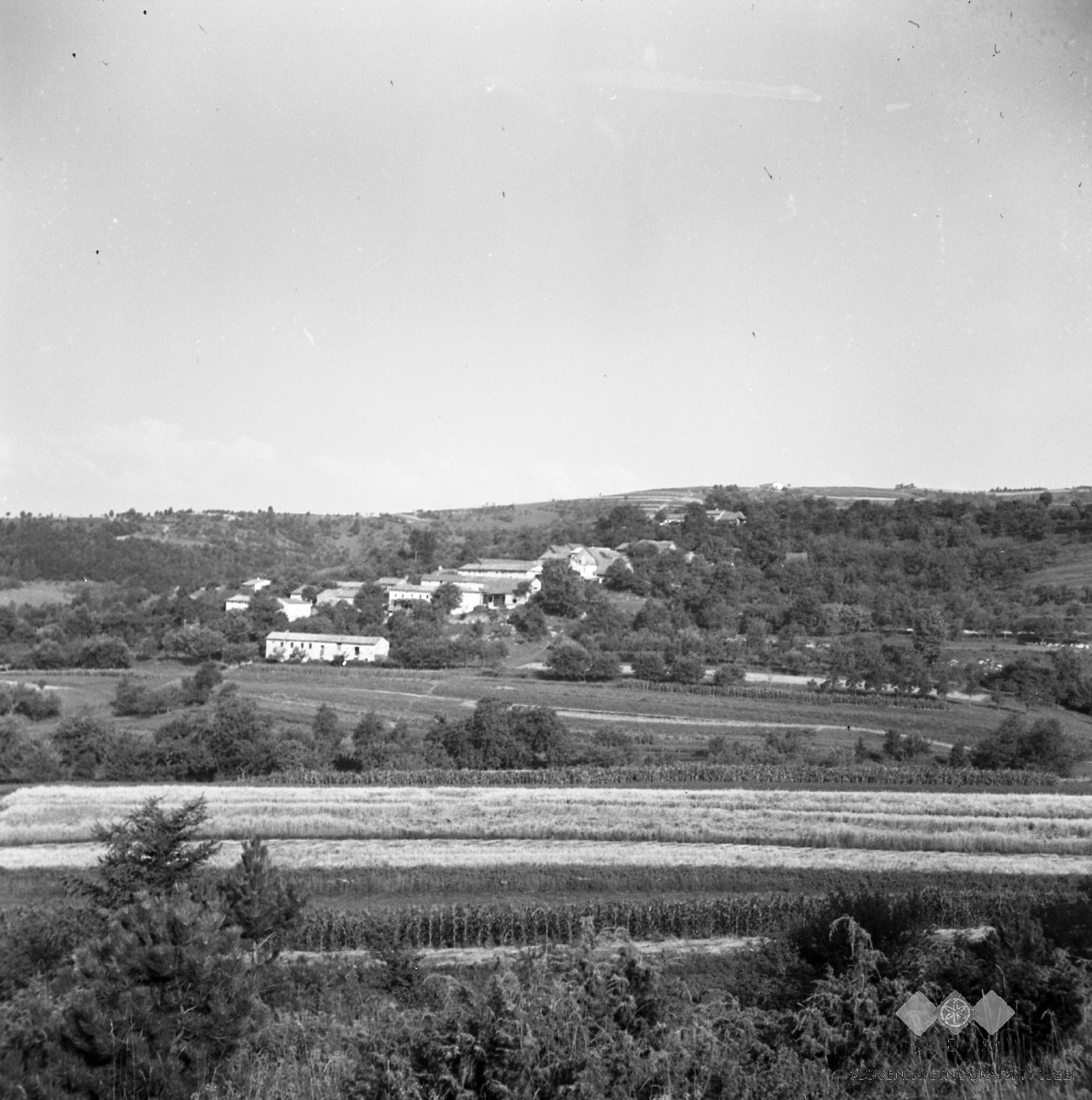
- Velike Loče in 1955

- Location in Slovenia
- Coordinates: 45°33′59.91″N 14°3′25.95″E
- Country: Slovenia
- Traditional region: Littoral
- Statistical region: Coastal–Karst
- Municipality: Hrpelje-Kozina

Area
  - Total: 2.06 km^{2} (0.80 sq mi)
- Elevation: 548.6 m (1,800 ft)

Population (2002)
  - Total: 42

Velike Loče (pronounced [ˈʋeːlikɛ ˈloːtʃɛ]; Italian: Loce Grande) is a small village above Markovščina in the Municipality of Hrpelje-Kozina in the Littoral region of Slovenia.
