= Socerb =

Socerb San Servolo
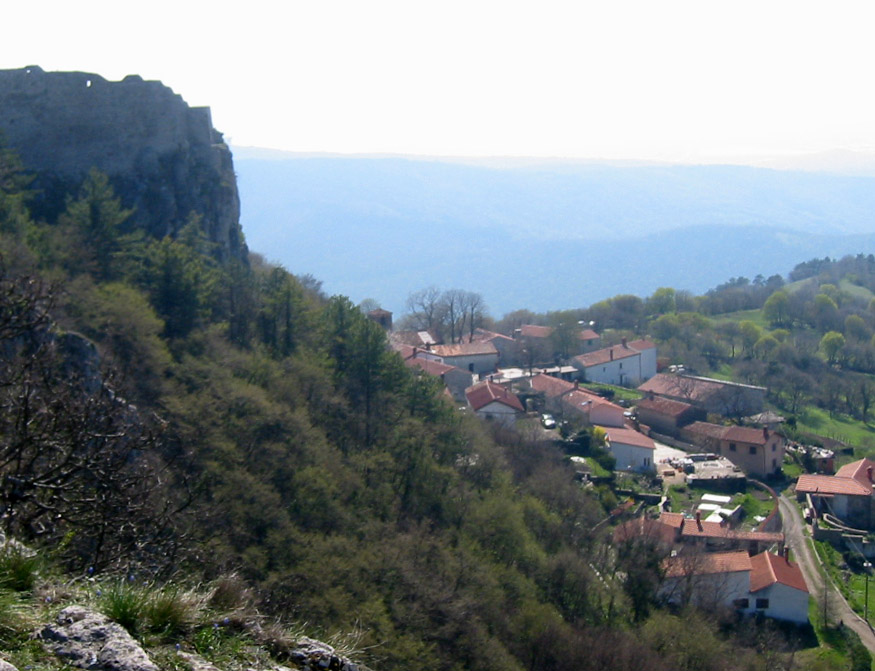

- Location in Slovenia
- Coordinates: 45°35′18.92″N 13°51′30.88″E
- Country: Slovenia
- Traditional region: Littoral
- Statistical region: Coastal–Karst
- Municipality: Koper

Area
  - Total: 3.66 km^{2} (1.41 sq mi)
- Elevation: 370.9 m (1,217 ft)

Population (2002)
  - Total: 19

Socerb (pronounced [sɔˈtsɛːɾp] or [ˈsoːtsɛɾp]; in older sources also Sacerb, Italian: San Servolo) is a village in the City Municipality of Koper in the Littoral region of Slovenia. It lies on the border with Italy and is dominated by the ruins of Socerb Castle, built on a rocky cliff above the village.

== Name ==
Socerb was attested in written sources in the 14th century as propre Sanctum Servulum (and in 1763–87 as St. Servolo). The Slovene name is derived from *Sǫt-Serb: a combination of *sǫt- 'saint' (ultimately from Latin sanctus) plus *Serb (from Servu(lus), the name of a local saint, or from Servus, a 5th-century martyr in Thuburbo Majus).

== History ==
Following the end of the Second World War, Socerb became part of Free Territory of Trieste. It was ceded to Yugoslavia along with several other villages in Muggia in 1954.

=== Mass graves ===
Socerb is the site of two known mass graves associated with the Second World War. The Socerb Cave behind Vrh Mass Grave (Slovene: Grobišče Socerbska jama za Vrhom) is located in the woods northeast of the village of Kastelec. The floor of the cave is covered with the remains of victims brought from Trieste and its surroundings and murdered here. The Cave 2 above Socerb Slope Mass Grave (Grobišče Jama 2 nad socerbskim klancem) is a shaft in Cesarjevič Common east of Socerb. The fenced entrance to the shaft is in an area sparsely covered in pine. The grave contains the remains of an unknown number of victims. The remains of two victims that were taken from the cave in 1992 were buried in the Koper cemetery in 2004.

== Church ==
The church in the settlement is dedicated to Saint Servulus, a local saint that lived in a nearby cave that is also a shrine, known as Holy Cave (Slovene: Sveta jama). There is little reliable information about the saint; his feast day is celebrated on 23 December and he is said to have been a lame beggar from Rome that collected alms around Saint Clement's Church and praised God. The church belongs to the Parish of Klanec.

== Gallery ==
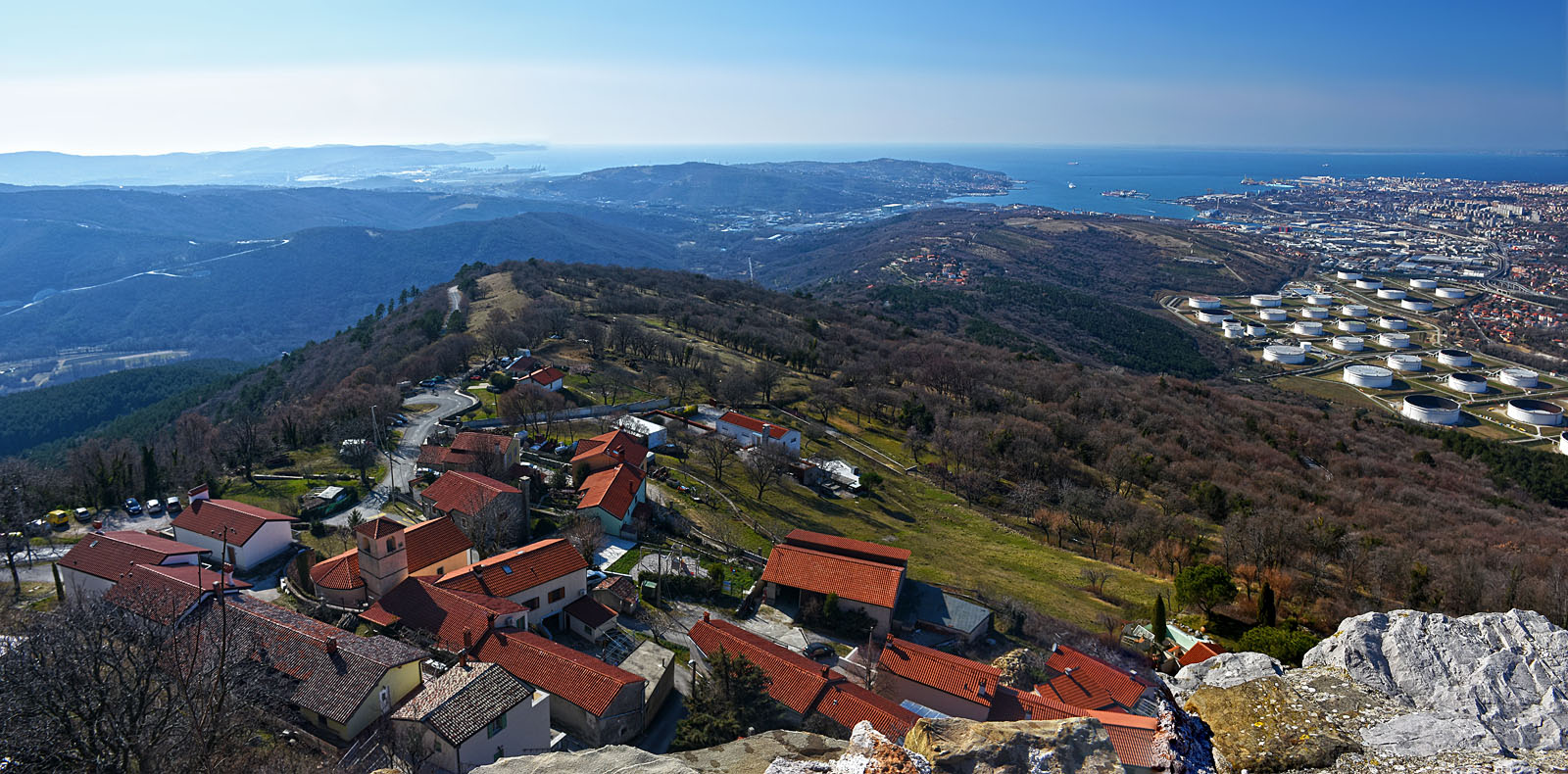
Socerb, seen from the castle
