= Nasirec =

- Location in Slovenia
- Coordinates: 45°36′53.43″N 13°54′41.91″E
- Country: Slovenia
- Traditional region: Littoral
- Statistical region: Coastal–Karst
- Municipality: Hrpelje-Kozina

Area
  - Total: 2.04 km^{2} (0.79 sq mi)
- Elevation: 489.5 m (1,606 ft)

Population (2002)
  - Total: 66

Nasirec (pronounced [naˈsiːɾəts]) is a settlement in the Municipality of Hrpelje-Kozina in the Littoral region of Slovenia. It lies on the road from Kozina towards the border with Italy.

The local church is dedicated to the Holy Trinity and belongs to the Parish of Draga.
