= Odolina =

- Location in Slovenia
- Coordinates: 45°35′11.94″N 14°1′4.96″E
- Country: Slovenia
- Traditional region: Littoral
- Statistical region: Coastal–Karst
- Municipality: Hrpelje-Kozina

Area
  - Total: 5.04 km^{2} (1.95 sq mi)
- Elevation: 505.6 m (1,659 ft)

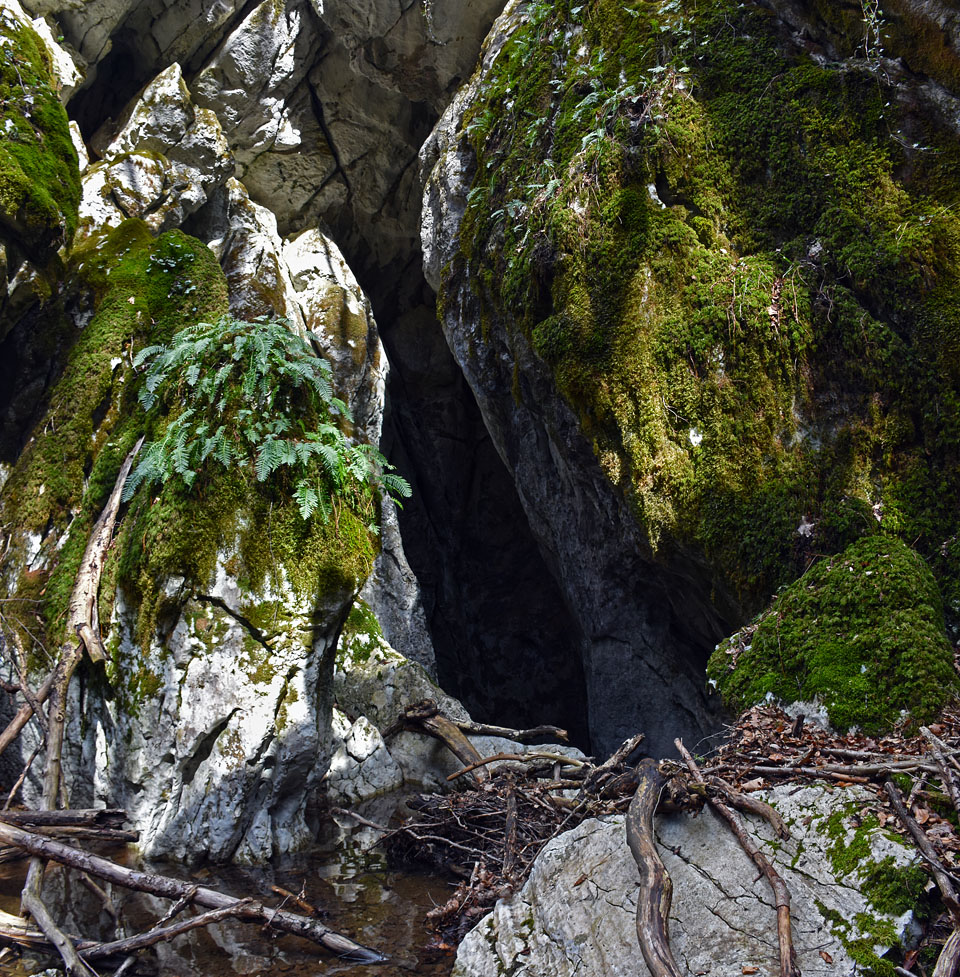
Odolina Cave

Odolina (pronounced [ɔˈdoːlina]) is a small settlement in the Municipality of Hrpelje-Kozina in the Littoral region of Slovenia.

The local church is dedicated to Saint Peter and belongs to the Parish of Brezovica.

== Blind valley ==
Odolina is a located in a typical karst blind valley. At its upper end the terrain is flysch, and Brašnica Creek flows across the surface. When it reaches the limestone of the Slavnik syncline, the creek first cuts a short gorge into the limestone and then it disappears underground into a large cave.

== Gallery ==
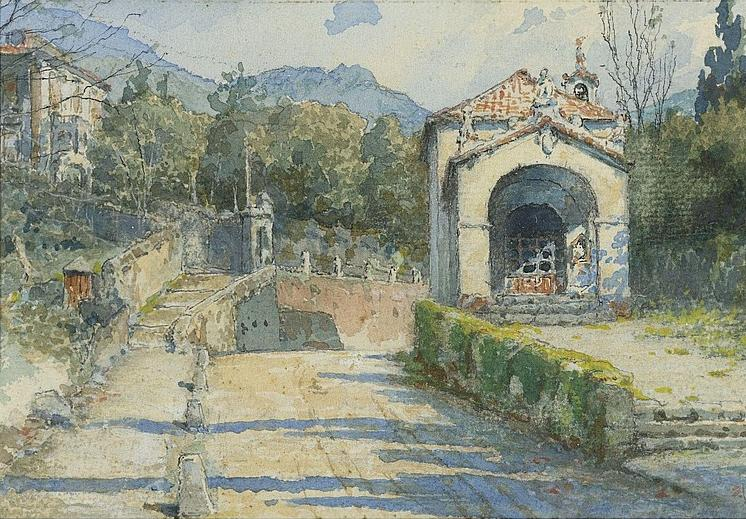
Villa and Gatehouse, Odolina. by Rafail Sergeevich Levitsky.(1907) The Di Rocco Wieler Private Collection, Toronto, Canada

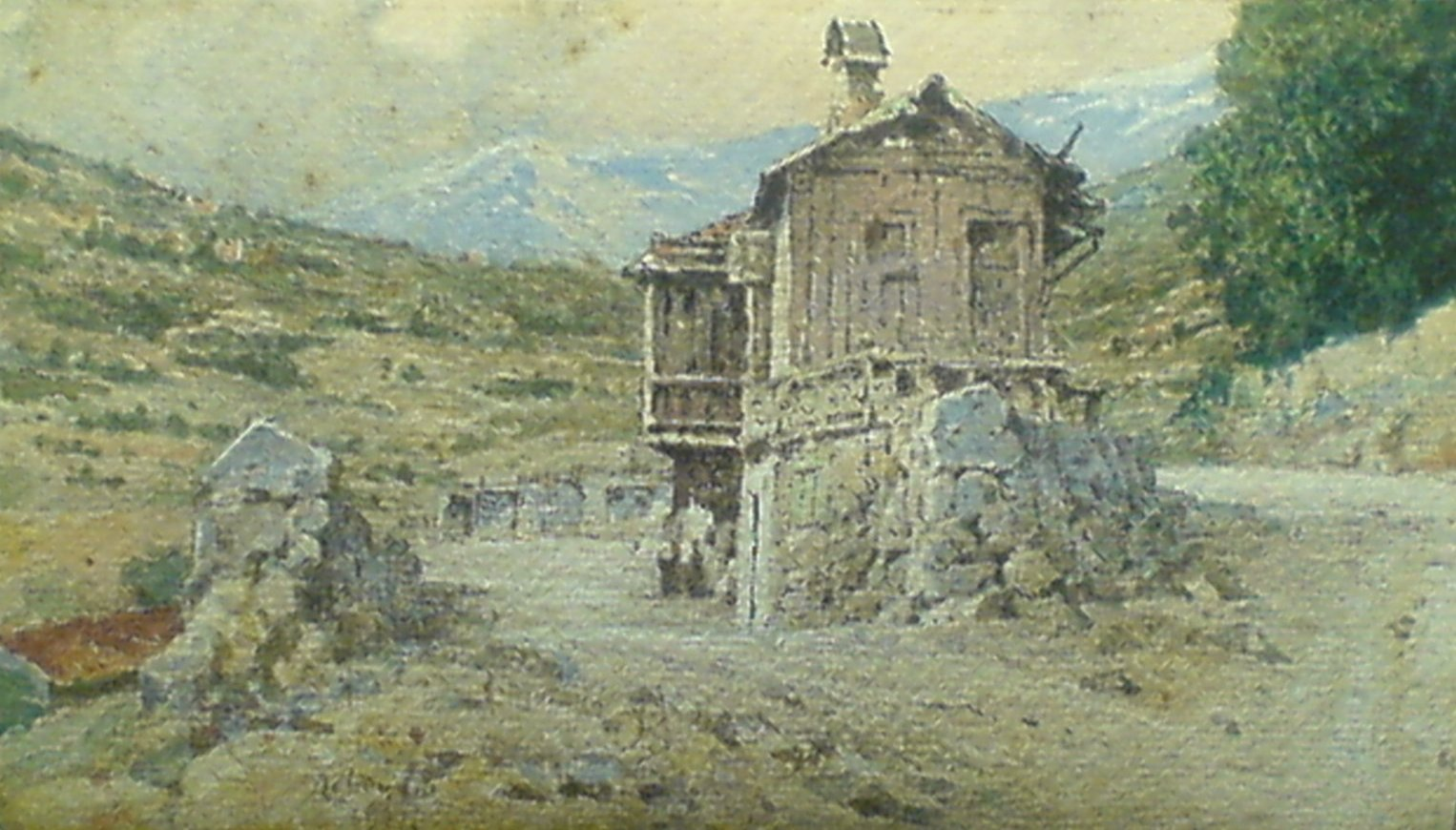
Gatehouse en route to Odolina by Rafail Sergeevich Levitsky.(1907) The Di Rocco Wieler Private Collection, Toronto, Canada

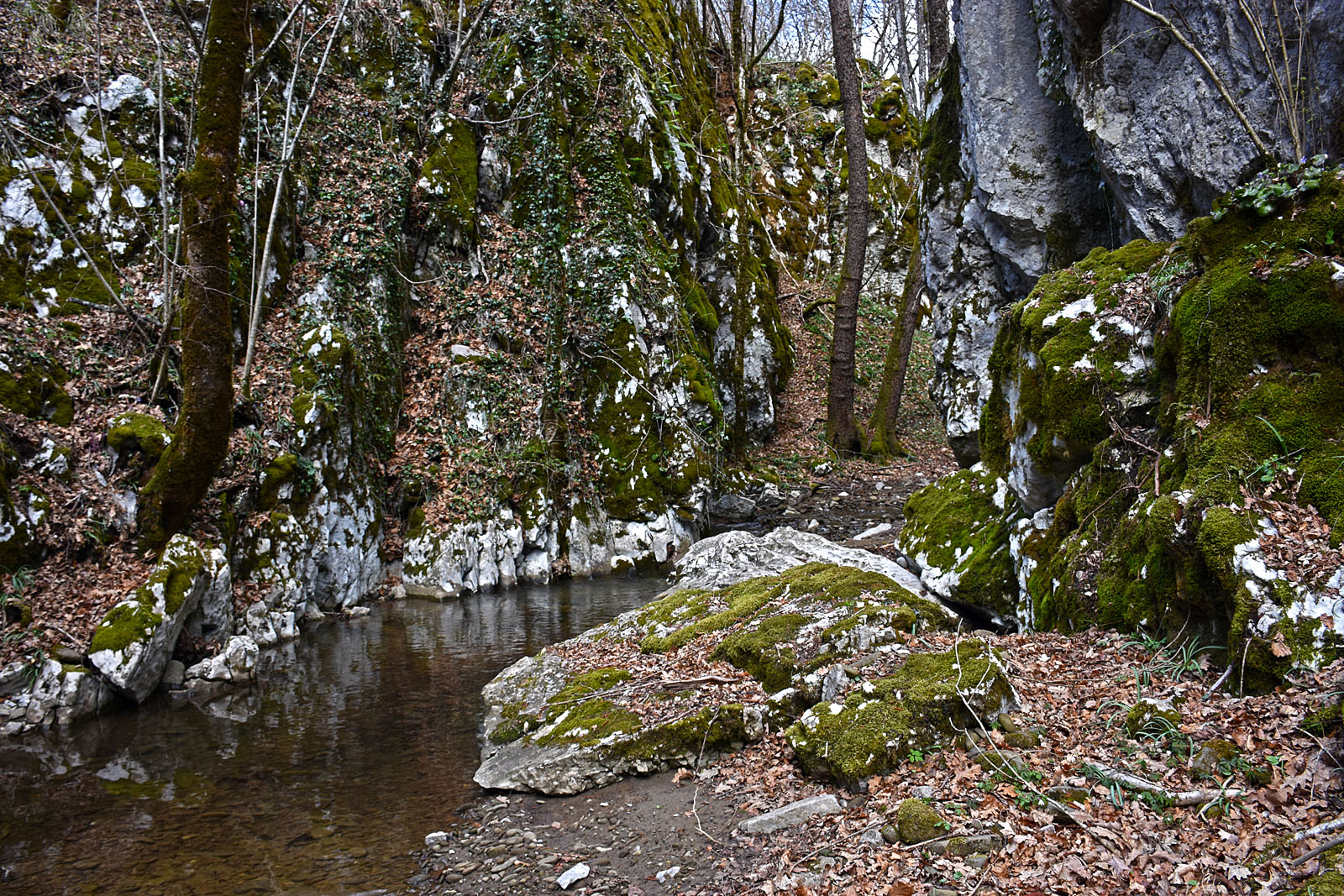
Brašnica Gorge
