= Beka, Hrpelje-Kozina =

Beka
- Location in Slovenia
- Coordinates: 45°35′57.43″N 13°53′38.39″E
- Country: Slovenia
- Traditional region: Littoral
- Statistical region: Coastal–Karst
- Municipality: Hrpelje-Kozina

Area
  - Total: 4.58 km^{2} (1.77 sq mi)
- Elevation: 420 m (1,380 ft)

Population (2002)
  - Total: 13

Beka (pronounced [ˈbeːka]; Italian: Becca) is a small settlement in the Municipality of Hrpelje-Kozina in the Littoral region of Slovenia on the border with Italy.

The local church is dedicated to Saint Lawrence and belongs to the parish of Klanec.
