= Markovščina =

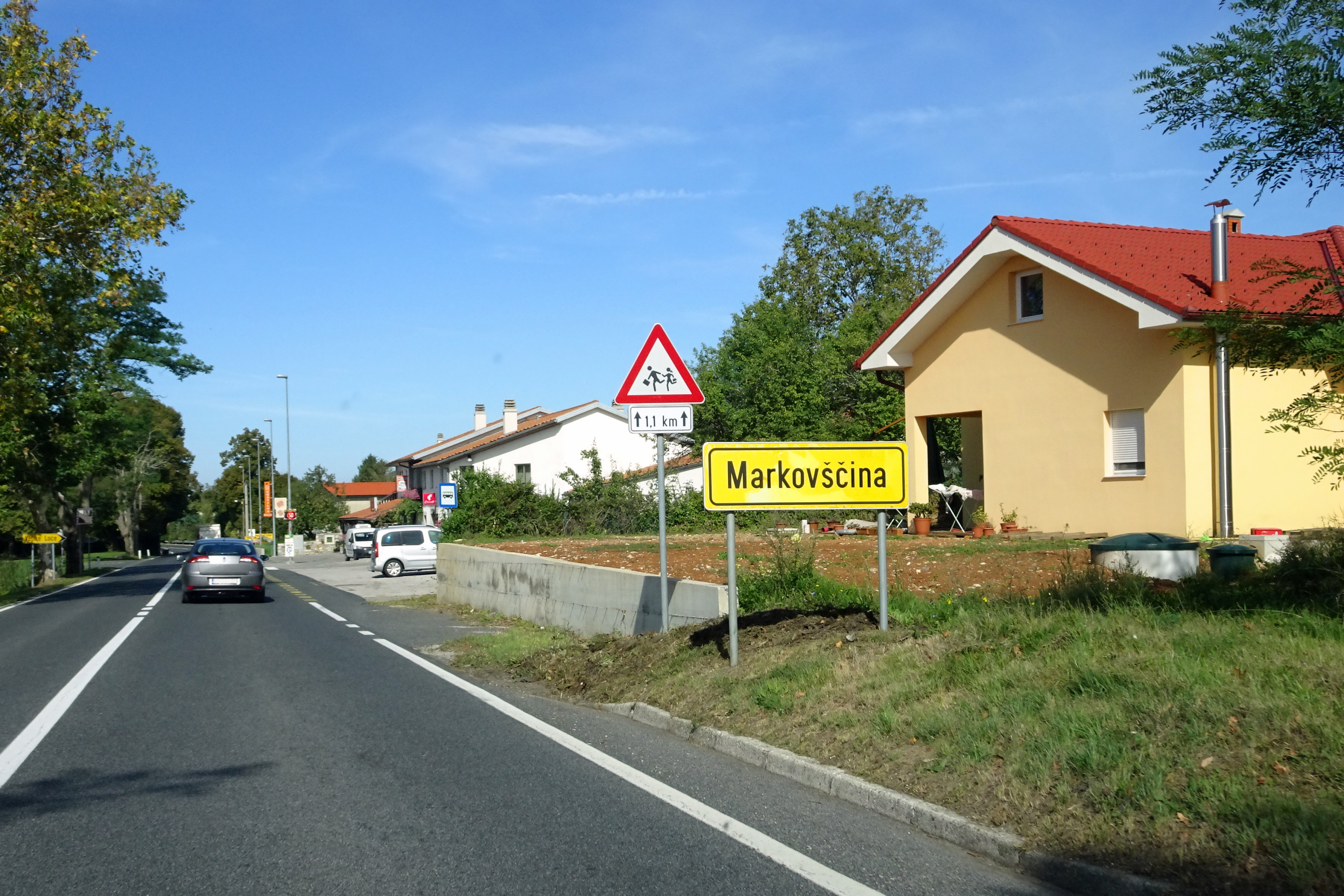

- Location in Slovenia
- Coordinates: 45°33′33.66″N 14°2′6.61″E
- Country: Slovenia
- Traditional region: Littoral
- Statistical region: Coastal–Karst
- Municipality: Hrpelje-Kozina

Area
  - Total: 3.83 km^{2} (1.48 sq mi)
- Elevation: 561.9 m (1,844 ft)

Population (2002)
  - Total: 115

Markovščina (pronounced [ˈmaːɾkɔu̯ʃtʃina]; Italian: Marcossina) is a clustered village in the Municipality of Hrpelje-Kozina in the Littoral region of Slovenia.

== Geography ==
Markovščina lies in the heart of the karst Materija Lowland (Slovene: Matarsko podolje), also known as the Podgrad Lowland (Slovene: Podgrajsko podolje), a dry valley extending from Kozina to Starod. It is connected by road to Materija to the northwest and Podgrad to the southeast.

== Name ==
Markovščina was first attested in written records in 1295 and 1371 as sancti Marci (and as S. Marco in 1 475, de Marcossa in 1512, and Marcouschena in 1694). The name is derived from the adjective markovski 'Mark's' from the saint's name Mark (cf. the similarly suffixed name Ajdovščina < ajd- 'pagan'). The name therefore means 'settlement near St. Mark's Church', to which the current Saint Anthony's Church was formerly dedicated. An alternative name for Markovščina, attested in a 1295 manuscript, was Novak(i).

== Church ==
The local church is dedicated to Saint Anthony of Padua and belongs to the Parish of Slivje.
