= Rožice =

- Location in Slovenia
- Coordinates: 45°35′20.52″N 13°59′31.15″E
- Country: Slovenia
- Traditional region: Littoral
- Statistical region: Coastal–Karst
- Municipality: Hrpelje-Kozina

Area
  - Total: 2.61 km^{2} (1.01 sq mi)
- Elevation: 513.9 m (1,686 ft)

Population (2002)
  - Total: 288

Rožice (pronounced [ˈɾoːʒitsɛ]) is a small village southeast of Hrpelje in the Municipality of Hrpelje-Kozina in the Littoral region of Slovenia.
