= Črnotiče =

Črnotiče Cernotti
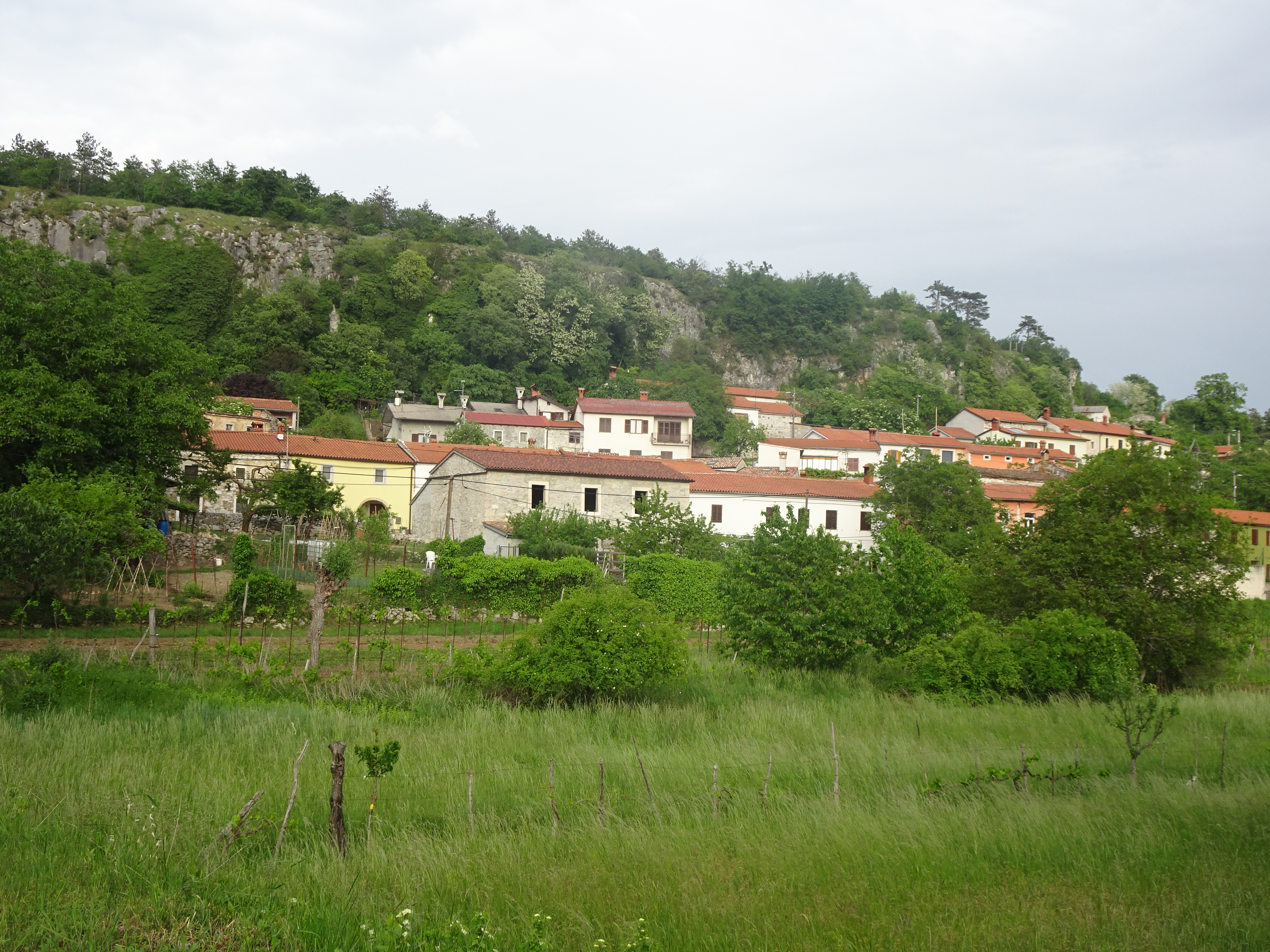

- Location in Slovenia
- Coordinates: 45°33′4.89″N 13°53′50.99″E
- Country: Slovenia
- Traditional region: Littoral
- Statistical region: Coastal–Karst
- Municipality: Koper

Area
  - Total: 7.45 km^{2} (2.88 sq mi)
- Elevation: 387.3 m (1,271 ft)

Population (2002)
  - Total: 85

Črnotiče (pronounced [tʃəɾˈnoːtitʃɛ]; Italian: Cernotti) is a settlement near Črni Kal in the City Municipality of Koper in the Littoral region of Slovenia. It includes the hamlets of Na Placu (Slovene: Na placu) near St. Paul's Church, Na Vršiču (Na vršiču) in the center of the settlement, and lower-lying Na Križcah (Na križcah).

== History ==
Archaeological finds have been discovered south of the settlement, near the church dedicated to Our Lady of the Snows. A defense wall against Ottoman attacks is also located at the site.

=== Mass graves ===
Črnotiče is the site of two known mass graves associated with the Second World War. The Špirnica Mass Grave (Slovene: Grobišče Špirnica) is located northeast of the settlement, about 1.5 kilometers (0.93 mi) south of Petrinje. It contained the remains of at least 10 victims. Some of the remains were exhumed in 1992 and reburied in the Koper cemetery in 2004. The Č12 Cave Mass Grave (Grobišče Jama č12) is located in a shaft northwest of the settlement, in the Grucelj karst area near the Gradis quarry. It contains the remains of undetermined victims based on reports from spelunkers.

== Church ==
The local church is dedicated to Saint Paul and belongs to the Parish of Podgorje. A second church, dedicated to Our Lady of the Snows, is located south of the settlement.
