= Ritomeče =

- Location in Slovenia
- Coordinates: 45°33′31.74″N 14°4′6.54″E
- Country: Slovenia
- Traditional region: Littoral
- Statistical region: Coastal–Karst
- Municipality: Hrpelje-Kozina

Area
  - Total: 0.99 km^{2} (0.38 sq mi)
- Elevation: 630.9 m (2,070 ft)

Population (2002)
  - Total: 46

Ritomeče (pronounced [ɾitɔˈmɛːtʃɛ]) is a small settlement above Gradišče in the Municipality of Hrpelje-Kozina in the Littoral region of Slovenia.
