= Gradišica =

Gradišica Gradiščica (until 1992)
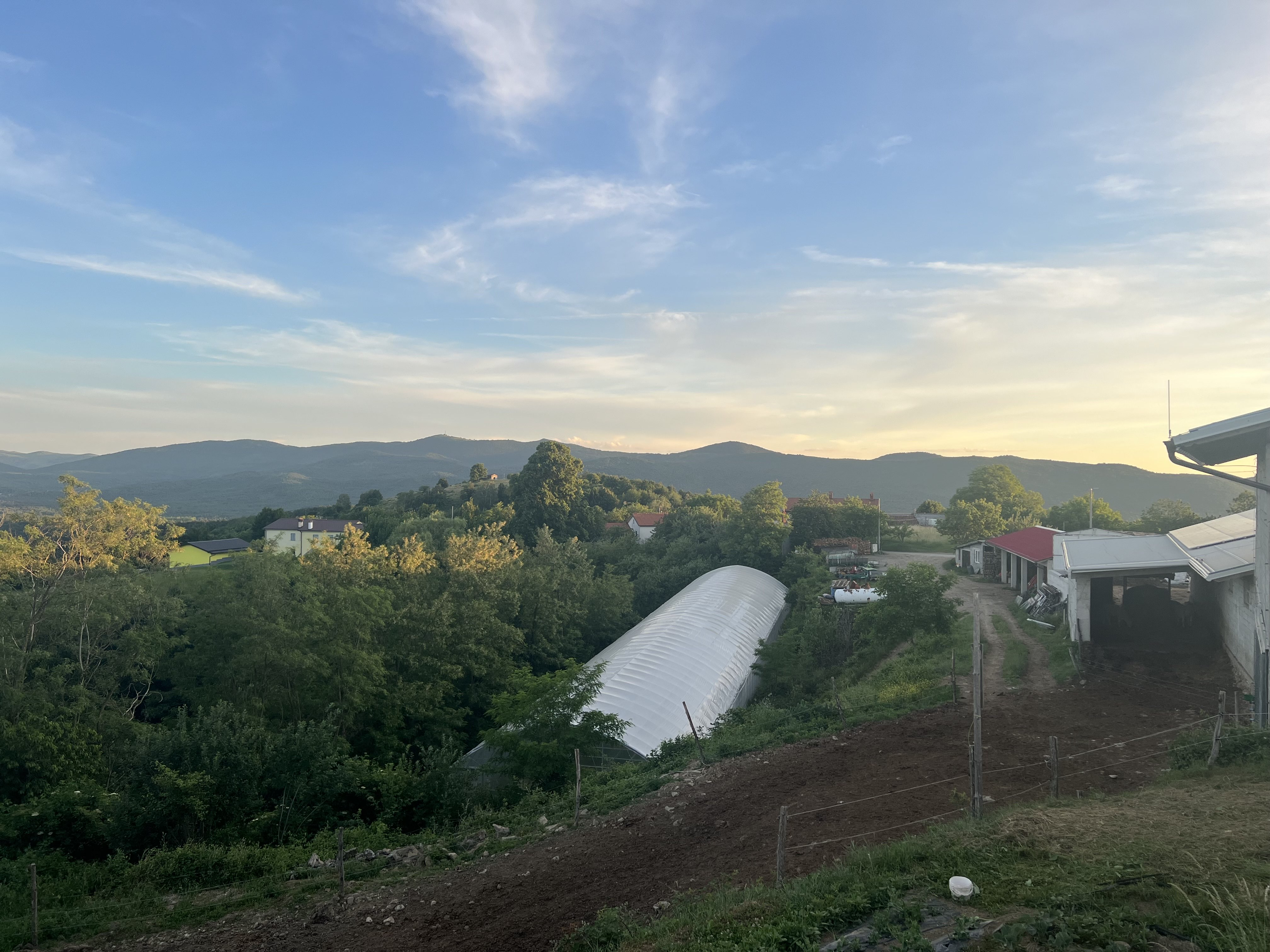
- Gradišica in 2022

- Location in Slovenia
- Coordinates: 45°35′55.5″N 14°0′44.82″E
- Country: Slovenia
- Traditional region: Littoral
- Statistical region: Coastal–Karst
- Municipality: Hrpelje-Kozina

Area
  - Total: 1.63 km^{2} (0.63 sq mi)
- Elevation: 659.5 m (2,164 ft)

Population (2002)
  - Total: 29

Gradišica (pronounced [ɡɾaˈdiːʃitsa]) is a small village in the Municipality of Hrpelje-Kozina in the Littoral region of Slovenia.

== Name ==
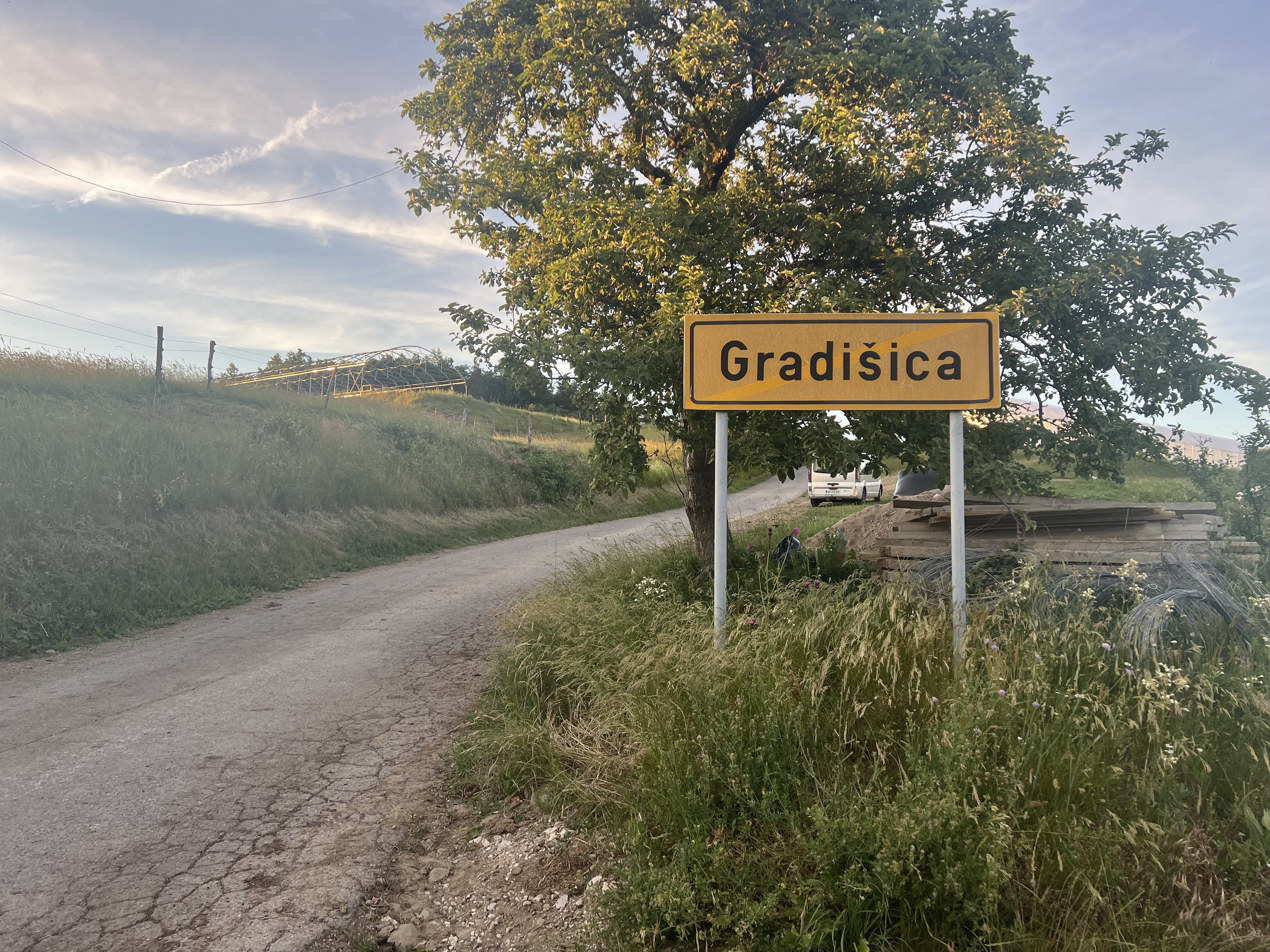
The sign marking Gradišica in 2022

The name of the settlement was changed from Gradiščica to Gradišica in 1992.

== Church ==
The local church is dedicated to the Virgin Mary and belongs to the Parish of Brezovica.
