= Prešnica =

- Location in Slovenia
- Coordinates: 45°34′16.91″N 13°56′19.02″E
- Country: Slovenia
- Traditional region: Littoral
- Statistical region: Coastal–Karst
- Municipality: Hrpelje-Kozina

Area
  - Total: 17.15 km^{2} (6.62 sq mi)
- Elevation: 459.2 m (1,507 ft)

Population (2002)
  - Total: 133

Prešnica (pronounced [ˈpɾeːʃnitsa]; Italian: Bresenza) is a village in the Municipality of Hrpelje-Kozina in the Littoral region of Slovenia.

The local church is dedicated to Saint Gertrude and belongs to the Parish of Klanec.
