= Mrse =

Mrse or variant may refer to:

- Mrše, a small village in the municipality of Hrpelje–Kozina in the littoral region of Slovenia
- Mrs.E (鄂), see E (disambiguation)
- MRSE, Methicillin-resistant Staphylococcus epidermidis
