= Vrhpolje, Hrpelje-Kozina =

Village in Littoral, Slovenia

Vrhpolje
- Location in Slovenia
- Coordinates: 45°37′38.44″N 13°55′47.99″E
- Country: Slovenia
- Traditional region: Littoral
- Statistical region: Coastal–Karst
- Municipality: Hrpelje-Kozina

Area
  - Total: 6.51 km^{2} (2.51 sq mi)
- Elevation: 497.3 m (1,632 ft)

Population (2002)
  - Total: 79

Vrhpolje (pronounced [ʋəɾxˈpoːljɛ]; Italian: Verpolie) is a village in the Municipality of Hrpelje-Kozina in the Littoral region of Slovenia close to the border with Italy.

The local church, built on a hill above the settlement, is dedicated to Saint Thomas and belongs to the Parish of Draga.
