= Kovčice =

- Location in Slovenia
- Coordinates: 45°34′28.19″N 14°4′17.14″E
- Country: Slovenia
- Traditional region: Littoral
- Statistical region: Coastal–Karst
- Municipality: Hrpelje-Kozina

Area
  - Total: 2.7 km^{2} (1.0 sq mi)
- Elevation: 676.7 m (2,220 ft)

Population (2002)
  - Total: 60

Kovčice (pronounced [ˈkoːu̯tʃitsɛ]) is a small village in the Municipality of Hrpelje-Kozina in the Littoral region of Slovenia.

The local church, built on a hill above the settlement, is dedicated to Saint Stephen and belongs to the Parish of Slivje.
