= Rodik =

- Village
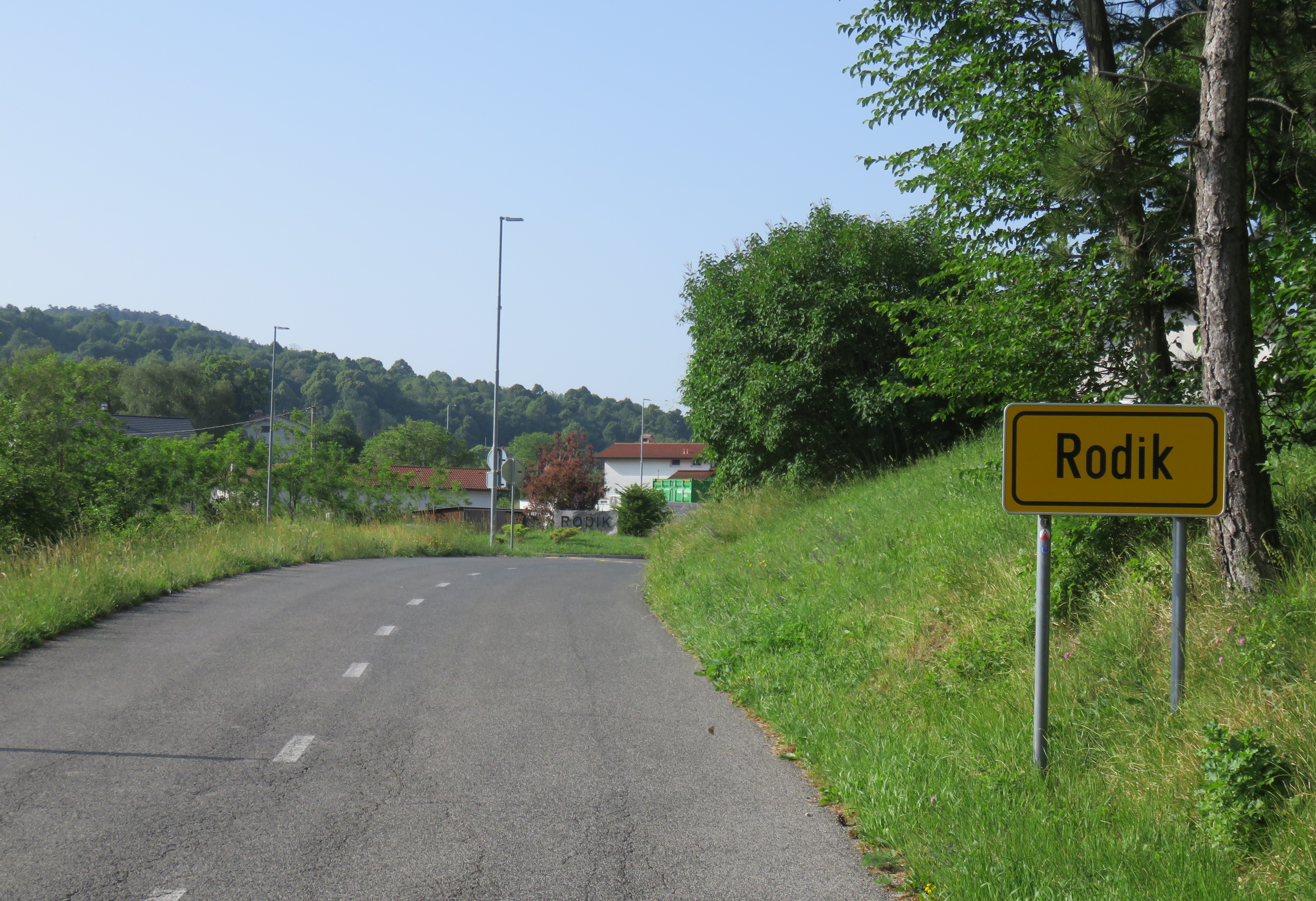

- Location in Slovenia
- Coordinates: 45°37′32.98″N 13°58′48.61″E
- Country: Slovenia
- Traditional region: Littoral
- Statistical region: Coastal–Karst
- Municipality: Hrpelje-Kozina

Area
  - Total: 10.99 km^{2} (4.24 sq mi)
- Elevation: 571.5 m (1,875 ft)

Population (2002)
  - Total: 288

Rodik (pronounced [ˈɾɔːdik]) is a village northeast of Kozina in the Municipality of Hrpelje-Kozina in the Littoral region of Slovenia.

The parish church in the settlement is dedicated to the Trinity and belongs to the Koper Diocese.
