= Poljane pri Podgradu =

- Village
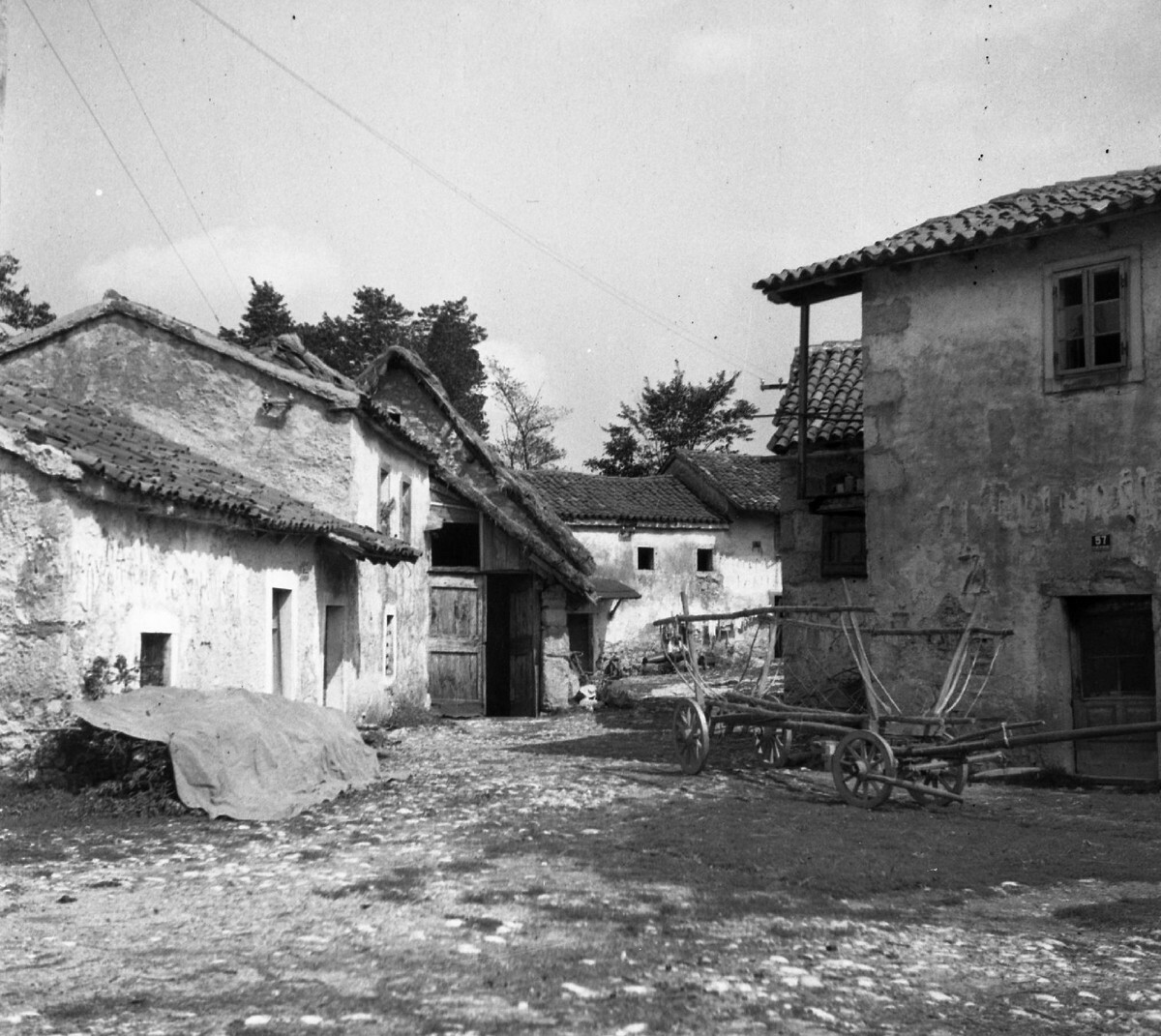
- Poljane in 1955

- Location in Slovenia
- Coordinates: 45°30′20.48″N 14°5′51.51″E
- Country: Slovenia
- Traditional region: Littoral
- Statistical region: Coastal–Karst
- Municipality: Hrpelje-Kozina

Area
  - Total: 9.17 km^{2} (3.54 sq mi)
- Elevation: 416.8 m (1,367 ft)

Population (2002)
  - Total: 9

Poljane pri Podgradu (pronounced [pɔˈljaːnɛ pɾi pɔdˈɡɾaːdu]; Italian: Pogliane) is a small village in the Municipality of Hrpelje-Kozina in the Littoral region of Slovenia close to the border with Croatia.

== Name ==
The name of the settlement was changed from Poljane to Poljane pri Podgradu in 1953.

== Church ==
The local church is dedicated to Saint Anthony of Padua and belongs to the Parish of Golac.
