= Orehek pri Materiji =

- Location in Slovenia
- Coordinates: 45°34′59.04″N 14°3′46.19″E
- Country: Slovenia
- Traditional region: Littoral
- Statistical region: Coastal–Karst
- Municipality: Hrpelje-Kozina

Area
  - Total: 2.46 km^{2} (0.95 sq mi)
- Elevation: 707.2 m (2,320 ft)

Population (2002)
  - Total: 15

Orehek pri Materiji (pronounced [ɔˈɾeːxək pɾi matɛˈɾiːji]) is a small settlement in the Municipality of Hrpelje-Kozina in the Littoral region of Slovenia.

== Name ==
The name of the settlement was changed from Orehek to Orehek pri Materiji in 1955.
