= Povžane =

- Location in Slovenia
- Coordinates: 45°34′25.86″N 14°0′17.79″E
- Country: Slovenia
- Traditional region: Littoral
- Statistical region: Coastal–Karst
- Municipality: Hrpelje-Kozina

Area
  - Total: 7.95 km^{2} (3.07 sq mi)
- Elevation: 524.7 m (1,721 ft)

Population (2002)
  - Total: 101

Povžane (pronounced [pɔu̯ˈʒaːnɛ]) is a small village next to Materija in the Municipality of Hrpelje-Kozina in the Littoral region of Slovenia close to the border with Croatia.
