= Javorje, Hrpelje-Kozina =

Javorje
- Village
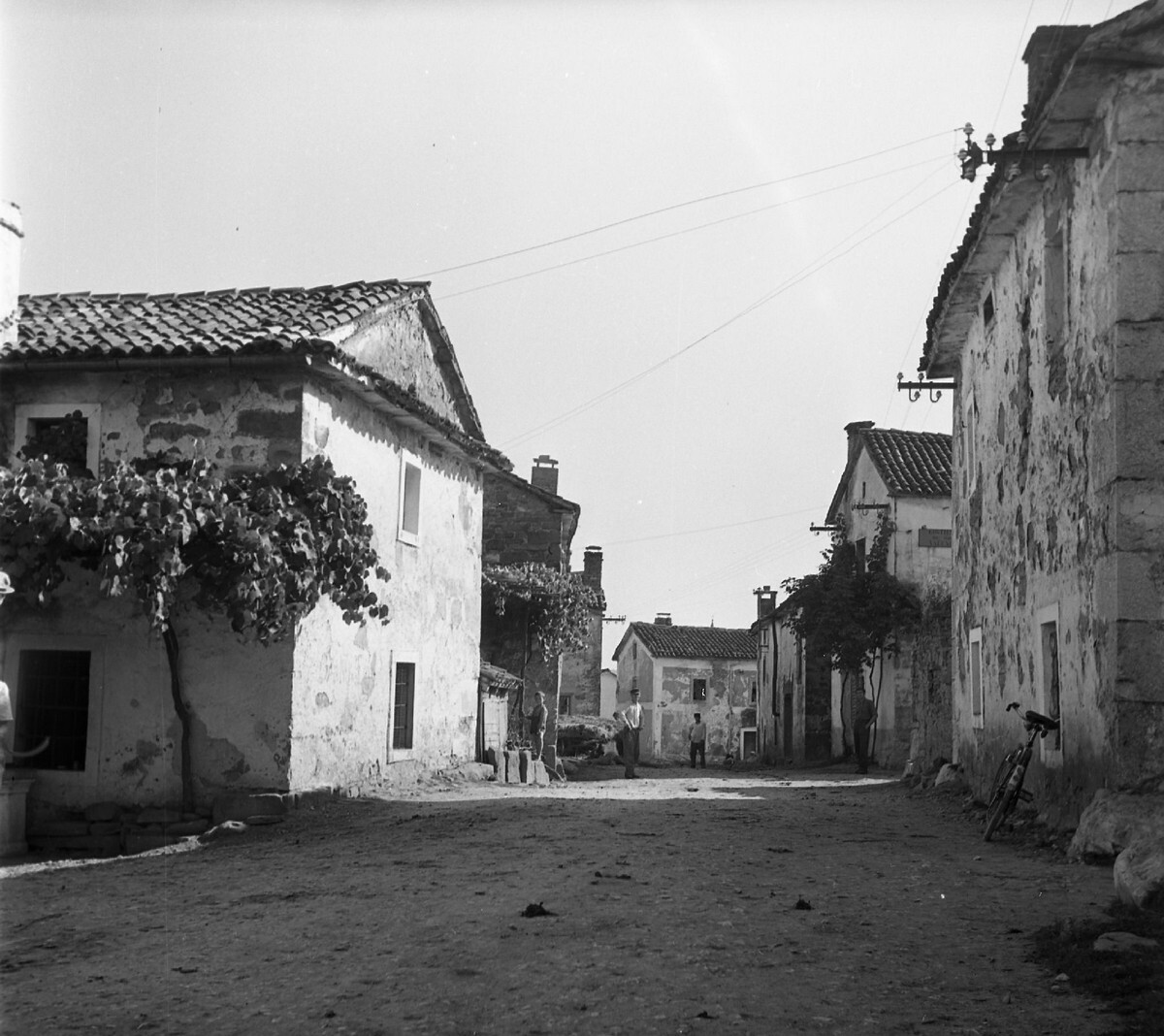
- Javorje in 1955

- Location in Slovenia
- Coordinates: 45°33′16.47″N 14°6′2.07″E
- Country: Slovenia
- Traditional region: Littoral
- Statistical region: Coastal–Karst
- Municipality: Hrpelje-Kozina

Area
  - Total: 4.49 km^{2} (1.73 sq mi)
- Elevation: 611.2 m (2,005 ft)

Population (2002)
  - Total: 145

Javorje (pronounced [ˈjaːʋɔɾjɛ]) is a village in the Municipality of Hrpelje-Kozina in the Littoral region of Slovenia.

The local church is dedicated to Saint John the Evangelist and belongs to the Parish of Hrušica.
