= Ostrovica, Hrpelje-Kozina =

Ostrovica
- Location in Slovenia
- Coordinates: 45°36′38.08″N 14°2′57″E
- Country: Slovenia
- Traditional region: Littoral
- Statistical region: Coastal–Karst
- Municipality: Hrpelje-Kozina

Area
  - Total: 2.74 km^{2} (1.06 sq mi)
- Elevation: 705.9 m (2,316 ft)

Population (2002)
  - Total: 15

Ostrovica (pronounced [ˈoːstɾɔʋitsa]; Italian: Ostrovizza) is a small village in the Municipality of Hrpelje-Kozina in the Littoral region of Slovenia. Until January 2007, the settlement was part of the Municipality of Divača.
