= Tatre, Hrpelje-Kozina =

Tatre
- Village
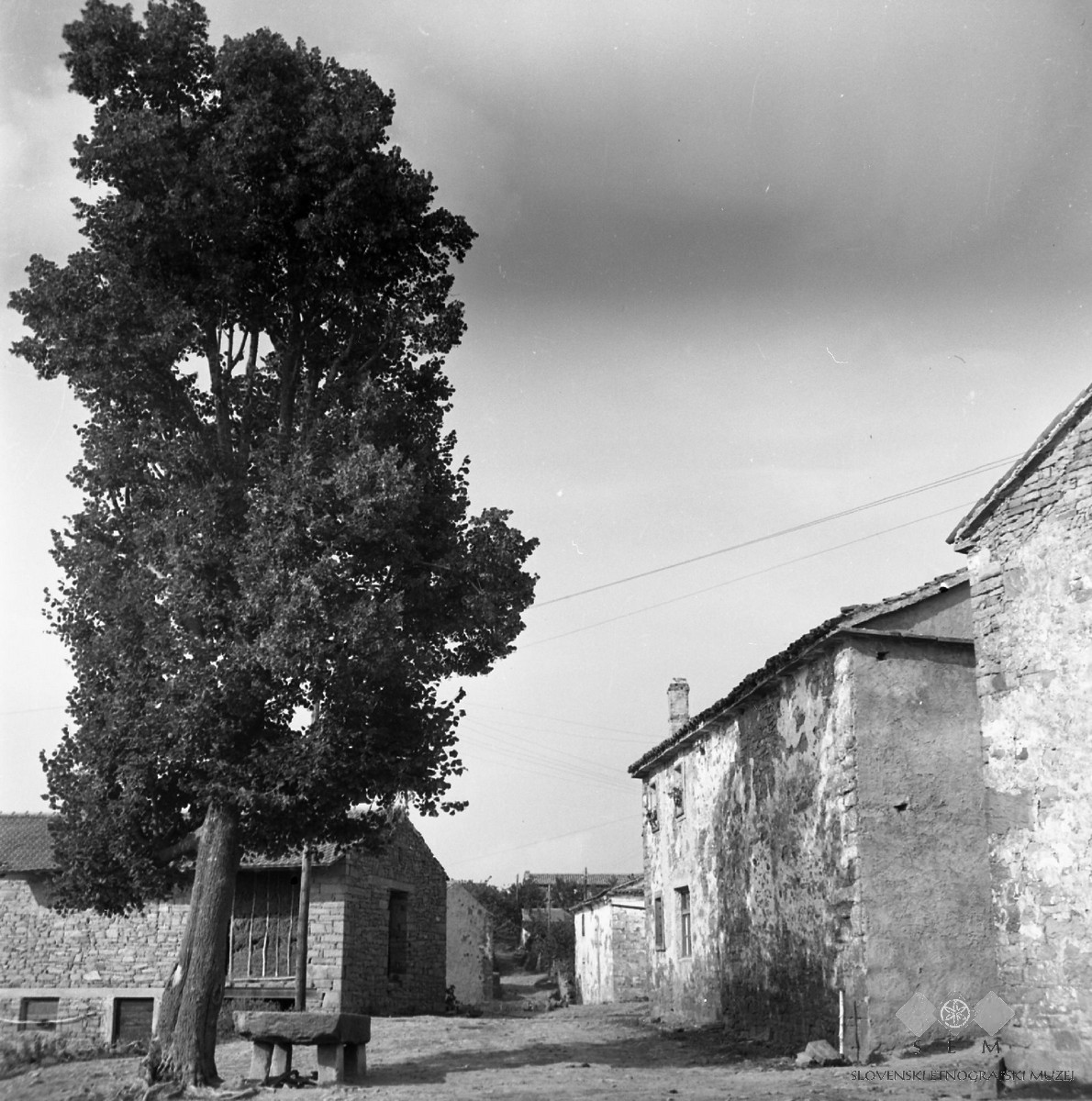
- Tatre in 1955

- Location in Slovenia
- Coordinates: 45°35′52.2″N 14°5′10.21″E
- Country: Slovenia
- Traditional region: Littoral
- Statistical region: Coastal–Karst
- Municipality: Hrpelje-Kozina

Area
  - Total: 6.85 km^{2} (2.64 sq mi)
- Elevation: 742 m (2,434 ft)

Population (2002)
  - Total: 54

Tatre (pronounced [ˈtaːtɾɛ]) is a village in the Municipality of Hrpelje-Kozina in the Littoral region of Slovenia close to the border with Croatia.

The local church is dedicated to Saint John the Evangelist and belongs to the Parish of Pregarje.
