= Skadanščina =

- Village
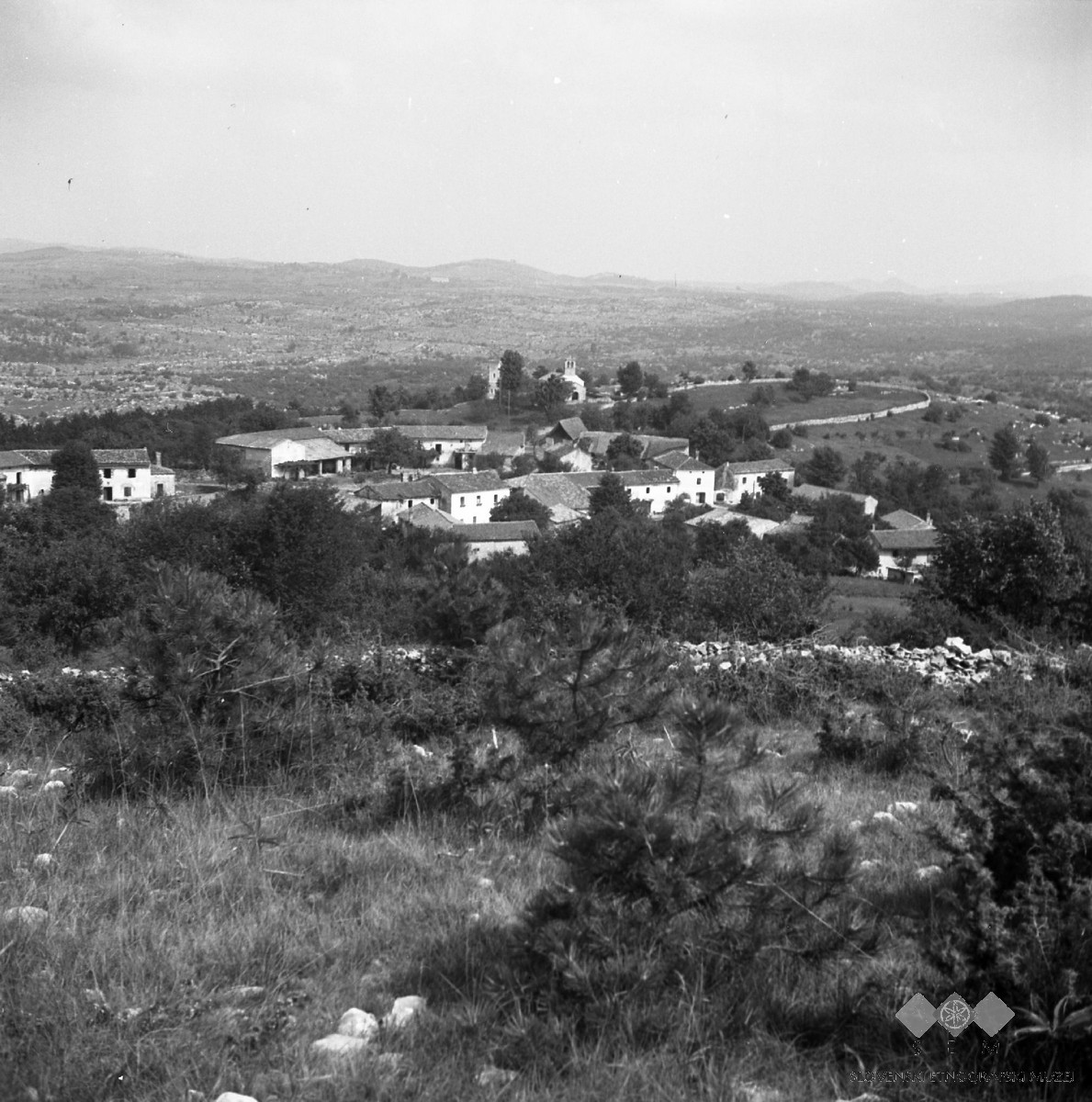
- Skadanščina in 1955

- Location in Slovenia
- Coordinates: 45°32′53.35″N 14°0′33.71″E
- Country: Slovenia
- Traditional region: Littoral
- Statistical region: Coastal–Karst
- Municipality: Hrpelje-Kozina

Area
  - Total: 11.43 km^{2} (4.41 sq mi)
- Elevation: 568.1 m (1,864 ft)

Population (2002)
  - Total: 45

Skadanščina (pronounced [skaˈdaːnʃtʃina]; Italian: Scadansina) is a small village in the Municipality of Hrpelje-Kozina in the Littoral region of Slovenia close to the border with Croatia.

== Mass grave ==
Skadanščina is the site of a mass grave associated with the Second World War. The Bukovje Cave Mass Grave (Slovene: Grobišče Jama v Bukovju) is located south-southwest of the village. It contains the remains of 12 German SS members.

== Church ==
The local church is dedicated to Saint Roch and belongs to the Parish of Slivje.
