= Petrinje =

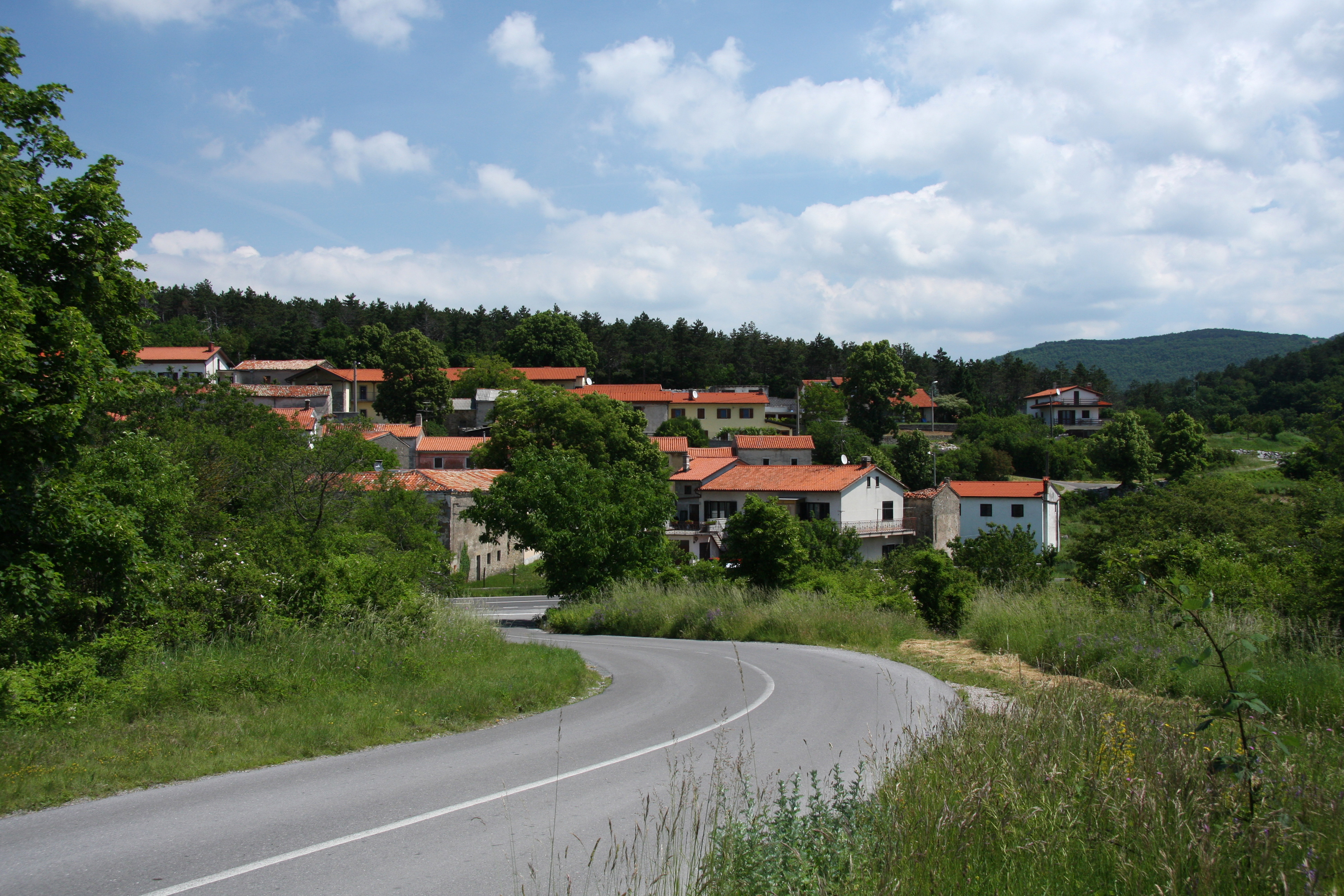

- Location in Slovenia
- Coordinates: 45°34′29.44″N 13°54′25.31″E
- Country: Slovenia
- Traditional region: Littoral
- Statistical region: Coastal–Karst
- Municipality: Hrpelje-Kozina

Area
  - Total: 4.69 km^{2} (1.81 sq mi)
- Elevation: 416.8 m (1,367 ft)

Population (2002)
  - Total: 47

Petrinje (pronounced [pɛˈtɾiːnjɛ]; Italian: Petrigne) is a small village in the Municipality of Hrpelje-Kozina in the Littoral region of Slovenia.

== Mass grave ==
Petrinje is the site of a mass grave associated with the Second World War. The Wasp Shaft Mass Grave (Slovene: Grobišče Osje brezno) is located in a terraced area west of Brdgodec Hill (elevation: 447 meters or 1,467 feet) north of Petrinje. It contains the remains of undetermined victims.

== Church ==
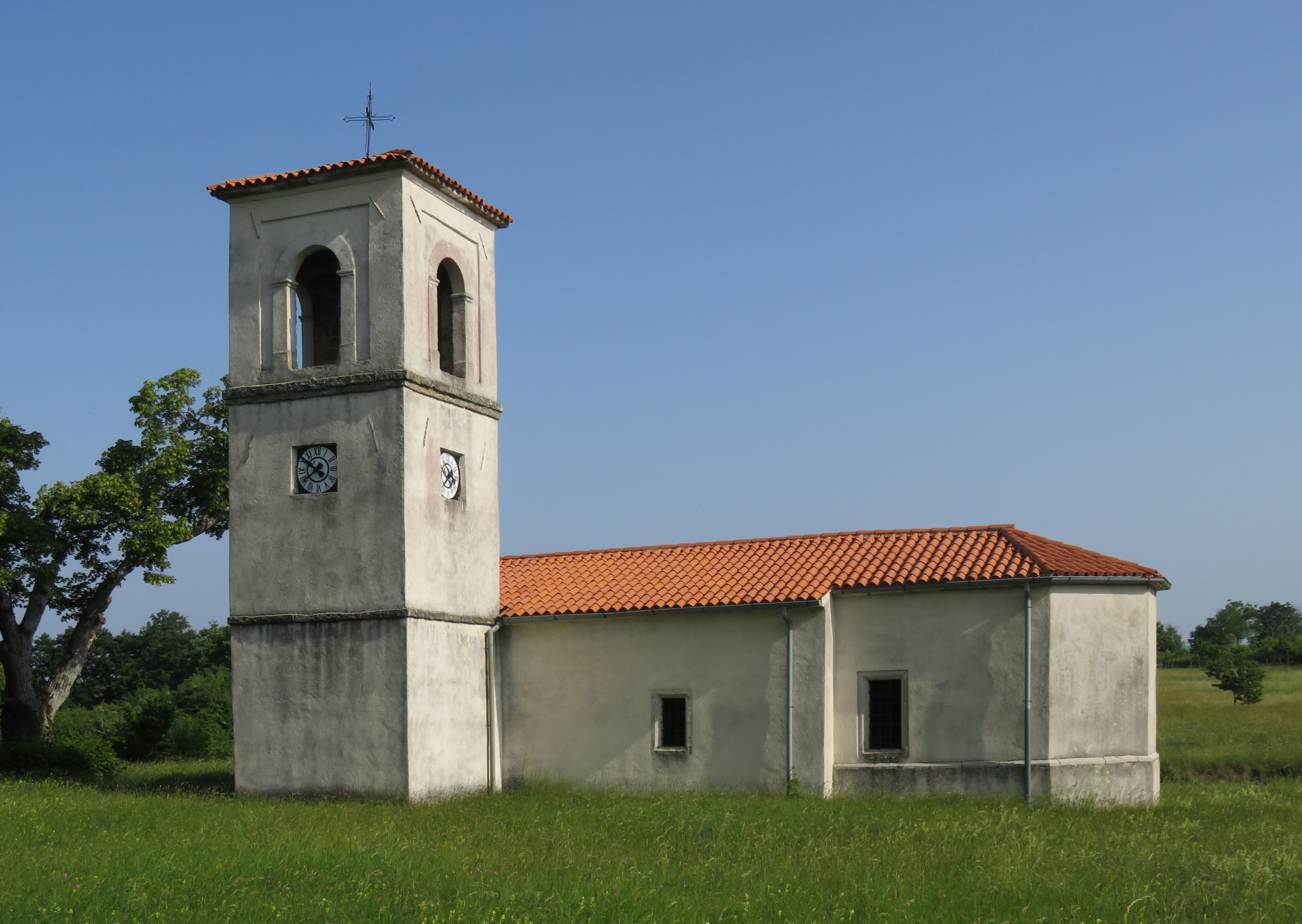
Saint Sebastian's Church

The local church is dedicated to Saint Sebastian and belongs to the Parish of Klanec.
