= Municipality of Hrpelje-Kozina =

Municipality of Slovenia

Municipality of Hrpelje–Kozina Občina Hrpelje - Kozina
- Municipality
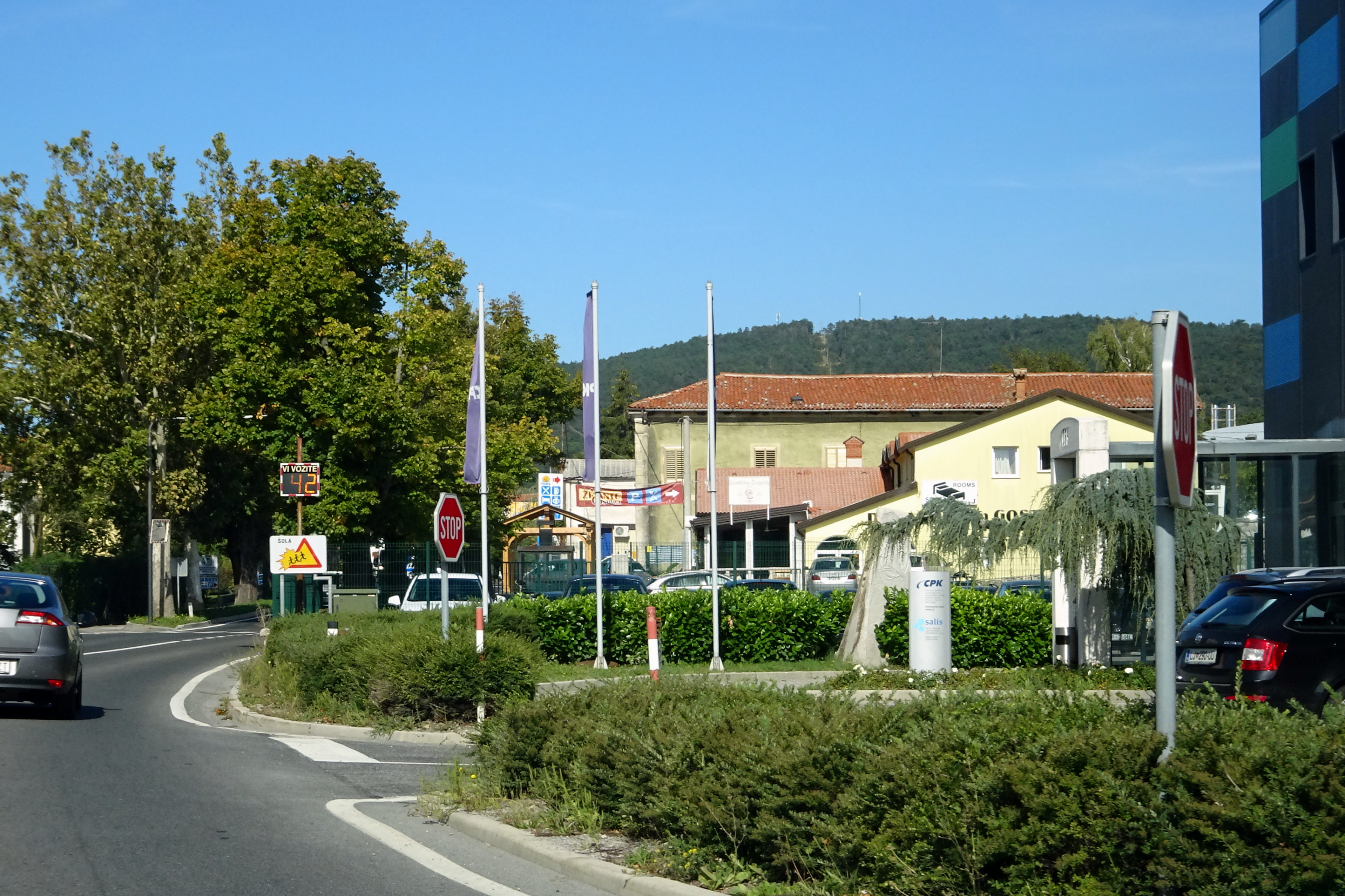
- Hrpelje

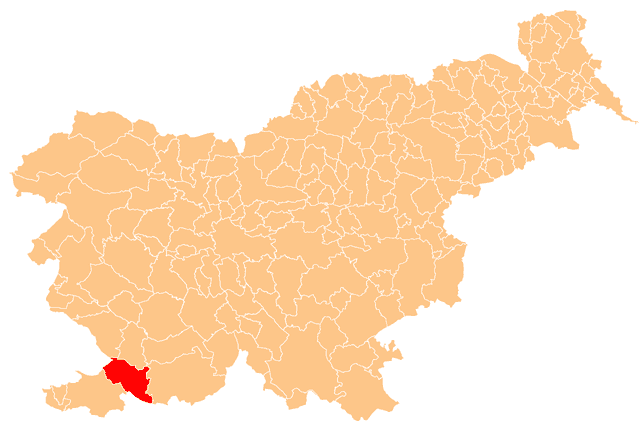
- Location of the Municipality of Hrpelje–Kozina in Slovenia
- Coordinates: 45°35′N 13°59′E
- Country: Slovenia

Government
  - Mayor: Saša Likavec Svetelšek (Independent)

Area
  - Total: 192.2 km^{2} (74.2 sq mi)

Population (2002)
  - Total: 4,038
  - Density: 21.01/km^{2} (54.41/sq mi)
- Time zone: UTC+01 (CET)
  - Summer (DST): UTC+02 (CEST)
- Website: www.hrpelje-kozina.si

The Municipality of Hrpelje–Kozina (pronounced [xəɾˈpeːljɛ kɔˈziːna]; Slovene: Občina Hrpelje - Kozina) is a municipality in the Littoral region of Slovenia. Its seat is the village of Hrpelje.

A major border crossing to Italy is located in the municipality at the village of Krvavi Potok. It connects to Pesek in the Municipality of San Dorligo della Valle (Dolina) near Trieste on the Italian side. It borders Italy and Croatia.

== Settlements ==
In addition to the municipal seat of Hrpelje, the municipality also includes the following settlements:

1. Artviže
2. Bač pri Materiji
3. Beka
4. Brezovica
5. Brezovo Brdo
6. Golac
7. Gradišče pri Materiji
8. Gradišica
9. Hotična
10. Javorje
11. Klanec pri Kozini
12. Kovčice
13. Kozina
14. Krvavi Potok
15. Markovščina
16. Materija
17. Mihele
18. Mrše
19. Nasirec
20. Obrov
21. Ocizla
22. Odolina
23. Orehek pri Materiji
24. Ostrovica
25. Petrinje
26. Poljane pri Podgradu
27. Povžane
28. Prešnica
29. Ritomeče
30. Rodik
31. Rožice
32. Skadanščina
33. Slivje
34. Slope
35. Tatre
36. Tublje pri Hrpeljah
37. Velike Loče
38. Vrhpolje
