= Tublje pri Hrpeljah =

- Village
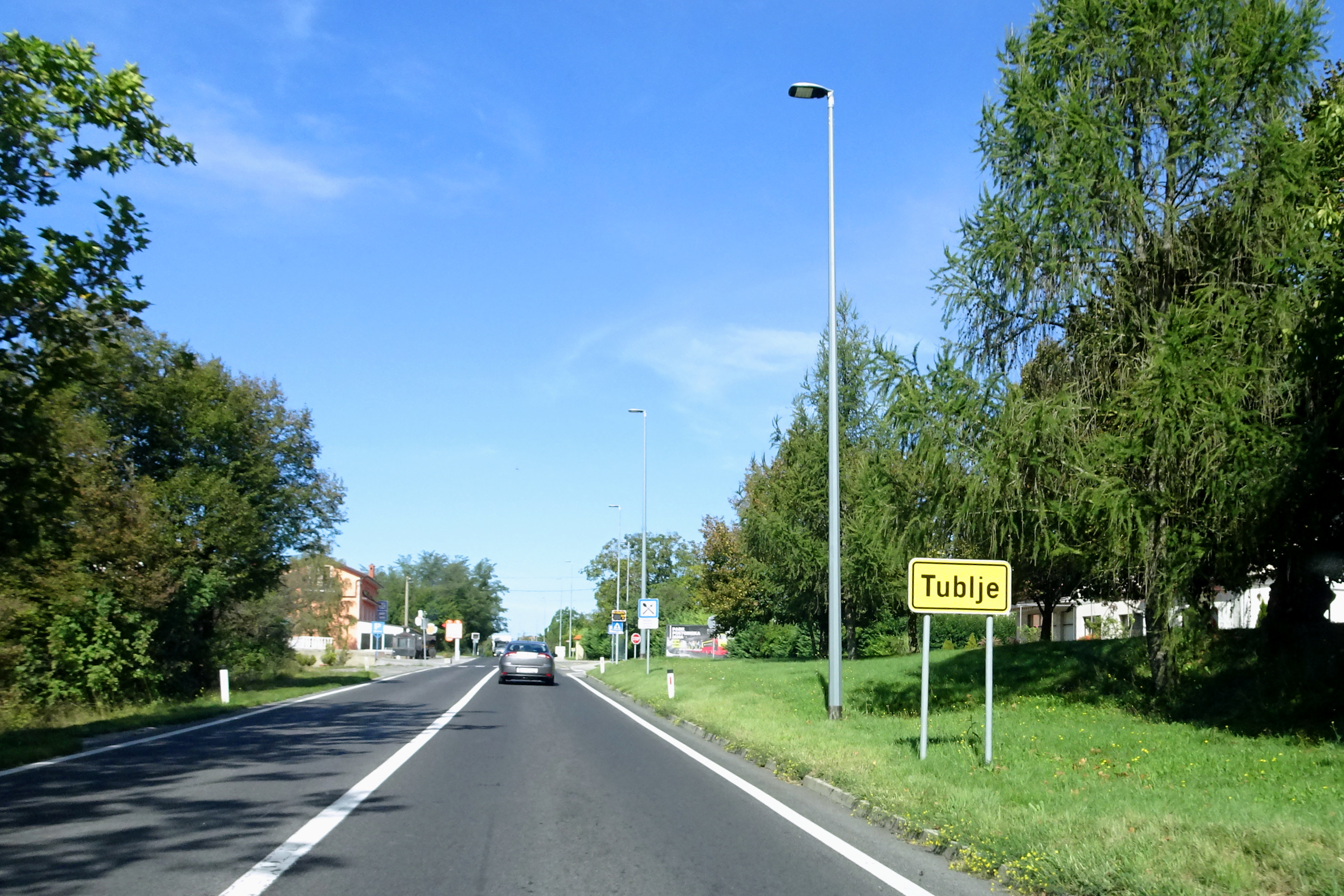

- Location in Slovenia
- Coordinates: pri Hrpeljah 45°35′45.54″N 13°58′27.02″E
- Country: Slovenia
- Traditional region: Littoral
- Statistical region: Coastal–Karst
- Municipality: Hrpelje-Kozina

Area
  - Total: 3.82 km^{2} (1.47 sq mi)
- Elevation: 501.4 m (1,645 ft)

Population (2002)
  - Total: 137

Tublje pri Hrpeljah (pronounced [ˈtuːbljɛ pɾi xəɾˈpeːljax]) is a village southeast of Hrpelje in the Municipality of Hrpelje-Kozina in the Littoral region of Slovenia close to the border with Croatia.

== Name ==
The name of the settlement was changed from Tublje to Tublje pri Hrpeljah in 1953.
