= Obrov, Hrpelje-Kozina =

Obrov
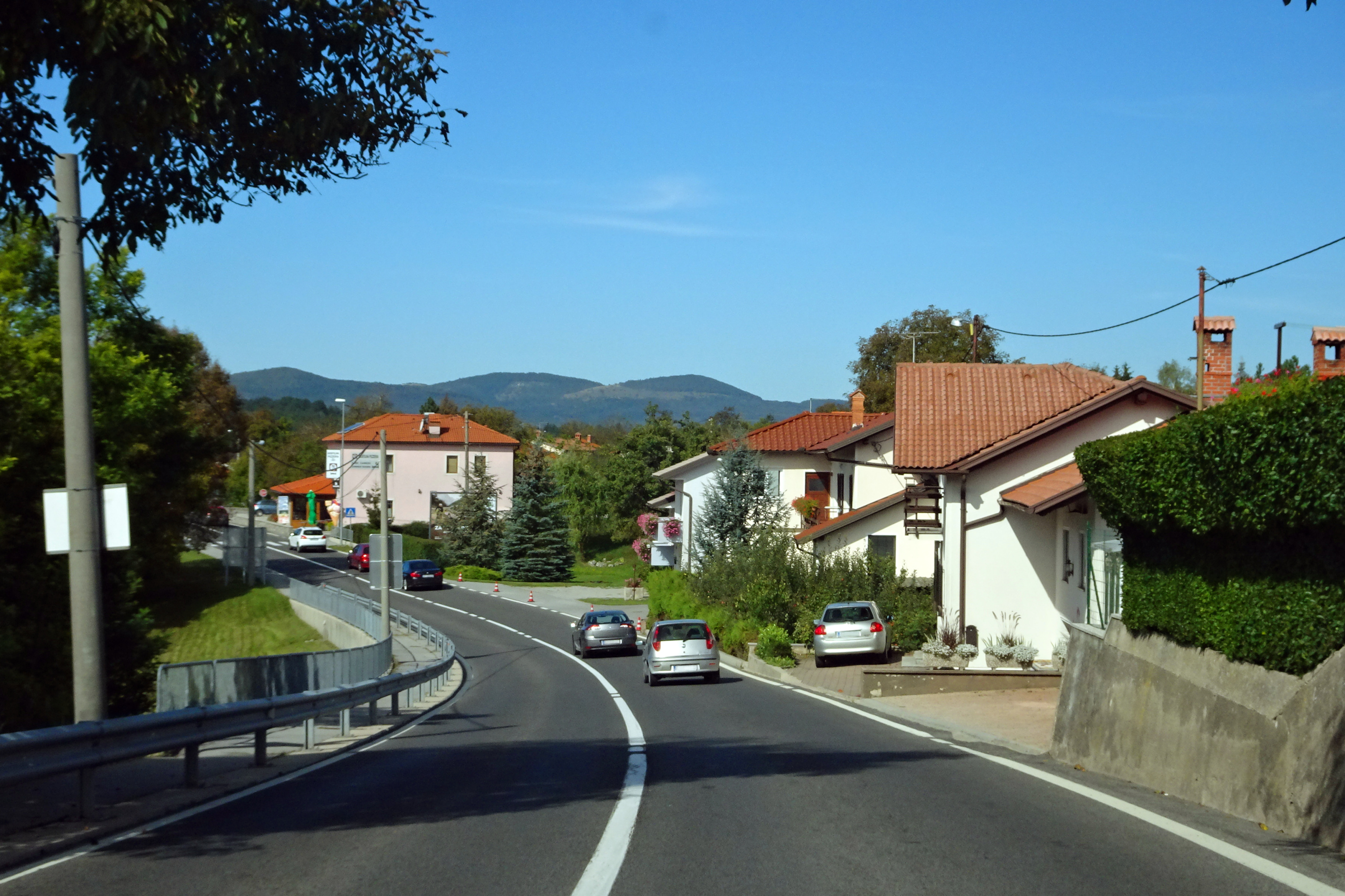

- Location in Slovenia
- Coordinates: 45°32′33.31″N 14°5′11.59″E
- Country: Slovenia
- Traditional region: Littoral
- Statistical region: Coastal–Karst
- Municipality: Hrpelje-Kozina

Area
  - Total: 6.45 km^{2} (2.49 sq mi)
- Elevation: 579.3 m (1,901 ft)

Population (2002)
  - Total: 187

Obrov (pronounced [ɔˈbɾoːu̯]; Italian: Obrovo Santa Maria) is a village in the Municipality of Hrpelje-Kozina in the Littoral region of Slovenia.

== Name ==
Obrov was first attested in written sources in 1763–87 as Obrova and Obroa. The name is derived from the Slovene common noun obrov 'steep slope between two level areas', referring to a local landscape feature.

== Church ==
The local church is dedicated to the Annunciation and belongs to the Parish of Hrušica.

== Mass grave ==
Obrov is the site of a mass grave associated with the Second World War. The Kaser Cave Mass Grave (Slovene: Grobišče Kaserova jama) is located along the road southwest of Obrov and northeast of Golac. The human remains in the cave are believed to be those of German soldiers and Slovene civilians.
