= Gradišče pri Materiji =

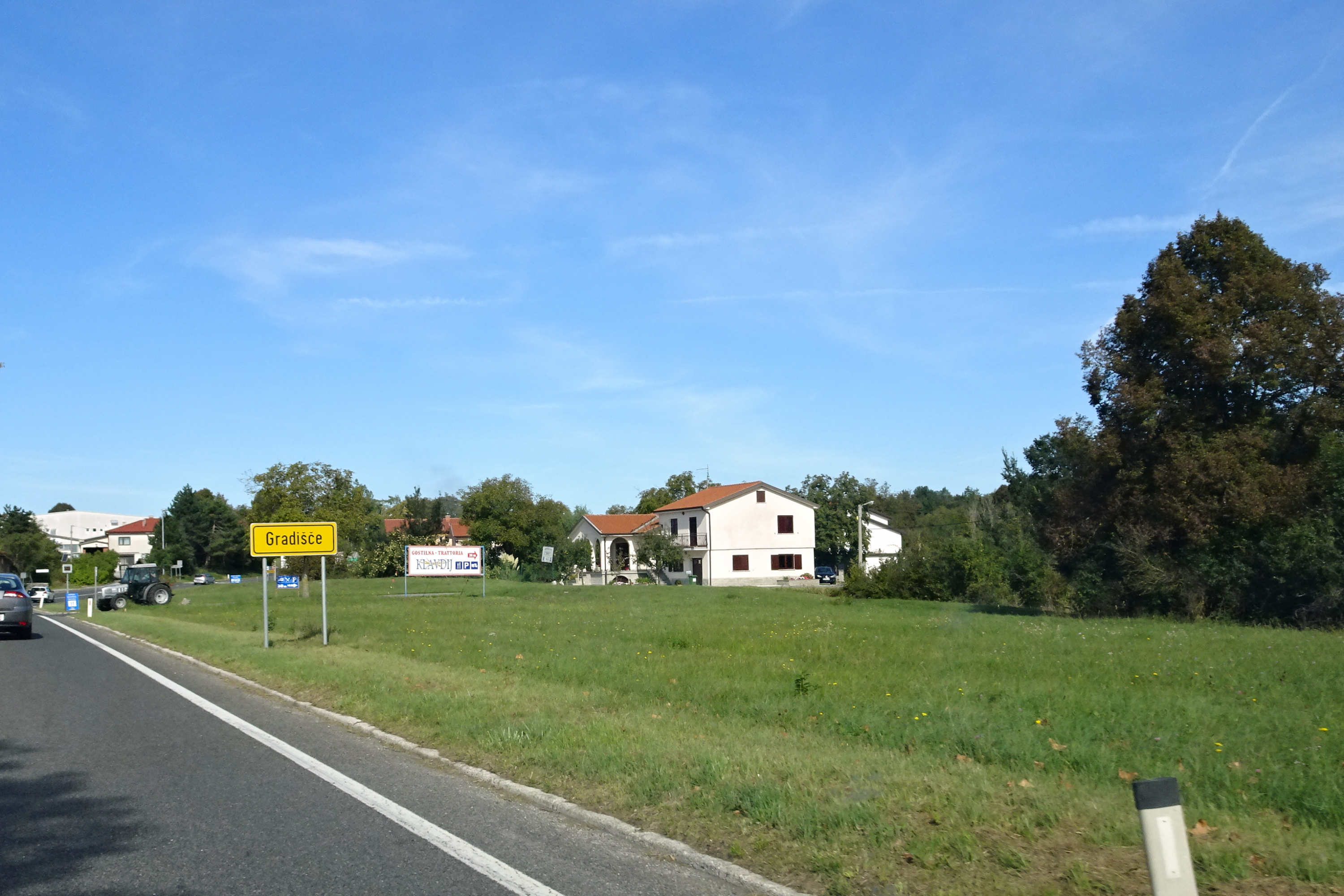

- Location in Slovenia
- Coordinates: 45°33′8.54″N 14°3′41.57″E
- Country: Slovenia
- Traditional region: Littoral
- Statistical region: Coastal–Karst
- Municipality: Hrpelje-Kozina

Area
  - Total: 6.95 km^{2} (2.68 sq mi)
- Elevation: 600.7 m (1,971 ft)

Population (2002)
  - Total: 164

Gradišče pri Materiji (pronounced [ɡɾaˈdiːʃtʃɛ pɾi matɛˈɾiːji]; Italian: Gradischie) is a village in the Municipality of Hrpelje-Kozina in the Littoral region of Slovenia.

== Name ==
The name of the settlement was changed from Gradišče to Gradišče pri Materiji in 1953.

== Church ==
The local church is dedicated to Saint Primus and belongs to the Parish of Slivje.
