= Brezovo Brdo =

- Location in Slovenia
- Coordinates: 45°34′39.64″N 14°5′11.39″E
- Country: Slovenia
- Traditional region: Littoral
- Statistical region: Coastal–Karst
- Municipality: Hrpelje-Kozina

Area
  - Total: 4.04 km^{2} (1.56 sq mi)
- Elevation: 649.6 m (2,131 ft)

Population (2002)
  - Total: 30

Brezovo Brdo (pronounced [ˈbɾeːzɔʋɔ ˈbəɾdɔ]) is a small village in the Municipality of Hrpelje-Kozina in the Littoral region of Slovenia.

The local church is dedicated to Saints Peter and Paul and belongs to the Parish of Pregarje.
