= Hotična =

- Location in Slovenia
- Coordinates: 45°34′41.27″N 14°1′54.85″E
- Country: Slovenia
- Traditional region: Littoral
- Statistical region: Coastal–Karst
- Municipality: Hrpelje-Kozina

Area
  - Total: 2.65 km^{2} (1.02 sq mi)
- Elevation: 566.7 m (1,859 ft)

Population (2002)
  - Total: 60

Hotična (pronounced [xɔˈtiːtʃna]; Italian: Coticcina) is a village in the Municipality of Hrpelje-Kozina in the Littoral region of Slovenia.

The local church, built on a hill above the settlement, is dedicated to Saint Pantaleon.
