= Krvavi Potok =

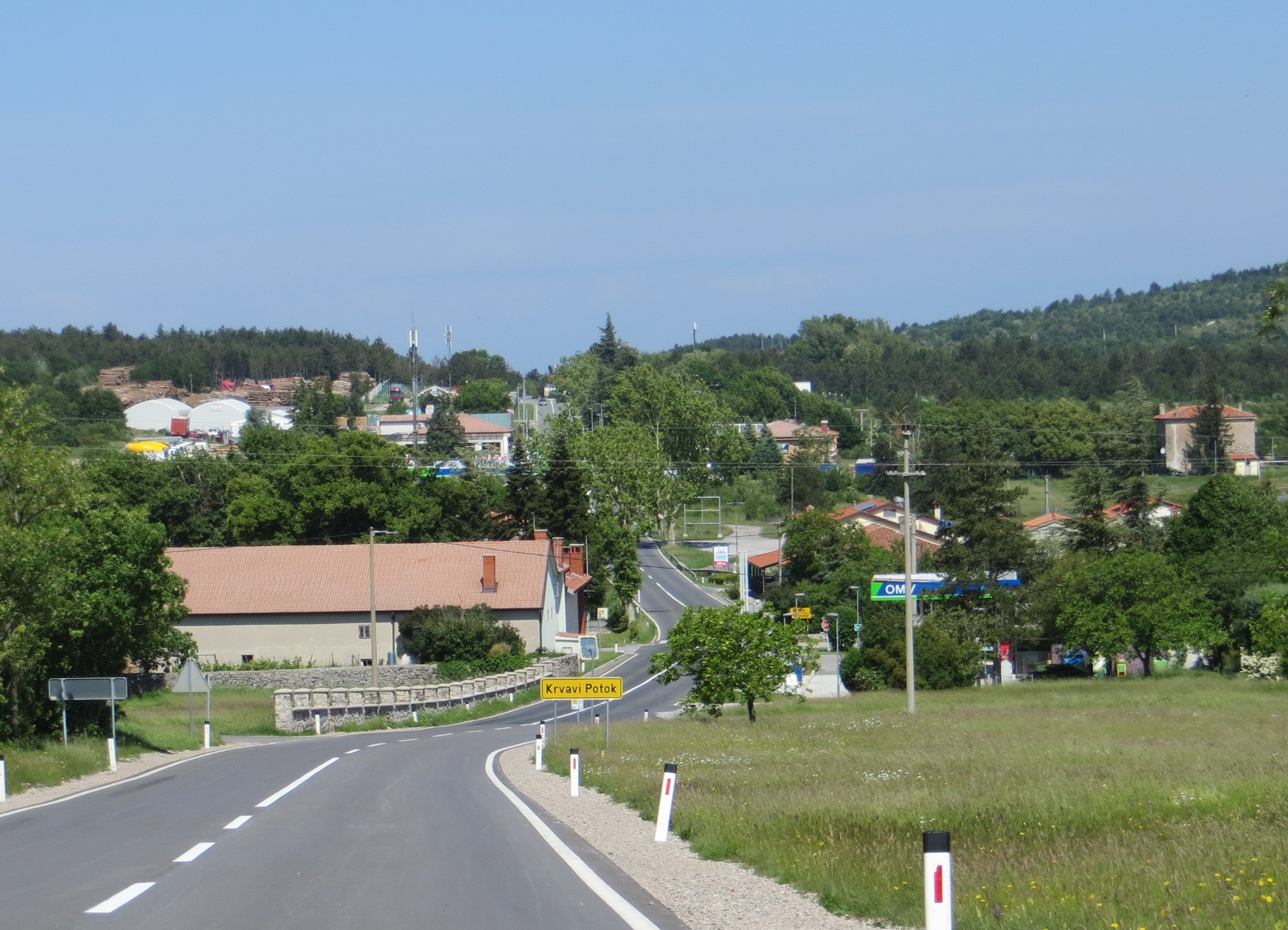

- Location in Slovenia
- Coordinates: 45°37′8.26″N 13°54′34.24″E
- Country: Slovenia
- Traditional region: Littoral
- Statistical region: Coastal–Karst
- Municipality: Hrpelje-Kozina

Area
  - Total: 0.63 km^{2} (0.24 sq mi)
- Elevation: 455.7 m (1,495 ft)

Population (2002)
  - Total: 73

Krvavi Potok (pronounced [kəɾˈʋaːʋi ˈpɔːtɔk]) is a settlement in the Municipality of Hrpelje-Kozina in the Littoral region of Slovenia on the border with Italy.

The Kozina border crossing into Italy is at Krvavi Potok. Since Slovenia's accession to the European Union and the Schengen area, customs and immigration checks have been abolished at the Italian–Slovenian border.

== Name ==
The name Krvavi Potok (and the stream of the same name, Krvavi potok) literally means 'bloody creek'. The name is said to date from the time of the Napoleonic wars, when the French authorities executed bandits in the area. However, another theory derives the name from the reddish color of the terrain at sunset or local reddish rock deposits.
