= Mrše =

- Location in Slovenia
- Coordinates: 45°35′11.74″N 14°2′36.31″E
- Country: Slovenia
- Traditional region: Littoral
- Statistical region: Coastal–Karst
- Municipality: Hrpelje-Kozina

Area
  - Total: 1.74 km^{2} (0.67 sq mi)
- Elevation: 723.5 m (2,374 ft)

Population (2002)
  - Total: 31

Mrše (pronounced [ˈməɾʃɛ]; Italian: Merse) is a small village in the Municipality of Hrpelje-Kozina in the Littoral region of Slovenia.
