= Podgrad, Ilirska Bistrica =

Podgrad
- Village
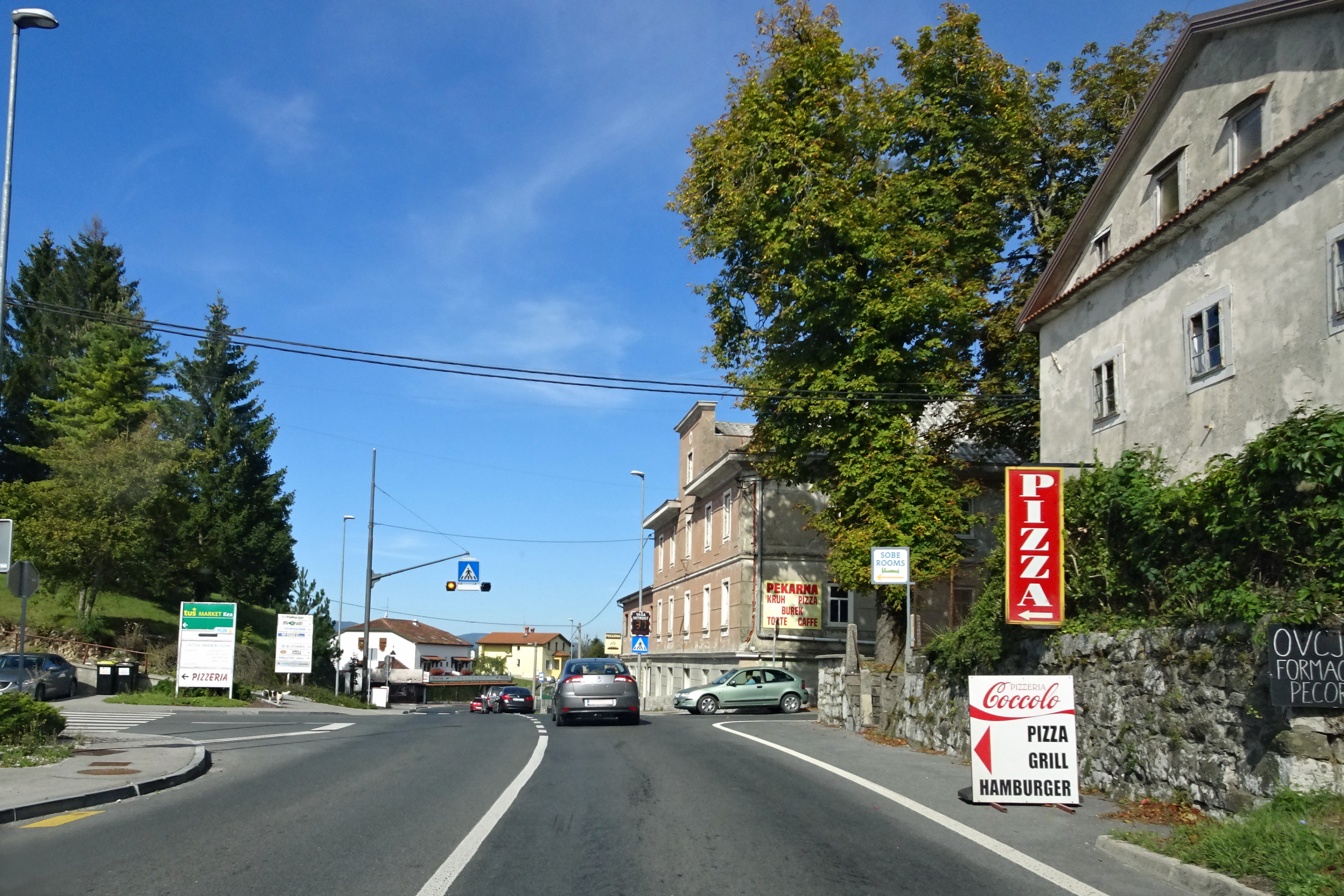
- Podgrad in 2018

- Location in Slovenia
- Coordinates: 45°31′20.24″N 14°8′34.29″E
- Country: Slovenia
- Traditional region: Inner Carniola
- Statistical region: Littoral–Inner Carniola
- Municipality: Ilirska Bistrica

Area
  - Total: 12.6 km^{2} (4.9 sq mi)
- Elevation: 548.3 m (1,799 ft)

Population (2002)
  - Total: 607

Podgrad (pronounced [pɔdˈɡɾáːt, ˈpɔ̀ːdɡɾat]; Italian: Castelnuovo; German: Neuhaus) is a village southwest of Ilirska Bistrica in the Inner Carniola region of Slovenia, close to the border with Croatia.

== Clandestine grave ==
Podgrad is the site of a clandestine grave from the end of the Second World War. The Cemetery Grave (Slovene: Grobišče na pokopališču) is located in the village cemetery and contains the remains of a German soldier from the 97th Corps that fell at the beginning of May 1945. Its exact location is unknown.

== Churches ==
The parish church in the settlement is dedicated to Saints Cyril and Methodius and belongs to the Koper Diocese. There is a second church in the settlement dedicated to Saint James.

== Notable people ==
Notable people that were born or lived in Podgrad include:

- Radovan Gobec (1909–1995), composer
