= Mihele =

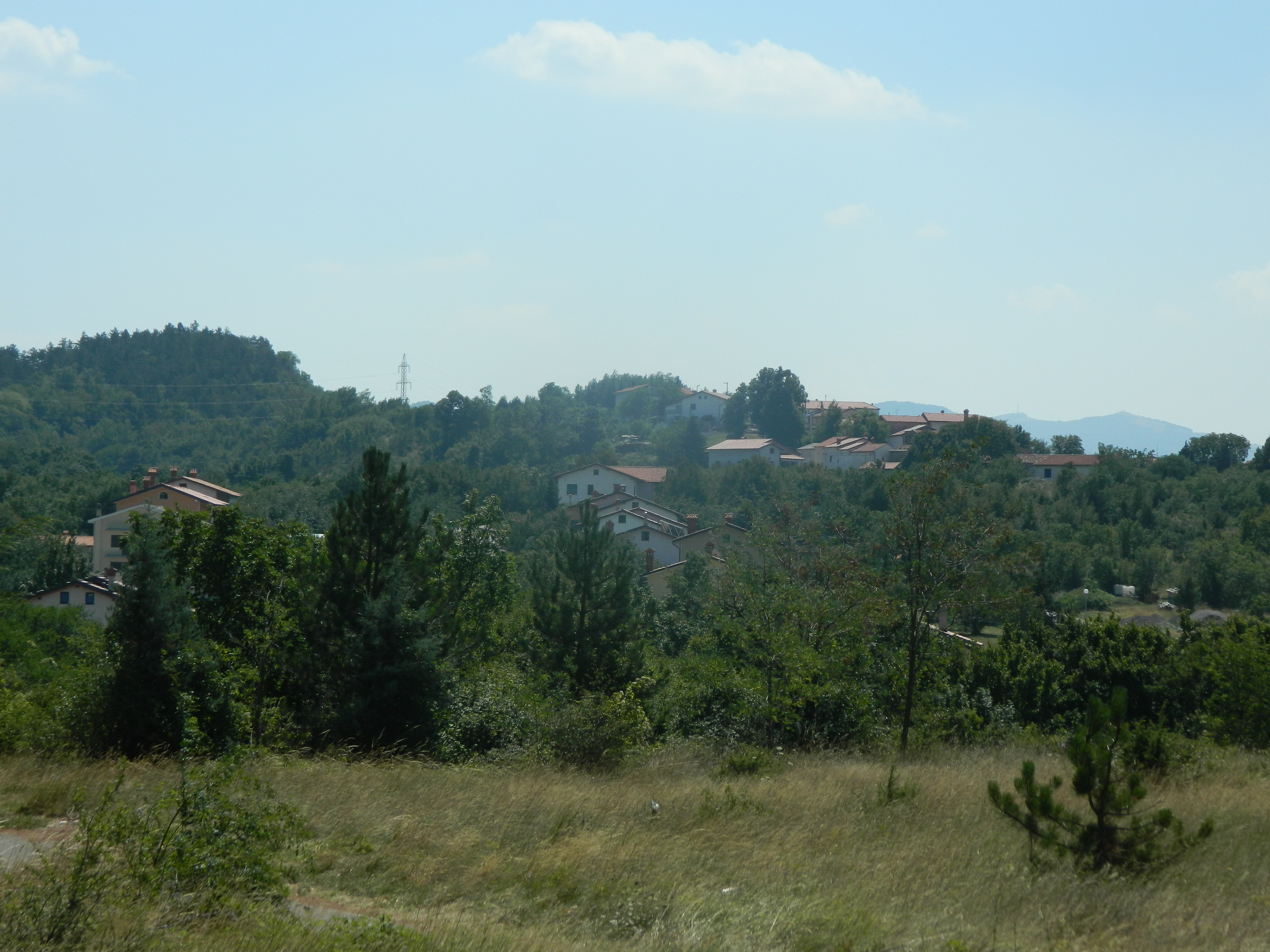

- Location in Slovenia
- Coordinates: 45°36′51.97″N 13°54′24.4″E
- Country: Slovenia
- Traditional region: Littoral
- Statistical region: Coastal–Karst
- Municipality: Hrpelje-Kozina

Area
  - Total: 1.3 km^{2} (0.50 sq mi)
- Elevation: 424.8 m (1,394 ft)

Population (2002)
  - Total: 26

Mihele (pronounced [miˈxeːlɛ]; in older sources Miheli, Italian: Micheli) is a small settlement in the Municipality of Hrpelje-Kozina in the Littoral region of Slovenia on the border with Italy.

The parish church just outside the settlement is dedicated to the Prophet Elijah. The parish is known as the Draga Parish, although the actual village of Draga (obsolete Italian: Draga Santa Elia or Draga Sant'Elia) is now on the Italian side of the border. It belongs to the Koper Diocese.
