= Servulus of Rome =

Italian Roman Catholic saint

Saint Servulus the Paralysed
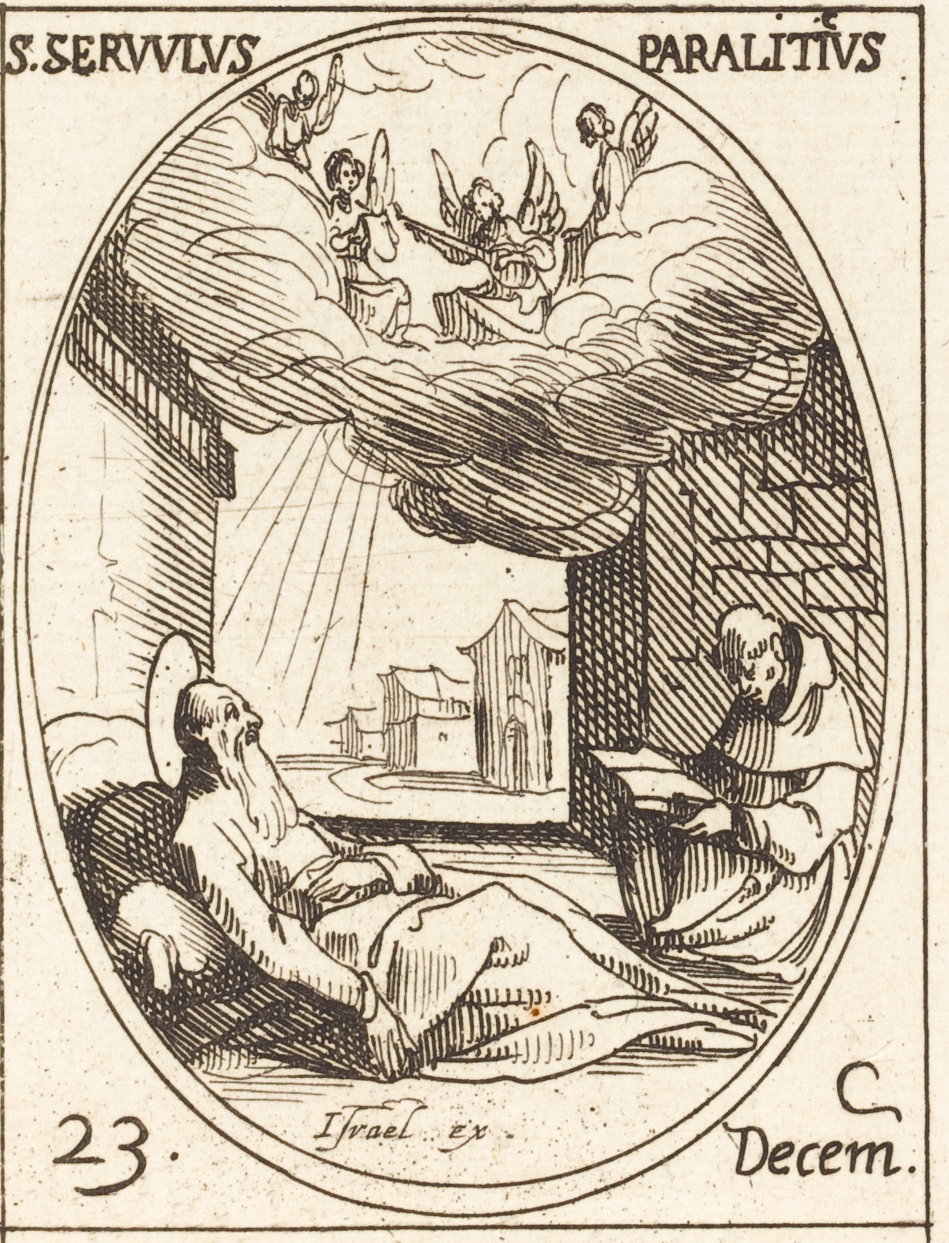
- Servulus by Jacques Callot (1592–1635)
- Born: 6th century Rome, Italy
- Died: c. 590; Rome
- Feast: 23 December

Saint Servulus (or Servolo, died c. 590) was a paralyzed beggar who spent all his time praying outside Saint Clement's Church in Rome. His feast day is 23 December.

== Roman Martyrology ==
The Roman Martyrology of 1916 has an entry under the Twenty-third Day of December,

At Rome, blessed Servulus, of whom St. Gregory writes, that a paralytic from his early years to the end of his life, he remained lying in a porch near St. Clement's Church, and being invited by the chant of angels, he went to enjoy the glory of Paradise. At his tomb, frequent miracles are wrought by Almighty God.

== Monks of Ramsgate account ==
The Monks of Ramsgate wrote in their Book of Saints (1921),

Servulus (St.) (Dec. 23)
(6th cent.) A holy man who, paralysed all his life long, passed his days in prayer in the porch of the church of Saint Clement in Rome. When the hour of his death arrived he bade those surrounding him to cease from their chant of Psalms, as he already heard their words taken up by the Angels in Heaven. Saint Gregory the Great describes the scene in one of his Homilies, and seems to have known Saint Servulus personally.

== Butler's account ==
The hagiographer Alban Butler (1710–1773) wrote in his Lives of the Fathers, Martyrs, and Other Principal Saints under 21 February,

23 December

St. Servulus, C.
From St. Gregory, Hom. 25, in Evangel. and Dial. l. 4, c. 14.
A.D. 590.

IN this saint was exemplified what our divine Redeemer has taught us of Lazarus, the poor man full of sores, who lay before the gate of the rich man’s house. Servulus was a beggar, and had been afflicted with the palsy from his infancy; so that he was never able to stand, sit upright, lift his hand to his mouth, or turn himself from one side to another. His mother and brother carried him into the porch of St. Clement’s church at Rome, where he lived on the alms of those that passed by. Whatever he could spare from his own subsistence he distributed among other needy persons.

The sufferings and humiliation of his condition were a means of which he made the most excellent use for the sanctification of his own soul, by the constant exercise of humility patience, meekness, resignation, and penance. He used to entreat devout persons to read the holy scriptures, and he heard them with such attention, as to learn them by heart. His time he consecrated by assiduously singing hymns of praise and thanksgiving to God, and his continual pains were so far from dejecting or distracting him, that they proved a most pressing motive for raising his mind to God with greater ardour.

After several years thus spent, his distemper having seized his vitals, he perceived his end to draw near. In his last moments he desired the poor and pilgrims, who had often shared in his charity, to sing sacred hymns and psalms by him. Whilst he joined his voice with theirs, he on a sudden cried out: “Silence; do you not hear the sweet melody and praises which resound in the heavens!” Soon after he had spoken those words he expired, and his soul was carried by angels into everlasting bliss, about the year 590. The body of St. Servulus was buried in St. Clement’s church, and honoured with miracles, according to the Roman Martyrology.

St. Gregory the Great concludes the account he gives of him in a sermon to his people, by observing that the whole behaviour of this poor sick beggar loudly condemns those who, when blessed with good health and a plentiful fortune, neither do good works, nor suffer the least cross with tolerable patience.

== Sources ==
- Butler, Alban (1846), The Lives of the Fathers, Martyrs, and Other Principal Saints, vol. X, New York: D. & J. Sadlier This article incorporates text from this source, which is in the public domain.
- Gibbons, Cardinal, ed. (1916), The Roman martyrology, Baltimore: John Murphy This article incorporates text from this source, which is in the public domain.
- St. Augustine's Abbey, Ramsgate (1921). The Book of saints : a dictionary of servants of God canonized by the Catholic Church. London: A. & C. Black, ltd. OCLC 671676136. This article incorporates text from this source, which is in the public domain.
