= Golac =

- Location in Slovenia
- Coordinates: 45°30′53.51″N 14°3′48.41″E
- Country: Slovenia
- Traditional region: Littoral
- Statistical region: Coastal–Karst
- Municipality: Hrpelje-Kozina

Area
  - Total: 24.21 km^{2} (9.35 sq mi)
- Elevation: 643.1 m (2,110 ft)

Population (2002)
  - Total: 75

Golac (pronounced [ˈɡoːlats]; Italian: Golazzo) is a village in the Municipality of Hrpelje-Kozina in the Littoral region of Slovenia on the border with Croatia.

== Church ==
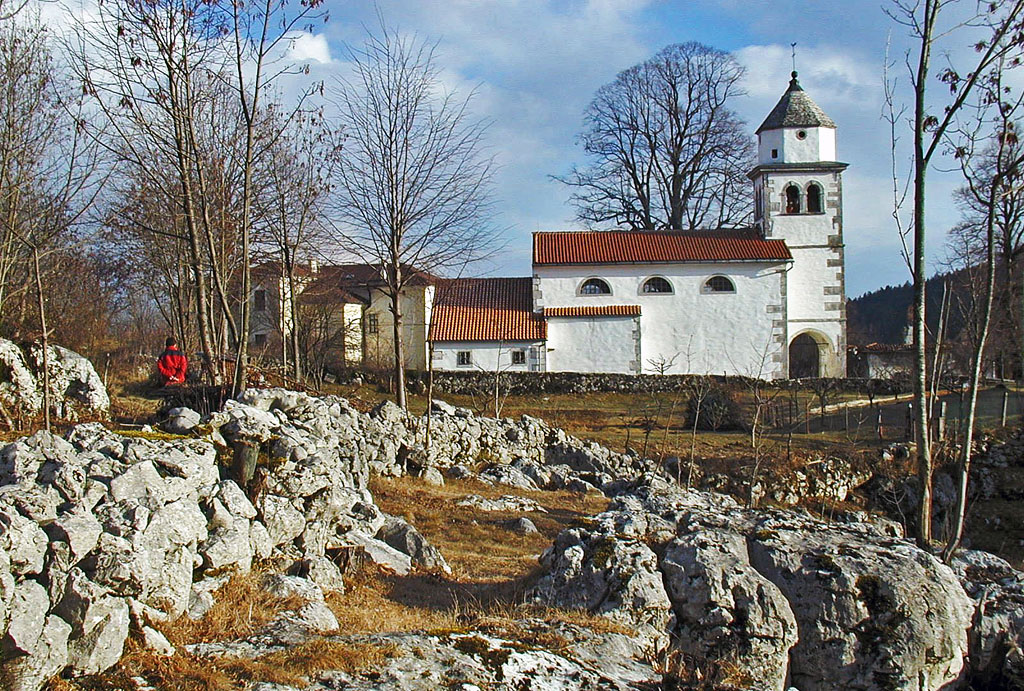
Saint Nicholas's Church

The parish church in the settlement is dedicated to Saint Nicholas and belongs to the Koper Diocese.
