= Hrpelje =

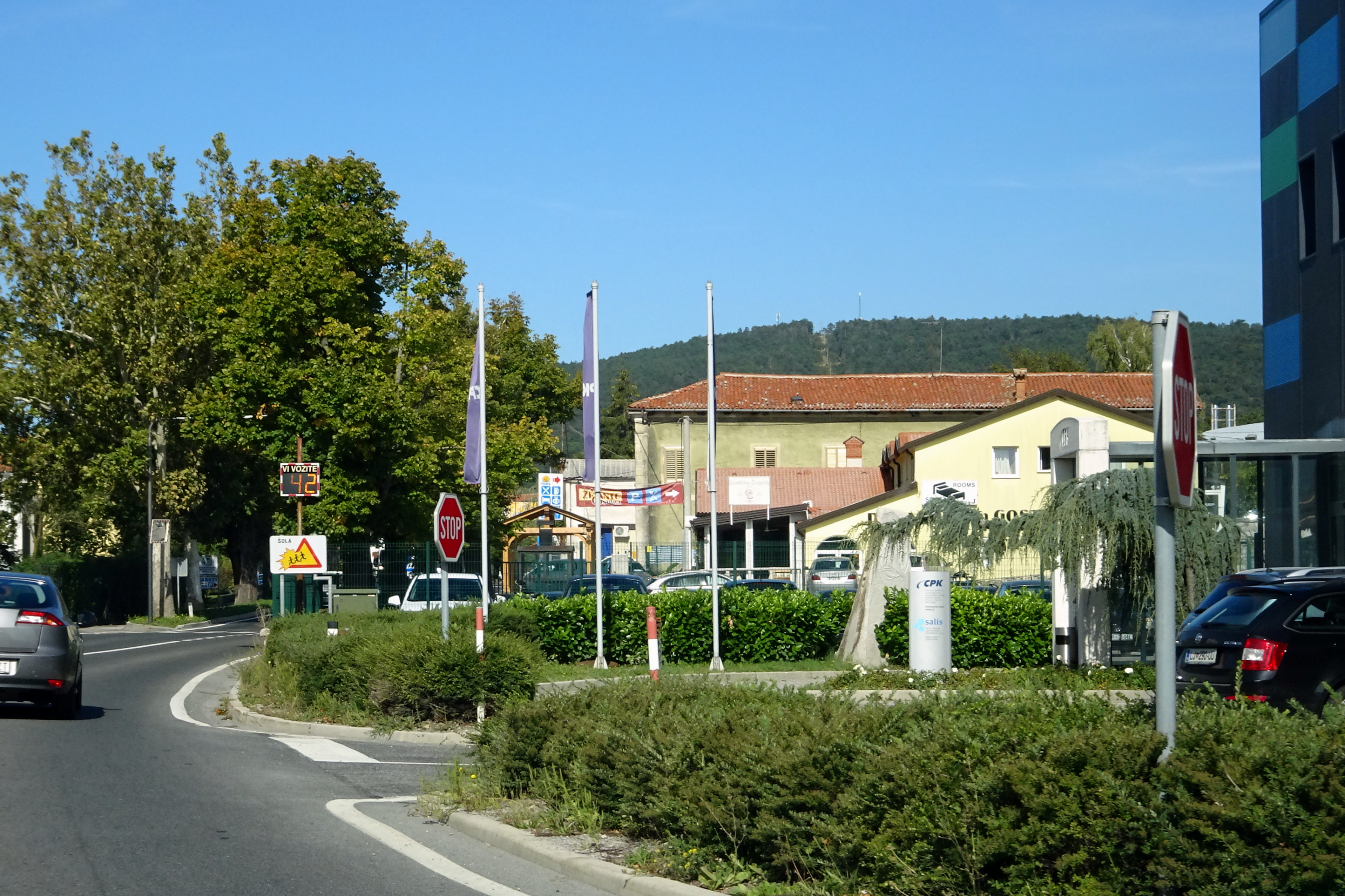

- Coat of arms

- Location in Slovenia
- Coordinates: 45°36′11.24″N 13°56′51.94″E
- Country: Slovenia
- Traditional region: Littoral
- Statistical region: Coastal–Karst
- Municipality: Hrpelje-Kozina

Area
  - Total: 5.42 km^{2} (2.09 sq mi)
- Elevation: 502 m (1,647 ft)

Population (2002)
  - Total: 665

Hrpelje (pronounced [xəɾˈpeːljɛ], in older sources Herpelje; Italian: Erpelle) is a settlement in the Municipality of Hrpelje-Kozina in the Littoral region of Slovenia. It is the administrative center of the municipality.

== Geography ==
Hrpelje is located in a heavily karstified area with many sinkholes, depressions, and shafts. Among them is the Hrpelje Sinkhole (Slovene: Hrpeljski dol) or Church Sinkhole (Slovene: Cerkveni dol) on the western edge of the village. It is 94 meters (308 ft) deep, and until 1949 its 6,000-square-meter (65,000 sq ft) bottom was divided into 29 fields cultivated by 19 smallholders, who mainly grew cabbage and potatoes on the plots. Under the postwar communist regime, the land was assigned to the Hrpelje Collective Farm (Slovene: Kmetijska zadruga Hrpelje).

== Name ==
Hrpelje was attested in historical sources as Herpelie and Herpelye in 1763–1787. The name may be derived from the plural demonym *Vьrpeľane based on the common noun *vьrpa 'sinkhole', thus originally meaning 'people living near a sinkhole'. If so, the initial H- is prothetic.

== Church ==
The parish church in the settlement is dedicated to Saint Anthony the Hermit and belongs to the Koper Diocese.
