= Brezovica, Hrpelje-Kozina =

Brezovica
- Village
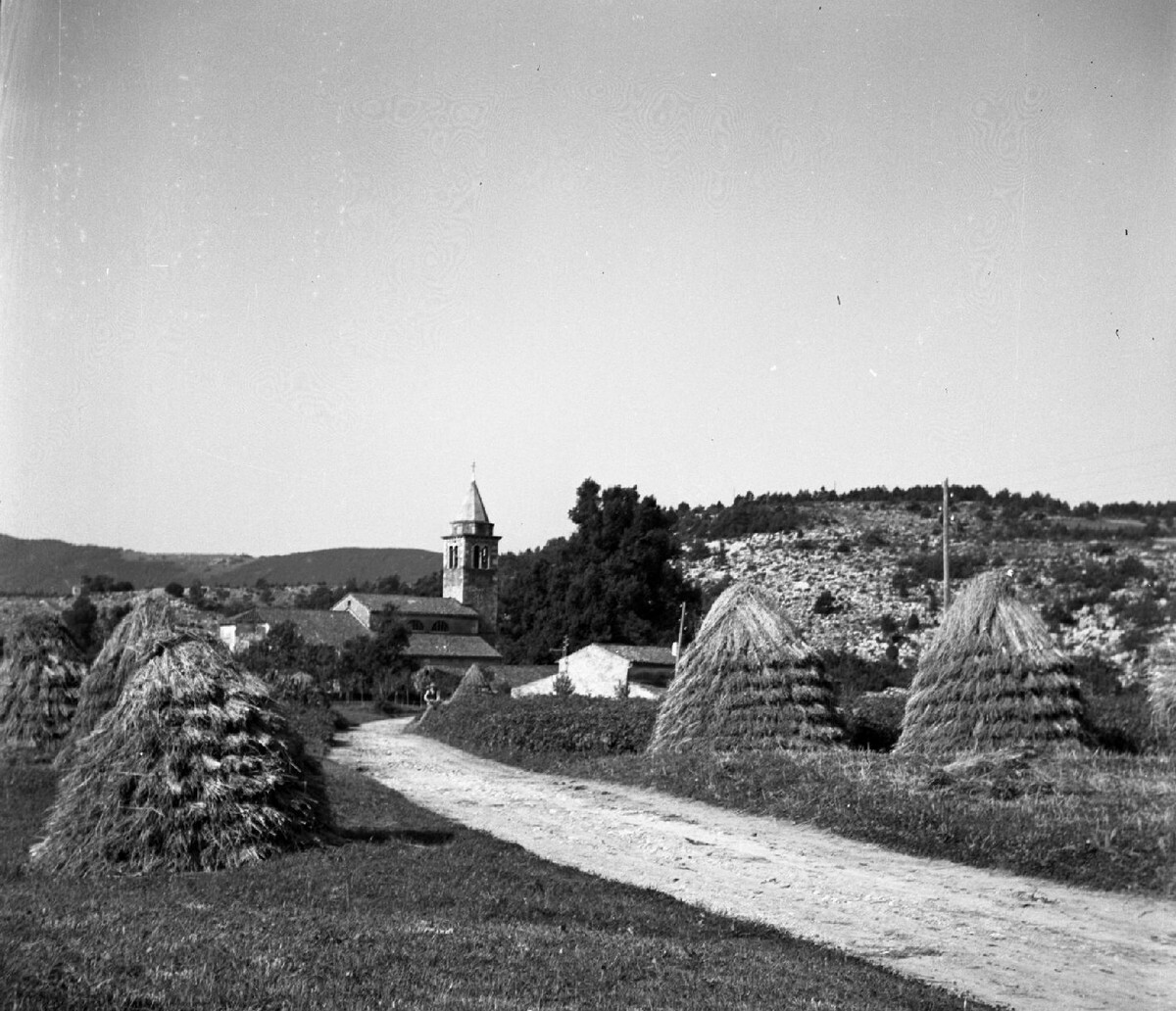
- Brezovica in 1955

- Location in Slovenia
- Coordinates: 45°36′6.23″N 14°0′11.86″E
- Country: Slovenia
- Traditional region: Littoral
- Statistical region: Coastal–Karst
- Municipality: Hrpelje-Kozina

Area
  - Total: 3.17 km^{2} (1.22 sq mi)
- Elevation: 522.9 m (1,716 ft)

Population (2002)
  - Total: 86

Brezovica (pronounced [ˈbɾéːzɔʋitsa]; Italian: Bresovizza) is a village in the Municipality of Hrpelje-Kozina in the Littoral region of Slovenia.

The local parish church, built to the south just outside the settlement, is dedicated to Saint Stephen and belongs to the Koper Diocese.
