= Klanec pri Kozini =

- Location in Slovenia
- Coordinates: 45°35′35.85″N 13°55′33.7″E
- Country: Slovenia
- Traditional region: Littoral
- Statistical region: Coastal–Karst
- Municipality: Hrpelje-Kozina

Area
  - Total: 3.35 km^{2} (1.29 sq mi)
- Elevation: 411.8 m (1,351 ft)

Population (2014)
  - Total: 124

Klanec pri Kozini (pronounced [ˈklaːnəts pɾi kɔˈziːni]) is a settlement south of Kozina in the Municipality of Hrpelje-Kozina in the Littoral region of Slovenia.

== Name ==
The name of the settlement was changed from Klanec to Klanec pri Kozini in 1953.

== Church ==
The parish church in the settlement is dedicated to Saint Peter and belongs to the Koper Diocese.
