= Slivje, Hrpelje-Kozina =

Slivje
- Village
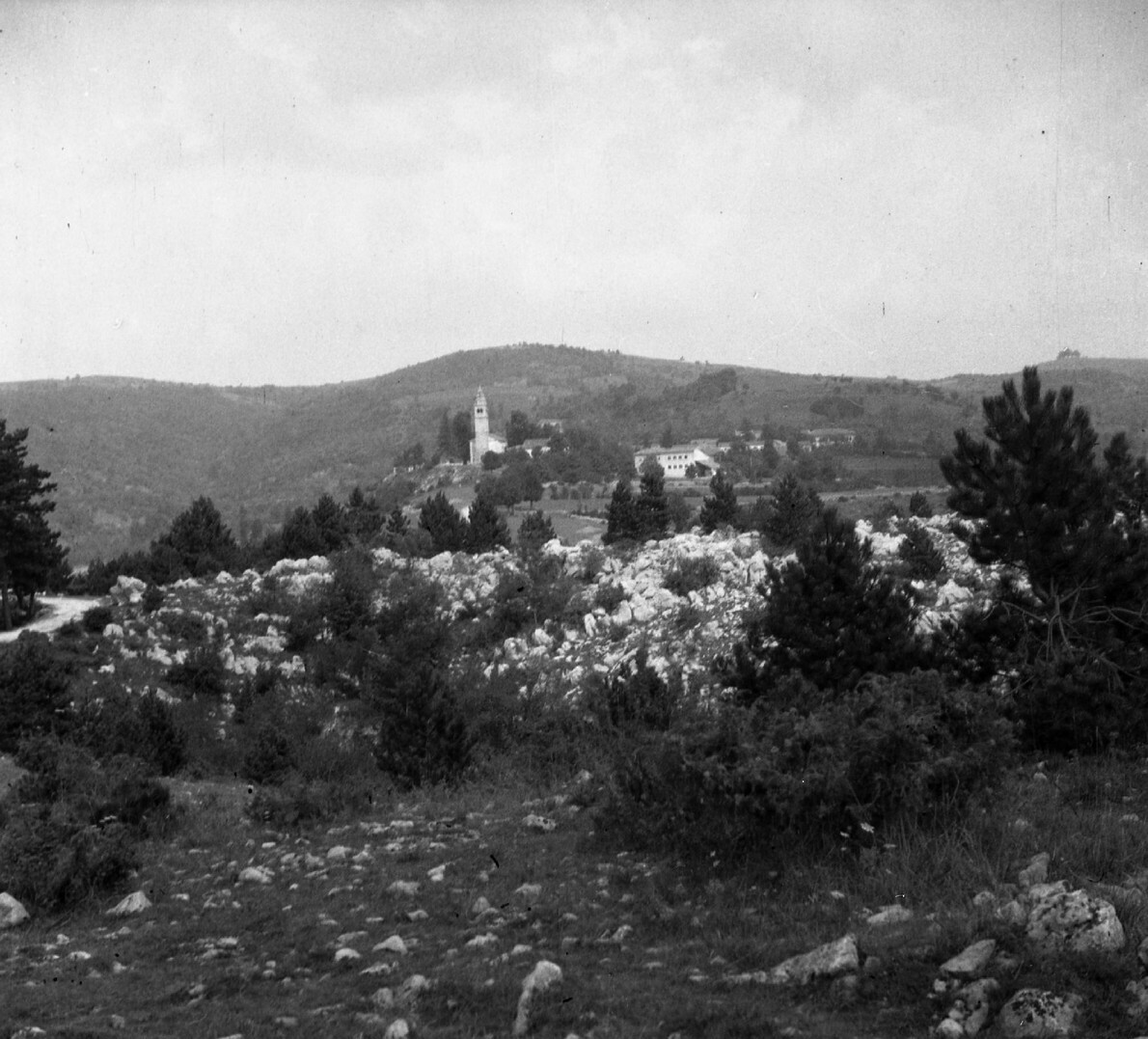
- Slivje in 1955

- Location in Slovenia
- Coordinates: 45°34′17.76″N 14°2′50.6″E
- Country: Slovenia
- Traditional region: Littoral
- Statistical region: Coastal–Karst
- Municipality: Hrpelje-Kozina

Area
  - Total: 3.32 km^{2} (1.28 sq mi)
- Elevation: 583.9 m (1,916 ft)

Population (2002)
  - Total: 108

Slivje (pronounced [ˈsliːu̯jɛ]; Italian: Slivia) is a village in the Municipality of Hrpelje-Kozina in the Littoral region of Slovenia close to the border with Croatia.

The parish church in the settlement is dedicated to Saint Martin and belongs to the diocese of Koper.
