= Slovene Riviera =

Coastline of Slovenia

Coordinates: 45°33′N 13°44′E

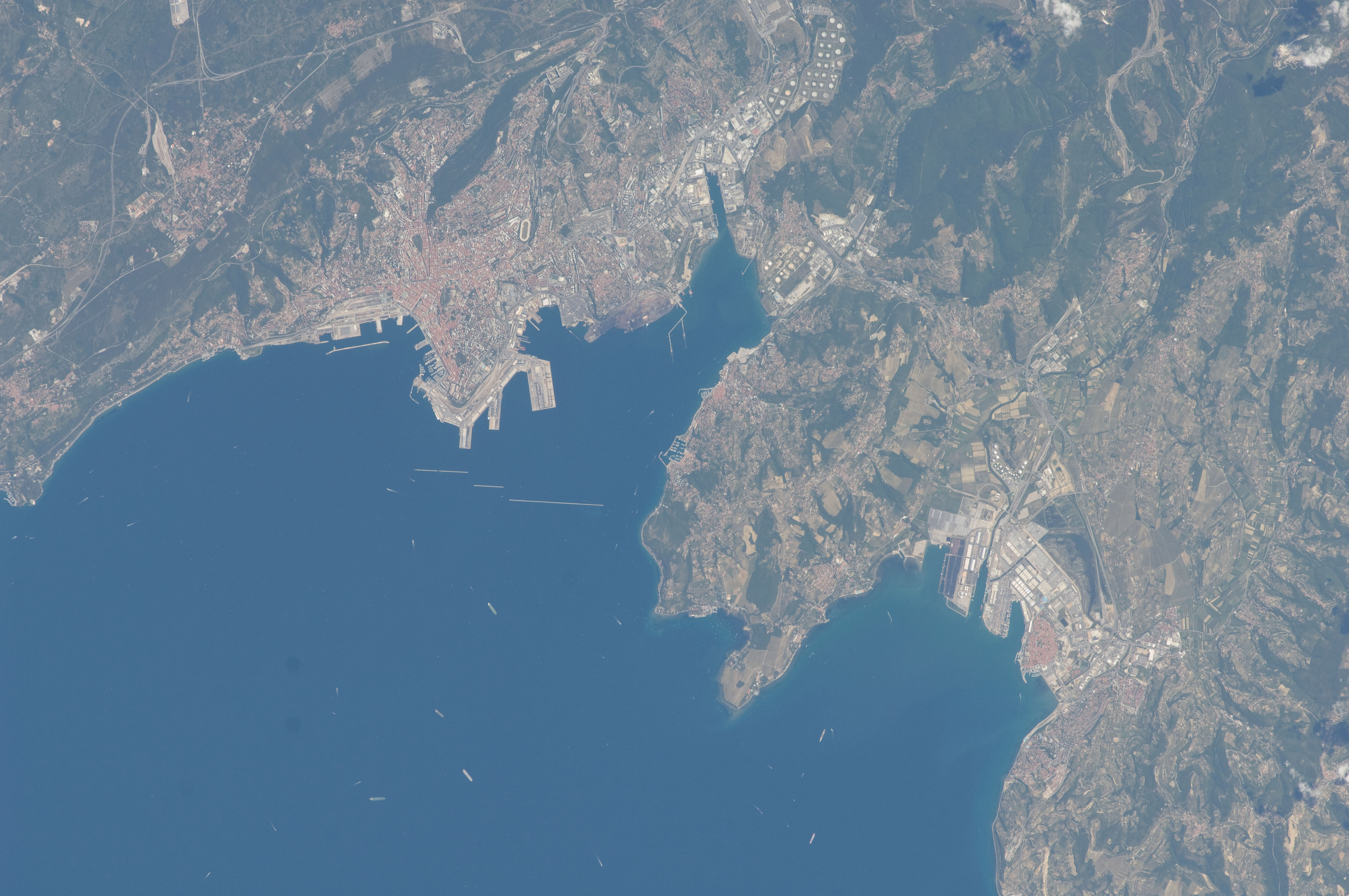
Satellite image of Trieste and its gulf

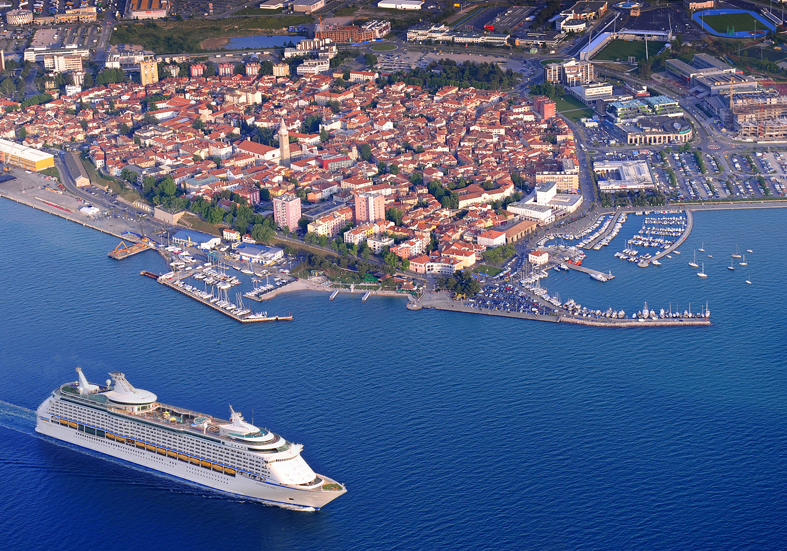
Koper

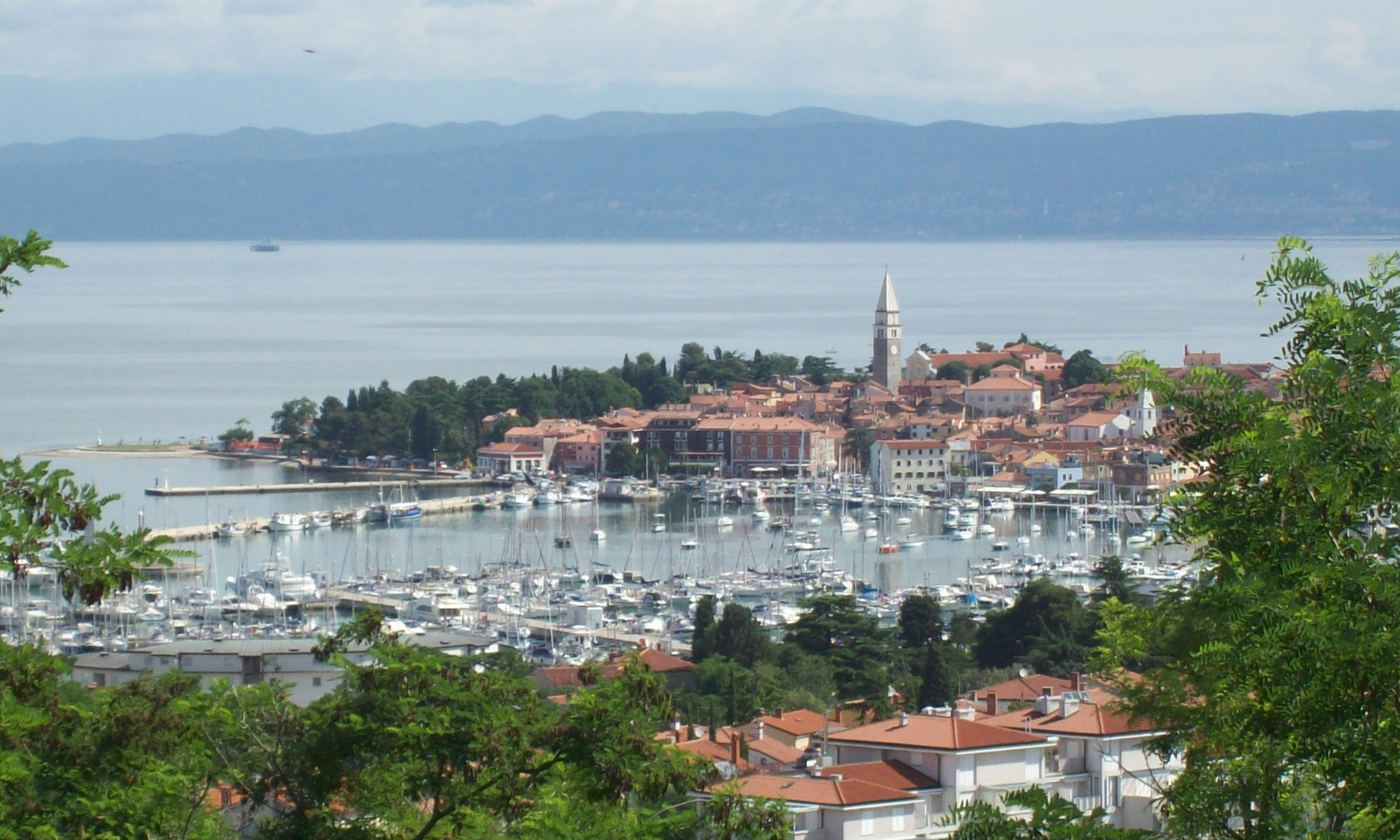
Izola

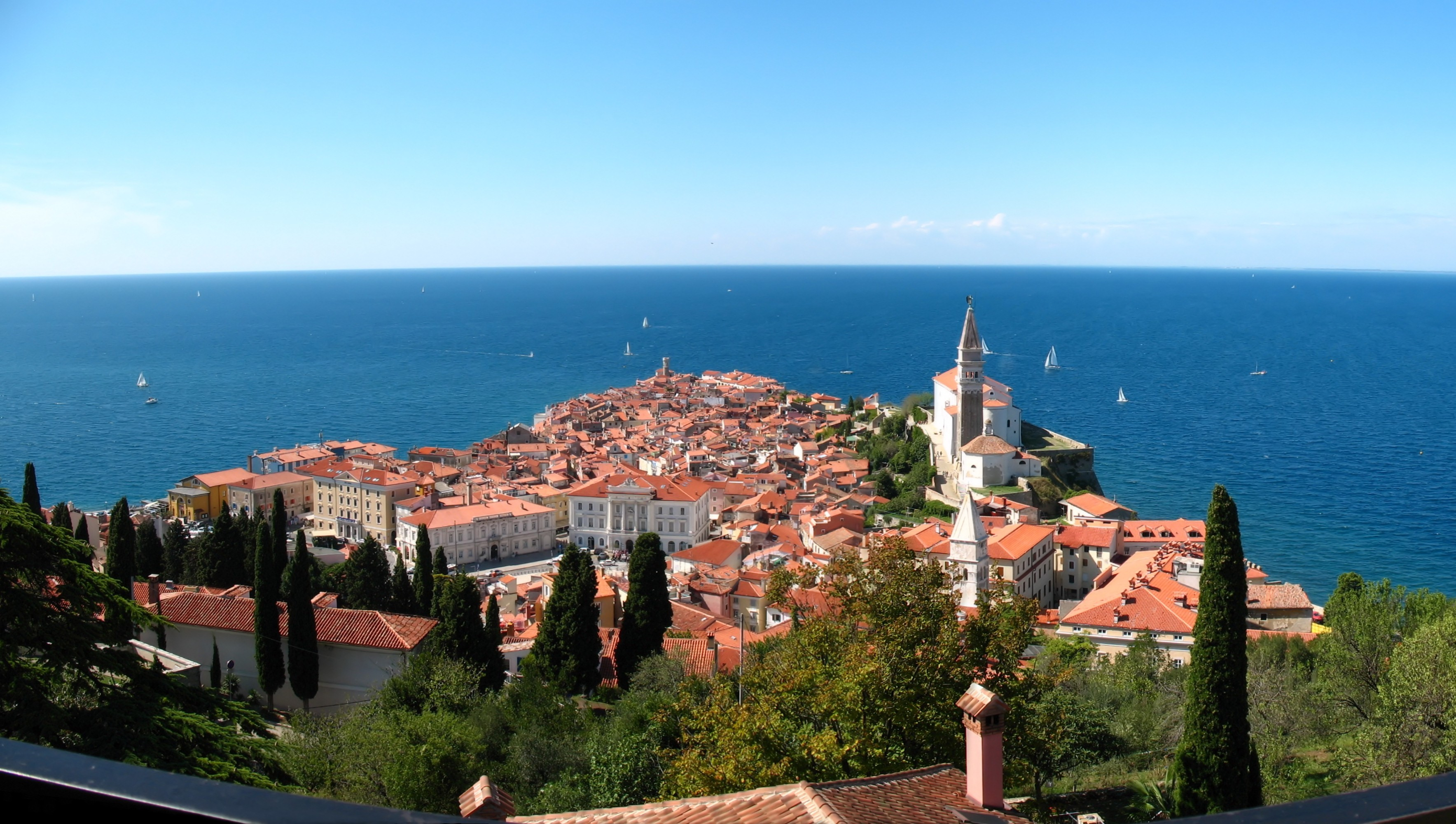
Piran

The Slovene Riviera (Slovene: Slovenska obala) is the coastline of Slovenia, located on the Gulf of Trieste, by the Adriatic Sea. It is part of the Istrian peninsula and is 46.6 km long. The region comprises the towns of Koper and Piran with Portorož, and the municipality of Izola. It is a seaside tourist destination, with a vibrant multiethnic Roman, Venetian, Austrian, Italian and Slovenian heritage.

== Geography ==
Located in Slovene Istria, the Riviera belongs to the Coastal–Karst Statistical Region and to the historical region of the Austrian Littoral. It is bordered to the north by Italy and to the south by Croatia. The northernmost point is the headland of Debeli Rtič, by the Gulf of Koper; and the southernmost one is the village of Sečovlje, by the Gulf of Piran, located close the Sečovlje Salina Nature Park.

The 14 settlements on the coast, divided by municipality, are:

- Ankaran (Italian: Ancarano).
- Koper (Italian: Capodistria): with Bertoki (Italian: Bertocchi).
- Izola (Italian: Isola): with Dobrava and Jagodje.
- Piran (Italian: Pirano): with Fiesa, Lucija, Parecag, Portorož (Italian: Portorose), Seča, Sečovlje, and Strunjan.

== Transport ==
The coastline counts the ports of Koper, Izola, Piran, Lucija, and Portorož. Koper railway station is the terminus of the Divača–Koper Railway and Portorož Airport is located near Sečovlje, close to Croatian borders. Main road serving the Riviera is the national road 111, which joins the A1 motorway (to Ljubljana and Maribor) at Koper.

== See also ==
- Riviera
- Dragonja River
- Gulf of Venice
