= Sečovlje Saltworks =

Saltworks in Slovenia

Coordinates: 45°29′20.91″N 13°36′11.28″E

Designations

Ramsar Wetland
- Official name: Sečoveljske soline
- Designated: 28 October 1992
- Reference no.: 586

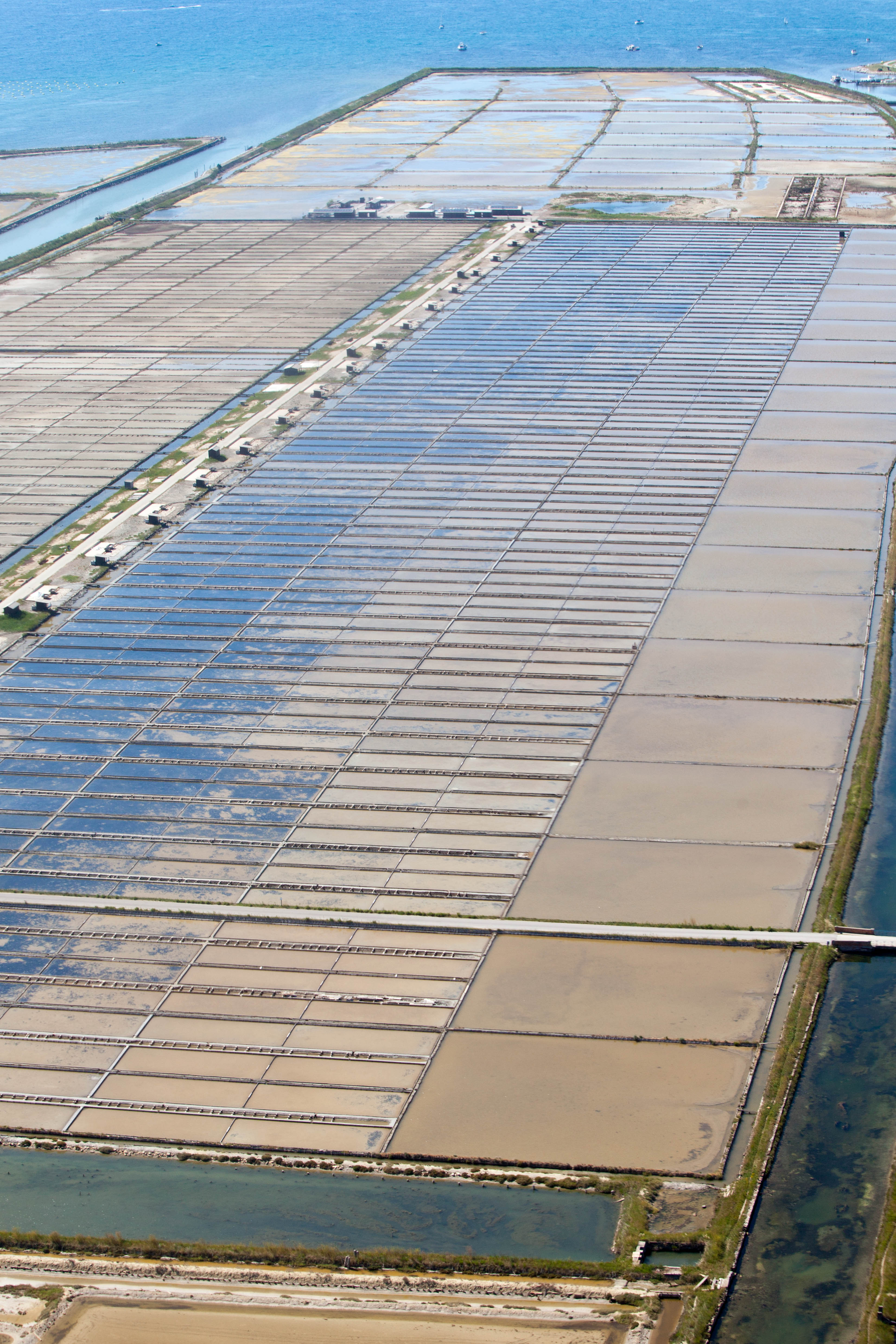
Sečovlje Saltworks

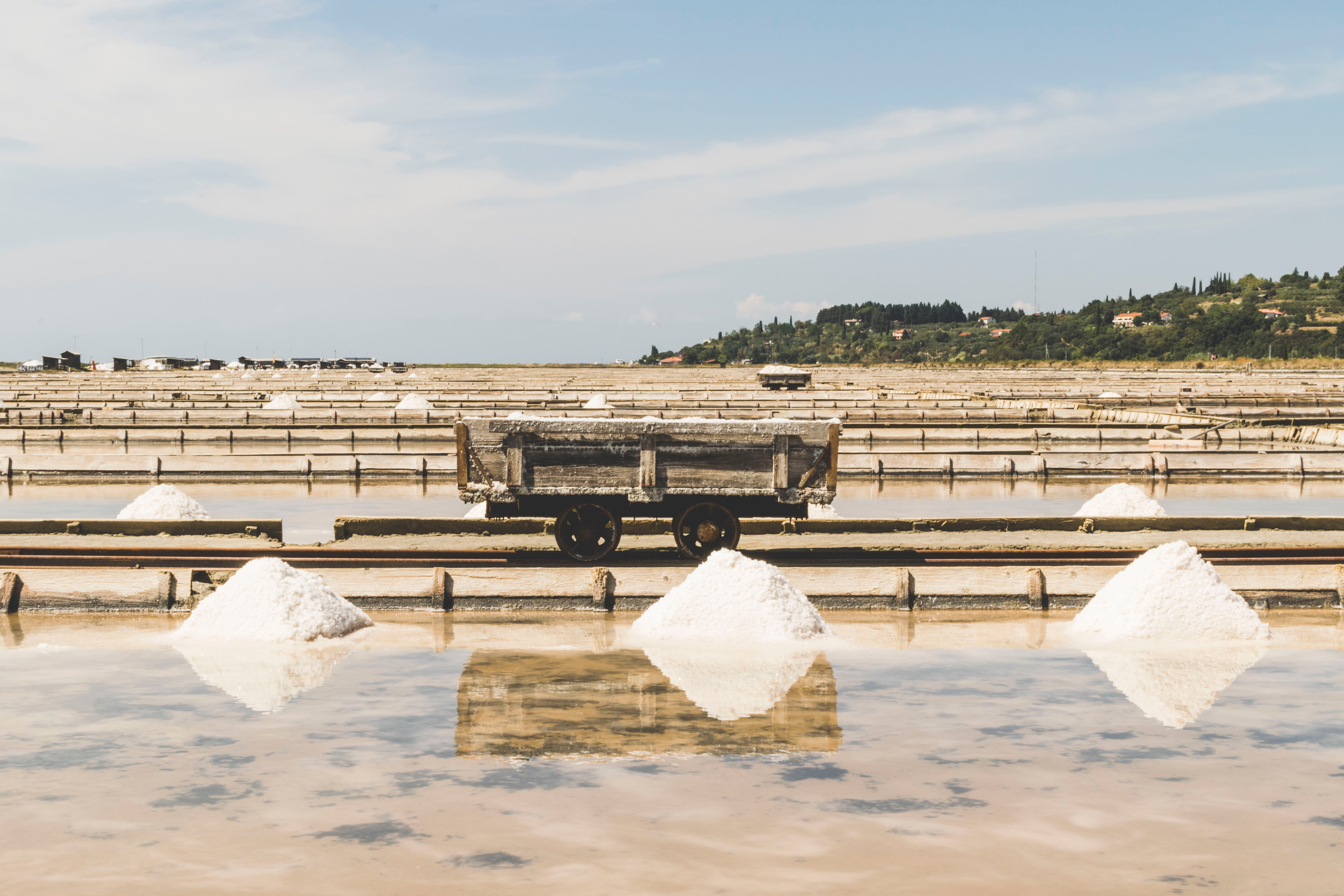
Sečovlje Saltworks

The Sečovlje Saltworks (Slovene: Sečoveljske soline; Italian: Saline di Sicciole) is the largest Slovenian salt evaporation pond. Along with the Strunjan Saltworks, they are the northernmost Mediterranean saltworks and one of the few where salt is still produced in a traditional way, as well as a wetland of international importance and a breeding place for waterbirds. They are part of the Piran Saltworks and are located at Parecag in Slovenian Istria, the southwest of the country, at the Adriatic Sea, along the mouth of the Dragonja River near Sečovlje.

The saltworks have been active since the 13th century. Nowadays, the salt production is carried on in order to preserve natural and cultural heritage. The area of the saltworks and the Seča peninsula have been declared the Sečovlje Salina Landscape Park. The Museum of Salt-Making in Sečovlje received the Europa Nostra Prize, bestowed by the European Union to outstanding initiatives for the preservation of cultural heritage in 2003, the first Slovene organisation to be awarded. The salt produced at the saltworks is marketed as Piran Salt (Slovene: Piranska sol) and has Protected designation of origin status in the European Union.

In 1993, the saltworks were put on the list of Ramsar wetlands of international importance. The wetland covers 650 hectares (1,600 acres) in the mouth of the Dragonja.

== Flora ==
Of particular importance are halophytes - the plants that require high salt concentrations for growing - among them Salicornia europea, Arthrochnemum fruticosum, Halimione portulacoides, Limonium angustifolium, Artemisia caerulescens, Suaeda maritima, and the golden samphire (Inula crithmoides).

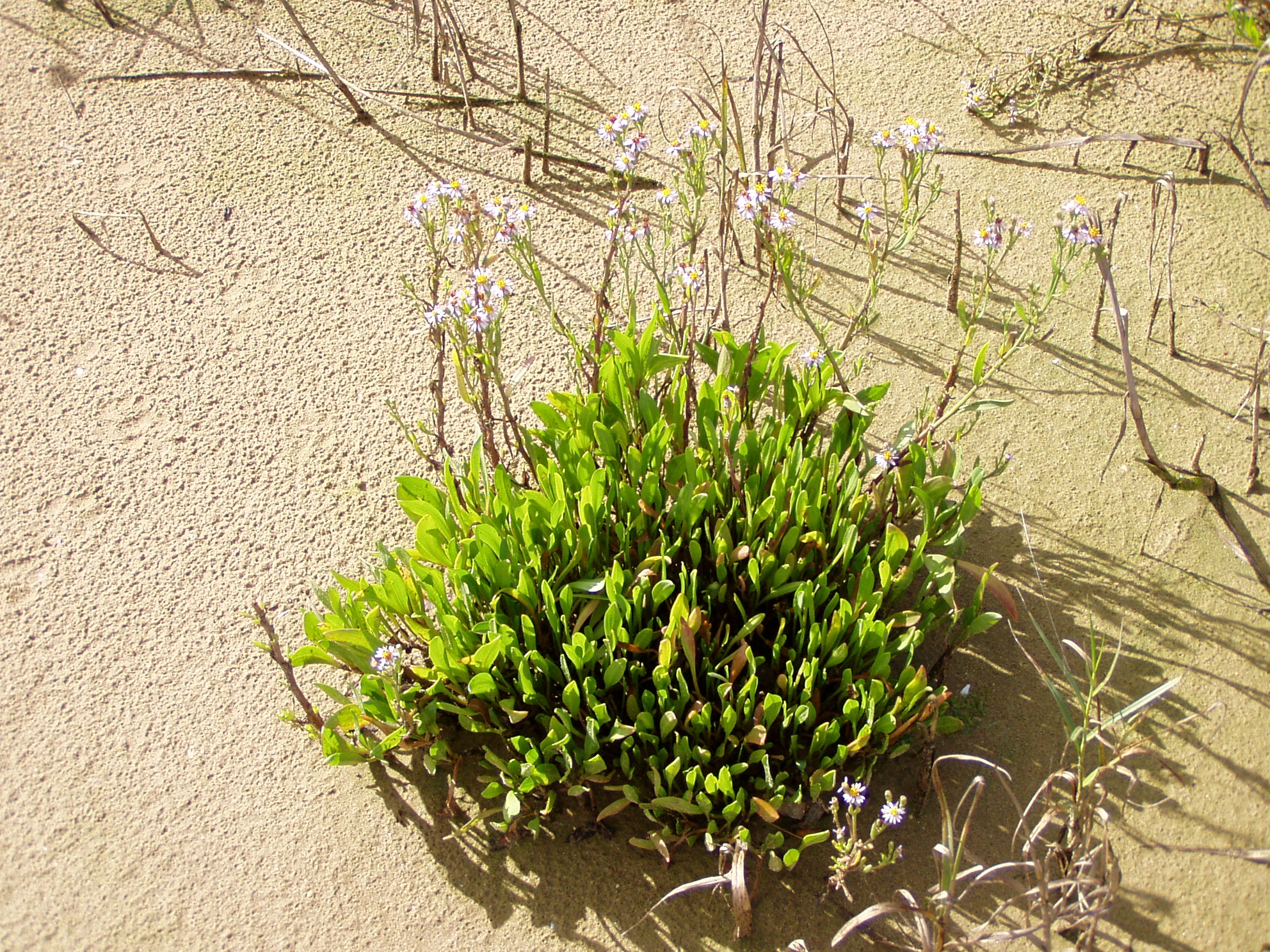
Limonium angustifolium

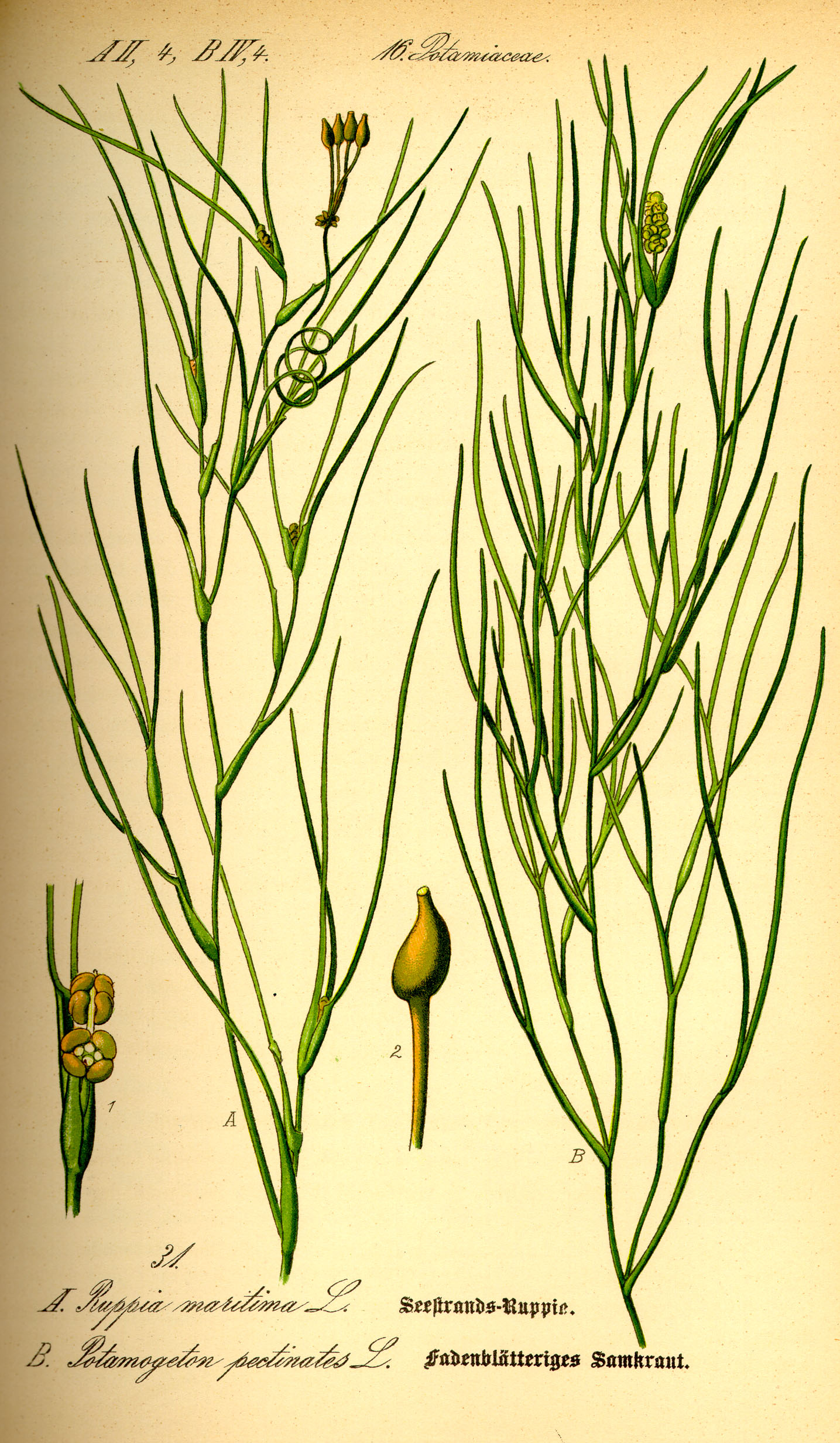
Ruppia maritima grows in closed channels with deeper and salt water.

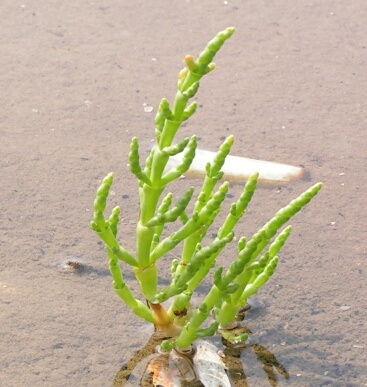
Occasionally, the pioneer community of Salicornia europea covers a saltwork pool.

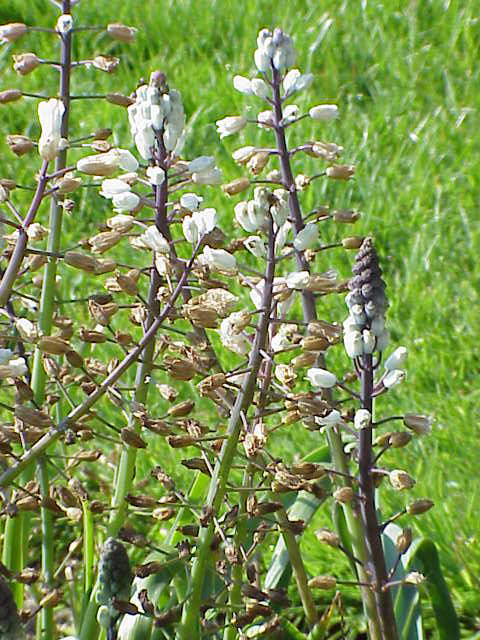
Sečovlje Saltworks are the only Slovenian growing place of Bellevalia romana

== Fauna ==
Over 280 bird species have been spotted in the Sečovlje Saltworks, at least four of them having their only nesting place here. The saltworks are home to numerous invertebrates, like shrimps and shells, and vertebrates. Among insects, the bee species Tetraloniella nana and Pseudoapis bispinosa, and the bug Dimorphopterus blissoides have been found in the Sečovlje Saltworks. Among vertebrates, the Etruscan shrew (Suncus etruscus), the Italian wall lizard (Podarcis sicula), and the lesser mouse-eared bat (Myotis blythii) live here.

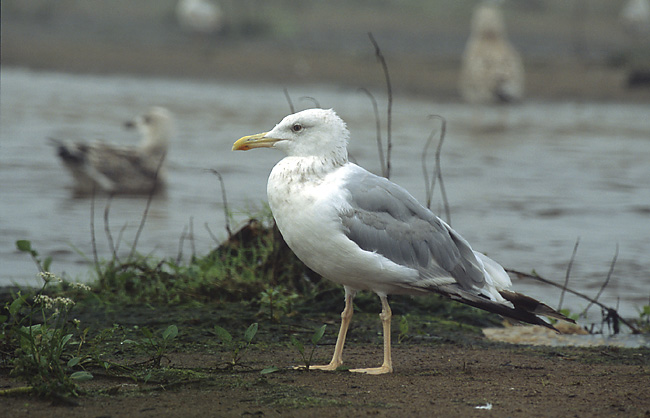
Yellow-legged gull (Larus michahellis)

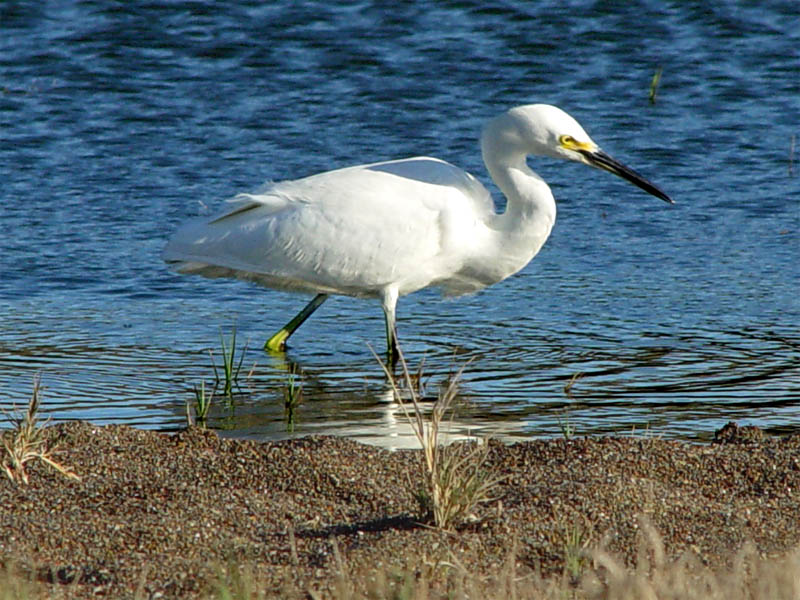
The little egret is the most common species of the egret and the symbol of the Sečovlje Saltworks.

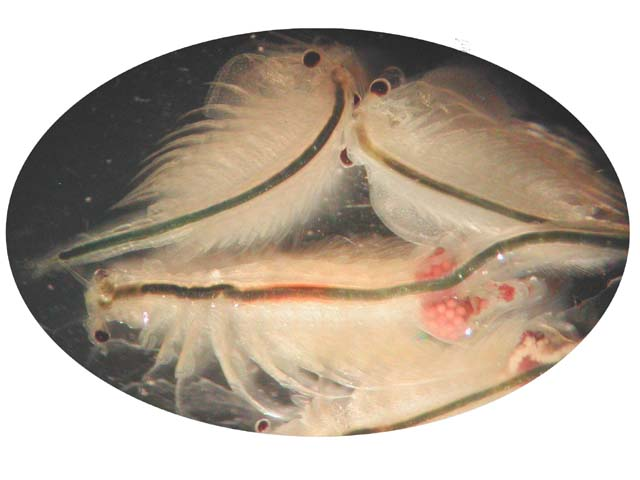
A number of water animals, for example the brine shrimp Artemia salina, live in the Sečovlje Saltworks.
