= Lucija Marina =

Coordinates: 45°30′18.3″N 13°35′49.19″E

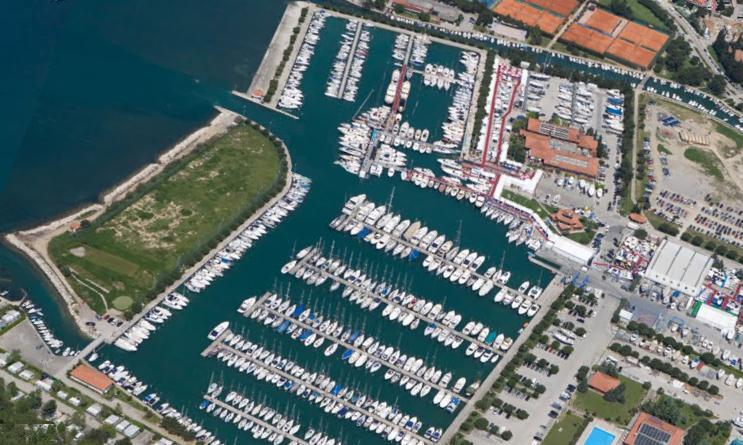
The Lucija Marina from the air

The Lucija Marina is a marina in the town of Lucija, on the Slovenian coast. Its official owner is the company Marina Portorož.

In 1996, the Lucija Marina and Studio 37, under the guidance of marina captain Marjan Matevljič and studio director Jurij Korenc, launched the Internautica boat show, the first of its kind in Slovenia. The annual event has become a major tourist attraction.
