= Nova Vas nad Dragonjo =

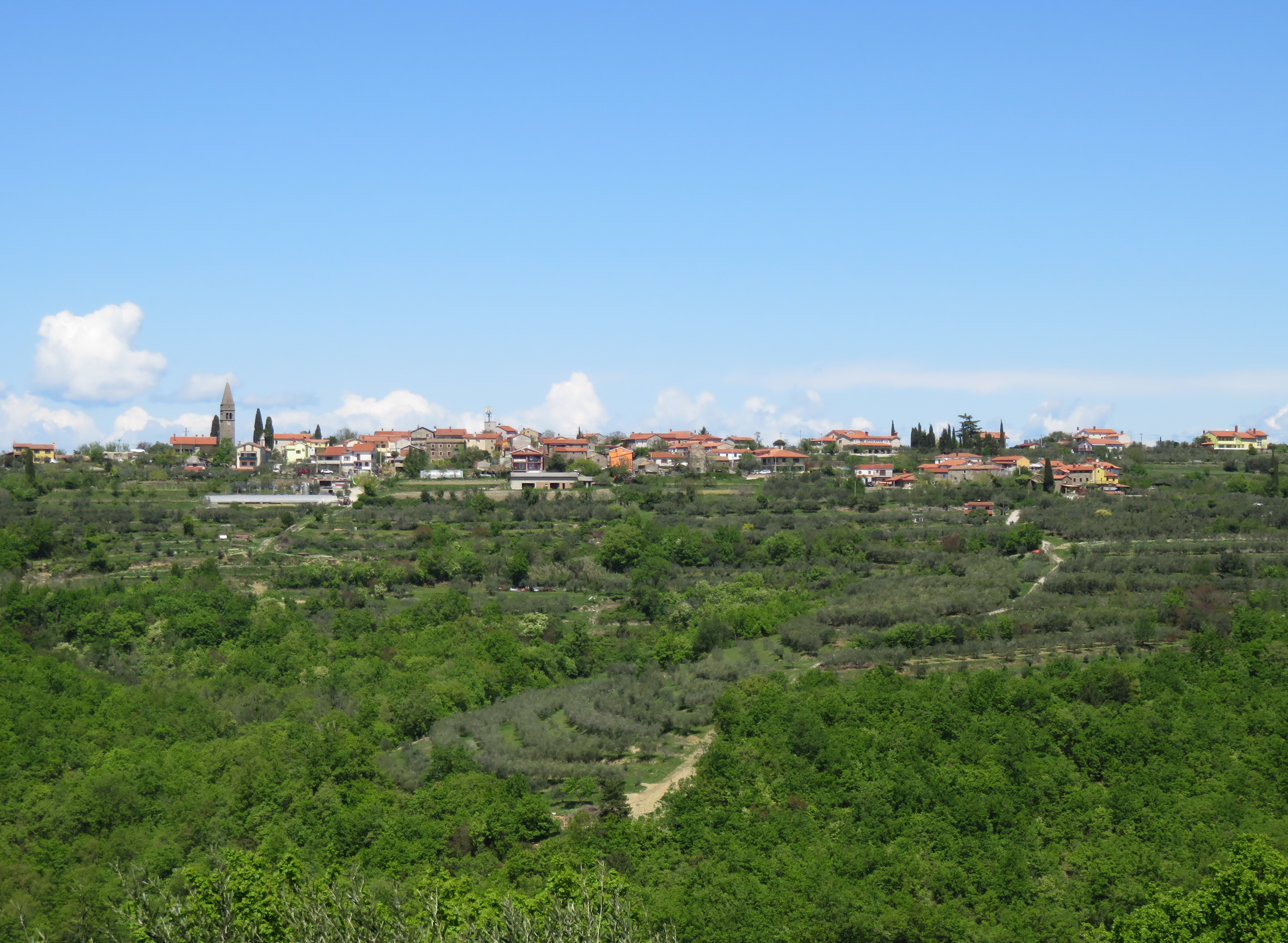

- Location in Slovenia
- Coordinates: 45°28′41.24″N 13°41′37.06″E
- Country: Slovenia
- Traditional region: Slovenian Littoral
- Statistical region: Coastal–Karst
- Municipality: Piran

Area
  - Total: 3.7 km^{2} (1.4 sq mi)
- Elevation: 270.8 m (888 ft)

Population (2002)
  - Total: 193

Nova Vas nad Dragonjo (pronounced [ˈnɔːʋa ˈʋaːs nad dɾaˈɡoːnjɔ]; Slovene: Nova vas nad Dragonjo, Italian: Villanova) is a village to the northeast above Dragonja in the Municipality of Piran in the Littoral region of Slovenia.

The local church is dedicated to Our Lady of the Rosary.
