= Koštabona =

Koštabona Costabona
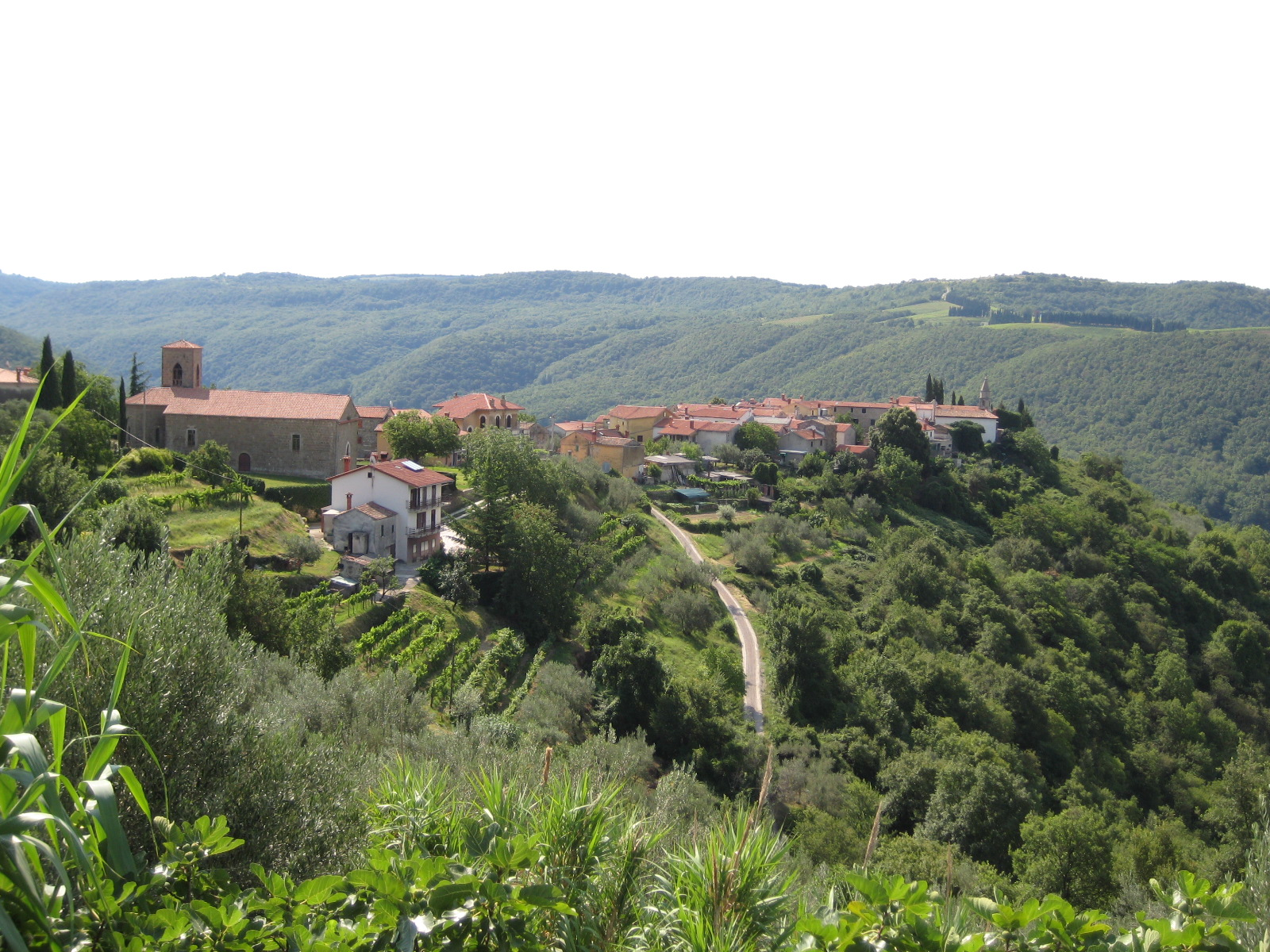

- Location in Slovenia
- Coordinates: 45°28′46.55″N 13°44′12.12″E
- Country: Slovenia
- Traditional region: Littoral
- Statistical region: Coastal–Karst
- Municipality: Koper

Area
  - Total: 3.52 km^{2} (1.36 sq mi)
- Elevation: 252.5 m (828 ft)

Population (2002)
  - Total: 205

Koštabona (pronounced [kɔʃtaˈboːna]; Italian: Costabona) is a village in the City Municipality of Koper in the Littoral region of Slovenia.

== Name ==
Koštabona was attested in written sources in 1620 as Costabuona, and in 1763–87 as Costabona. The Slovene name Koštabona is borrowed from Italian. The name is a compound of costa 'slope' and bona 'good, fertile', referring to its physical location on a fertile promontory.

Another theory, based on oral tradition, claims that in Late Antiquity Koštabona was the site of a Roman fortress named Castrum Bonae guarding the trade route through the Dragonja Valley, and that the name is derived from this. However, Italian has no co- reflex derived from this noun (cf. Italian castellum 'castle'), and the expected Italian reflex of Latin castrum would be **castro, not costa (cf. Latin astrum > Italian astro 'star', Latin rastrum > Italian rastro 'rake', etc.).

== History ==
Koštabona stands on a hill above the Dragonja River. Archaeological evidence shows that the site was inhabited in prehistoric times.

== Churches ==
The parish church in the settlement is dedicated to Saints Cosmas and Damian. There is also a small church dedicated to the Blessed Deacon Elias (said to be a disciple of Saint Hermagoras) and a cemetery church dedicated to Saint Andrew.

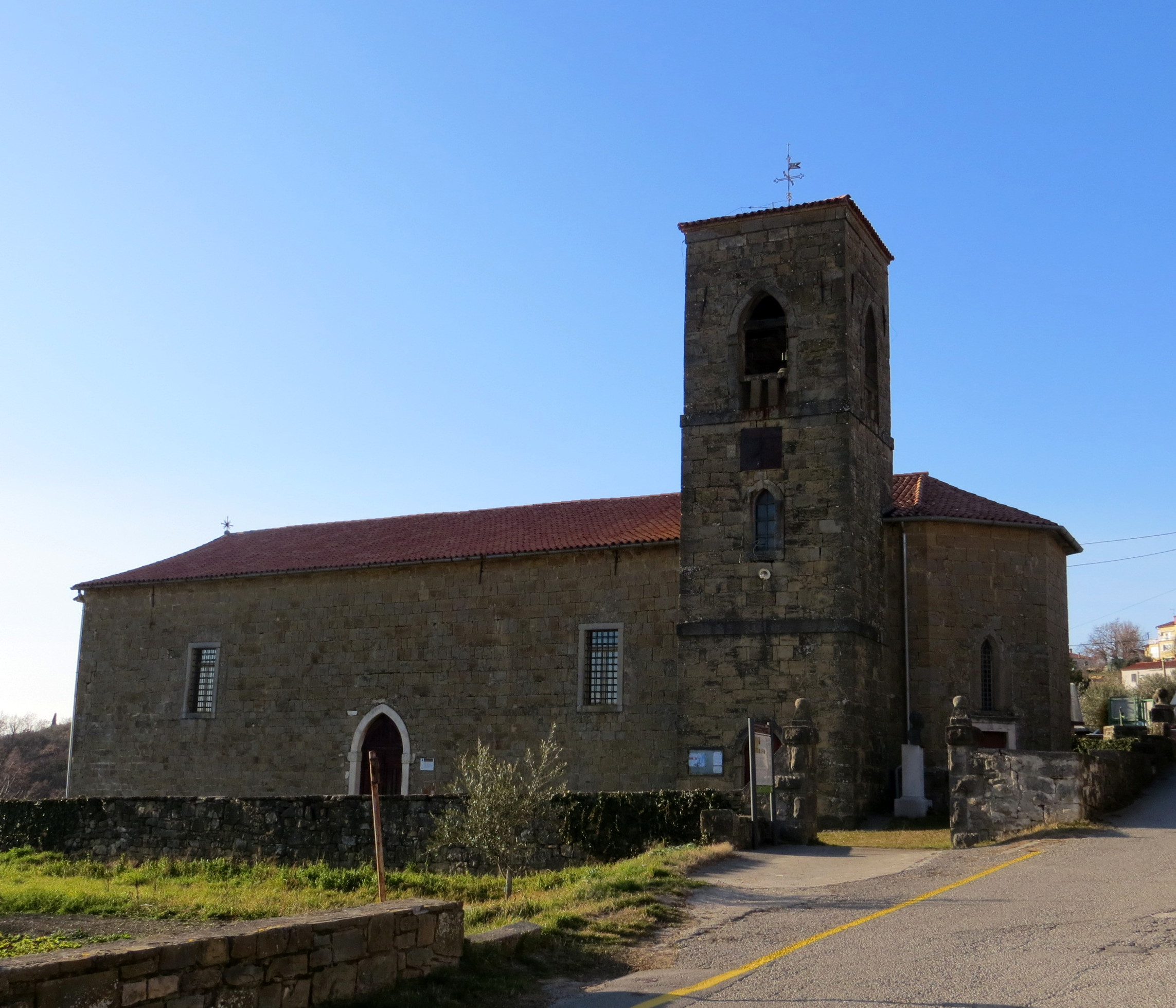
Saints Cosmas and Damian Church

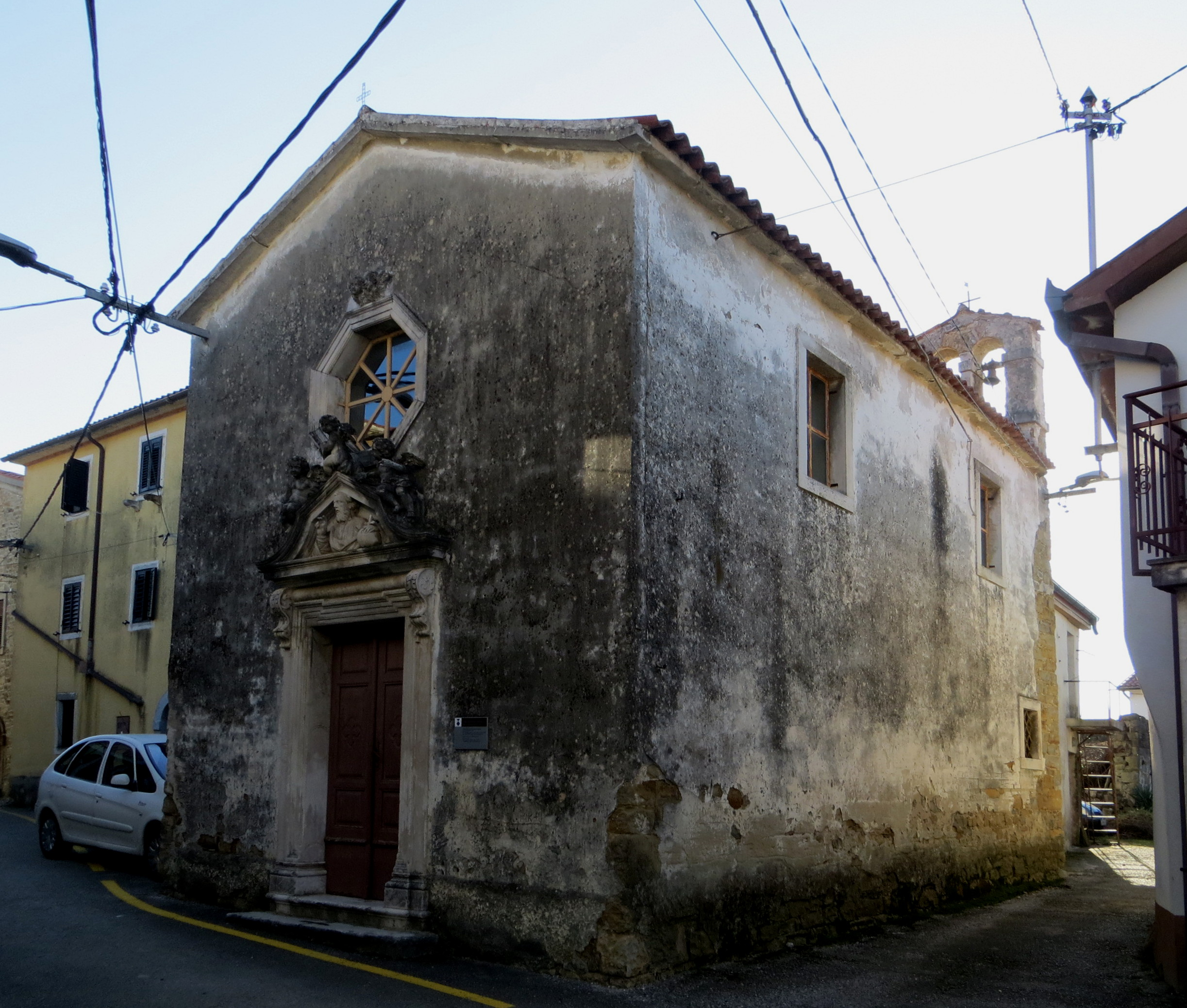
Blessed Deacon Elias Church

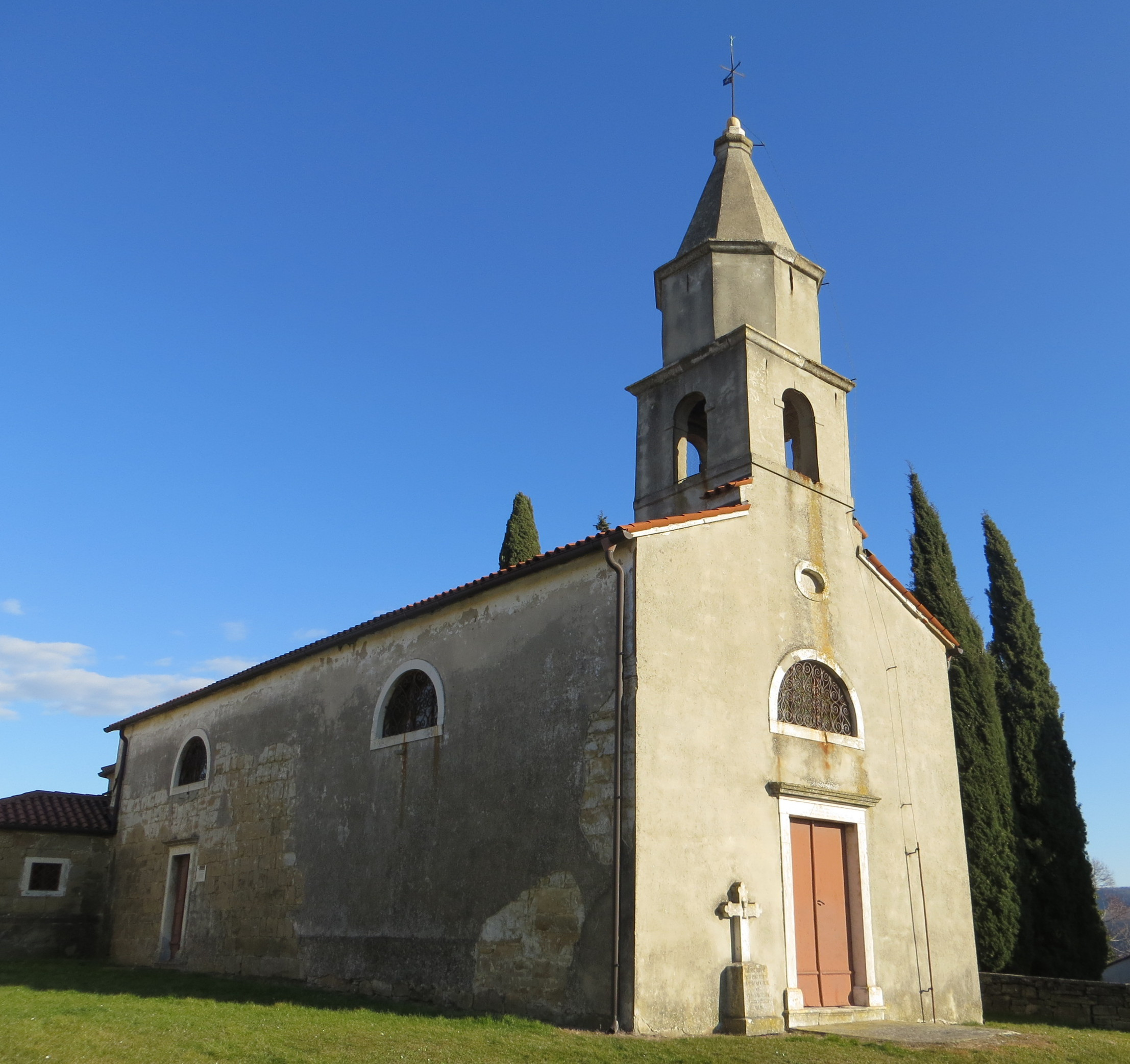
Saint Andrew's Church

Churches in Koštabona
