= Parecag =

Parecag Parezzago (Italian)
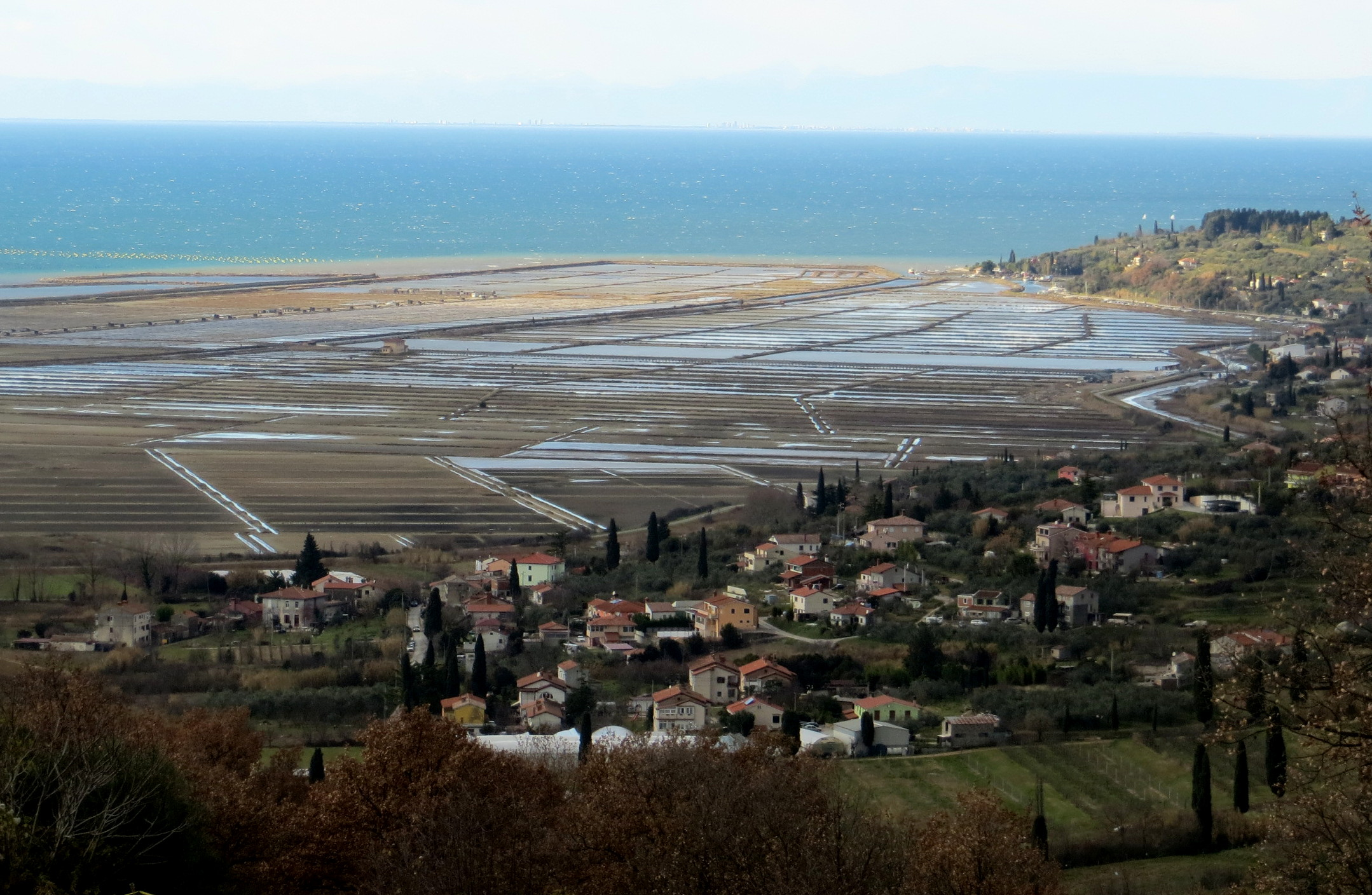

- Location in Slovenia
- Coordinates: 45°28′54.51″N 13°38′21.39″E
- Country: Slovenia
- Traditional region: Slovenian Littoral
- Statistical region: Coastal–Karst
- Municipality: Piran

Area
  - Total: 9.45 km^{2} (3.65 sq mi)
- Elevation: 87.7 m (288 ft)

Population (2022)
  - Total: 1,049

Parecag (pronounced [paɾɛˈtsaːk]; Italian: Parezzago) is a settlement next to Sečovlje in the Municipality of Piran in the Littoral region of Slovenia. Most of the Sečovlje saltworks lies in the area of Parecag.

== Name ==
Parecag was attested in written sources in 1257 as Padriçagi, and in 1294 as Pareçagum and Padrecagum. The Slovenian name Parecag is borrowed from Italian Parezzago, which developed from Latin *Patriciācum, based on the personal name Patricius. Etymologically, the name means 'property owned by Patricius'.
