= Municipality of Piran =

Municipality of Slovenia

Municipality of Piran Občina Piran, Comune di Pirano
- Municipality
- Coat of arms

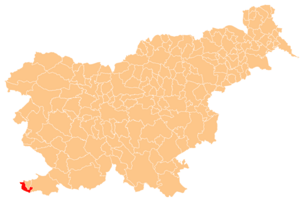
- Location of the Municipality of Piran in Slovenia
- Coordinates: 45°29′N 13°37′E
- Country: Slovenia

Government
  - Mayor: Andrej Korenika (Independent)

Area
  - Total: 44 km^{2} (17 sq mi)

Population (1 July 2021)
  - Total: 18,441
  - Density: 420/km^{2} (1,100/sq mi)
- Time zone: UTC+01 (CET)
  - Summer (DST): UTC+02 (CEST)
- Website: https://www.piran.si/

The Municipality of Piran (Slovene pronunciation: [piˈɾáːn]; Slovene: Občina Piran, Italian: Comune di Pirano) is a municipality in the traditional region of the Littoral in southwestern Slovenia. The seat of the municipality is the town of Piran. Piran became a municipality in 1994.

== Geography ==
The Municipality of Piran borders Croatia to the south and the municipalities of Izola and Koper to the east, and it faces Italy across the Gulf of Trieste and the Adriatic Sea. The highest point, Baretovec pri Padni, has an elevation of 289 meters (948 ft).

=== Settlements ===
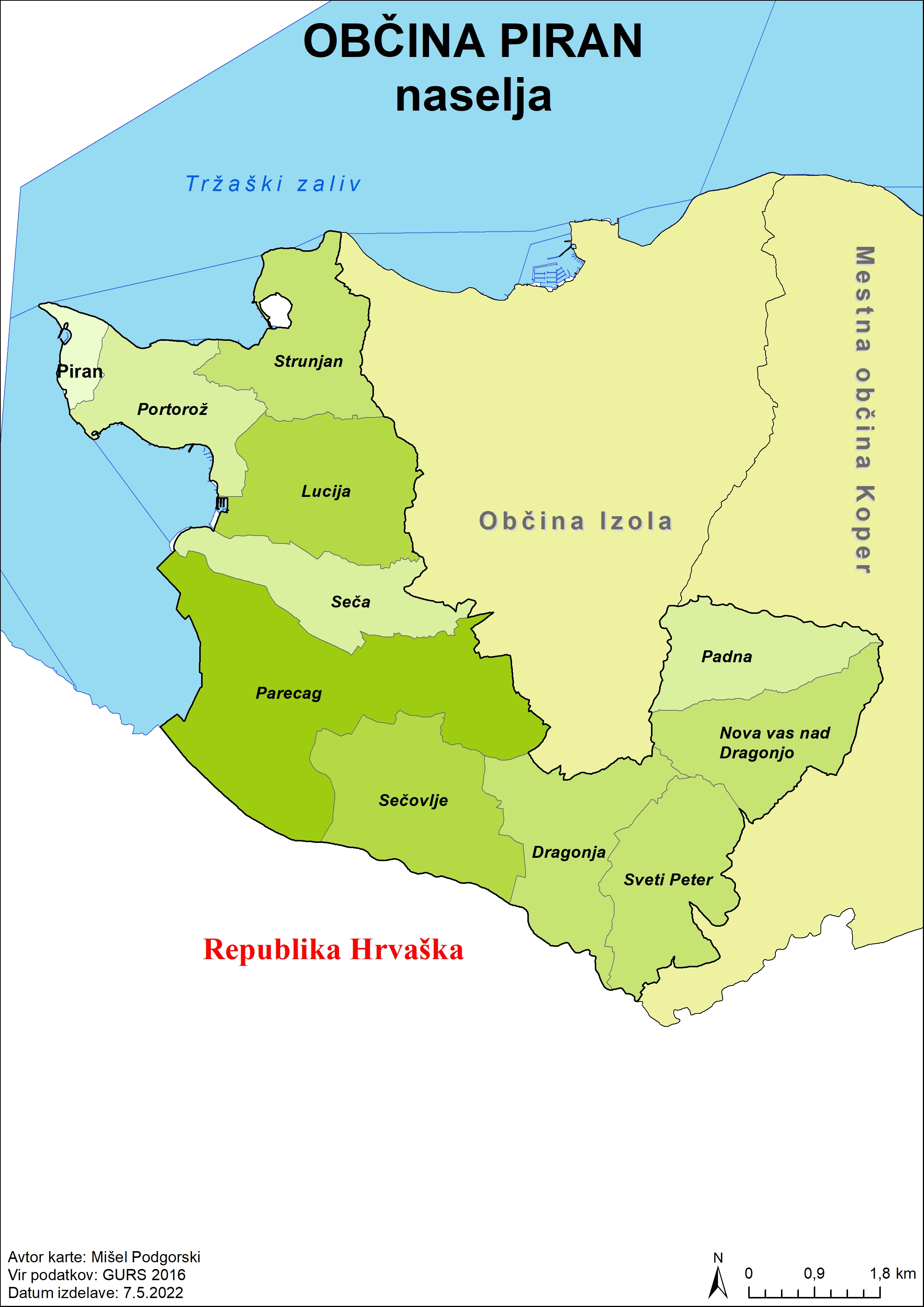
Villages in the municipality

In addition to the municipal seat of Piran, the municipality also includes the following settlements:

- Dragonja
- Lucija
- Nova Vas nad Dragonjo
- Padna
- Parecag
- Portorož
- Seča
- Sečovlje
- Strunjan
- Sveti Peter

== Language ==
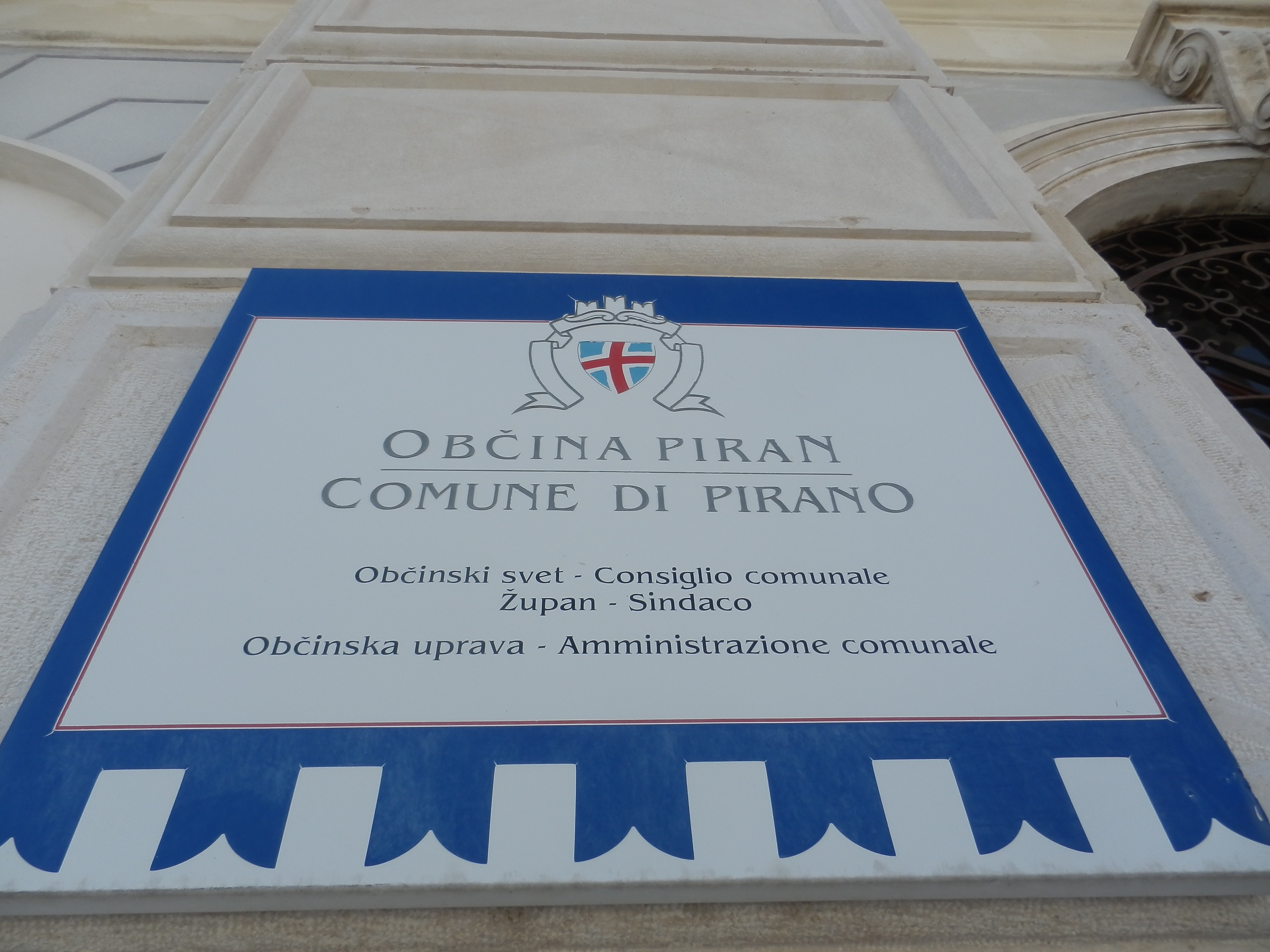
Bilingual sign in Slovene and in Italian

The municipality is bilingual; both Slovene and Italian are official languages. According to the Austrian language census of 1910, in the surrounding countryside within the municipal limits, the population was mixed, both Italian and Slovene, with some villages (such as Sveti Peter and Padna) which were almost entirely Slovene-speaking, and others (such as Sečovlje and Seča) that were almost exclusively Italian-speaking. As a whole, 85.1% of the population of the Municipality of Piran were Italian speakers, and 15.2% were Slovenes.
