= Dragonja, Piran =

Dragonja Dragogna (Italian)
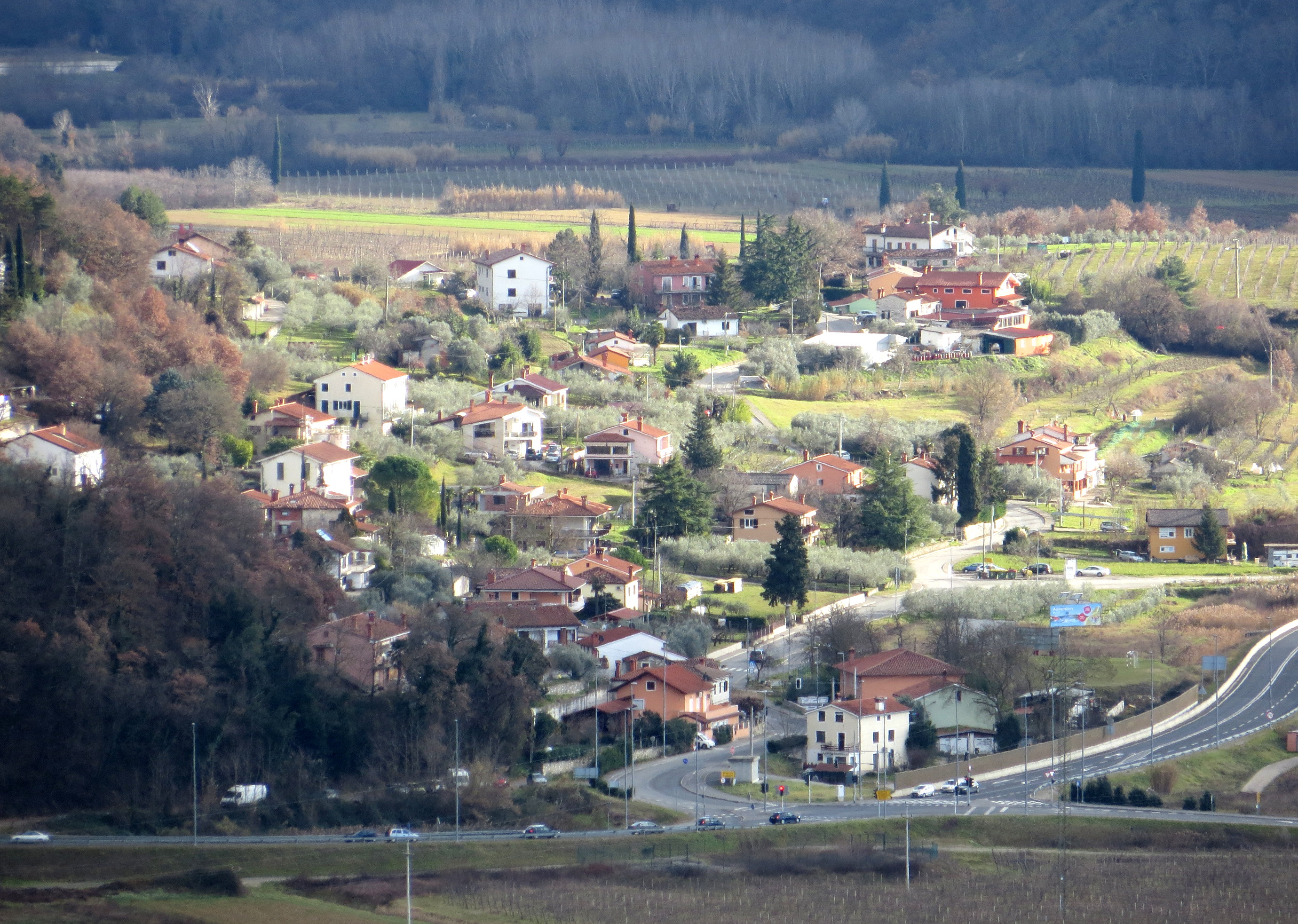

- Location within Slovenia
- Coordinates: 45°27′34.63″N 13°39′27.4″E
- Country: Slovenia
- Traditional region: Slovenian Littoral
- Statistical region: Coastal–Karst
- Municipality: Piran

Area
  - Total: 4.09 km^{2} (1.58 sq mi)
- Elevation: 14.5 m (48 ft)

Population (2002)
  - Total: 296
  - Density: 72.4/km^{2} (187/sq mi)

Dragonja (pronounced [dɾaˈɡoːnja]; Italian: Dragogna) is a settlement in the Municipality of Piran in the Littoral region of Slovenia.

== Geography ==
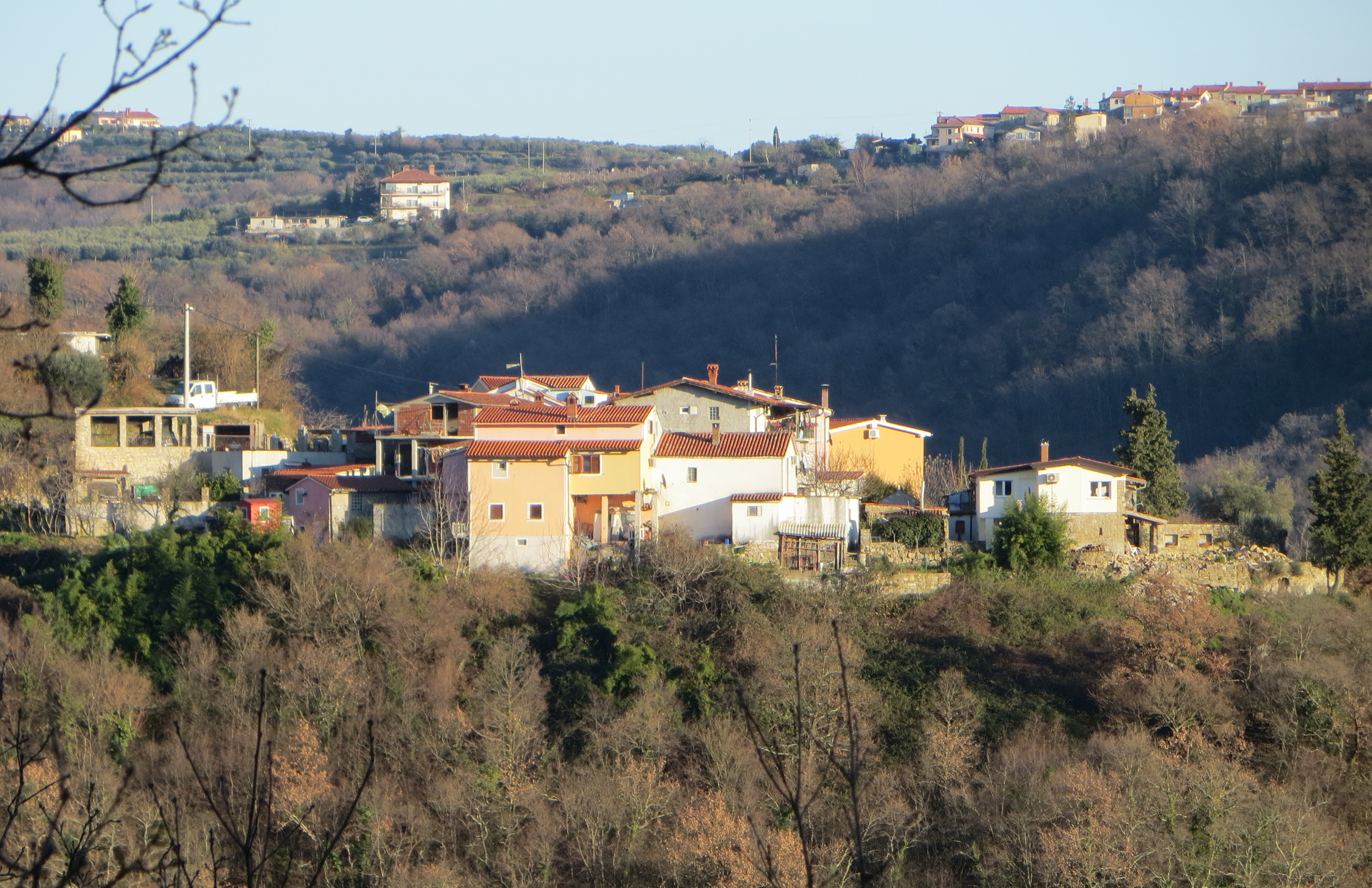
The hamlet of Slami

Dragonja lies on the right bank of the Dragonja River on the border with Croatia. The nearby Dragonja international border crossing is one of the main crossings from Slovenian into Croatian Istria. The territory of Dragonja extends along the valleys of the Dragonja and Drnica rivers, and it include the hamlets of Gočan, Križišče Sečovlje, Križišče, Stena, Mlini, Rota, Pesjanci, Ruda, Slami, and Vuki.

== Name ==
Dragonja is named after the Dragonja River, which was first attested in written sources as Argao (ablative Argaone). The Slovene name (with initial D-) is derived from Slavic *Dorgonʼa, from Romance d- (< ad 'at') + Argaon- (with metathesis). Ultimately, the name is of pre-Romance origin.

== History ==
Dragonja was created as a village in 1960 by combining various scattered houses and hamlets along the route between Šmarje and Buje, Croatia. Remnants of Roman settlement have been discovered in the area. Roman brick was found to the southeast in 1924, remains of a Roman brick wall were found during regulation of the Dragonja River, and a Roman cremation burial was discovered at the bridge across the Dragonja. After the Second World War, a brick kiln operated in the hamlet of Ruda.
