= Padna =

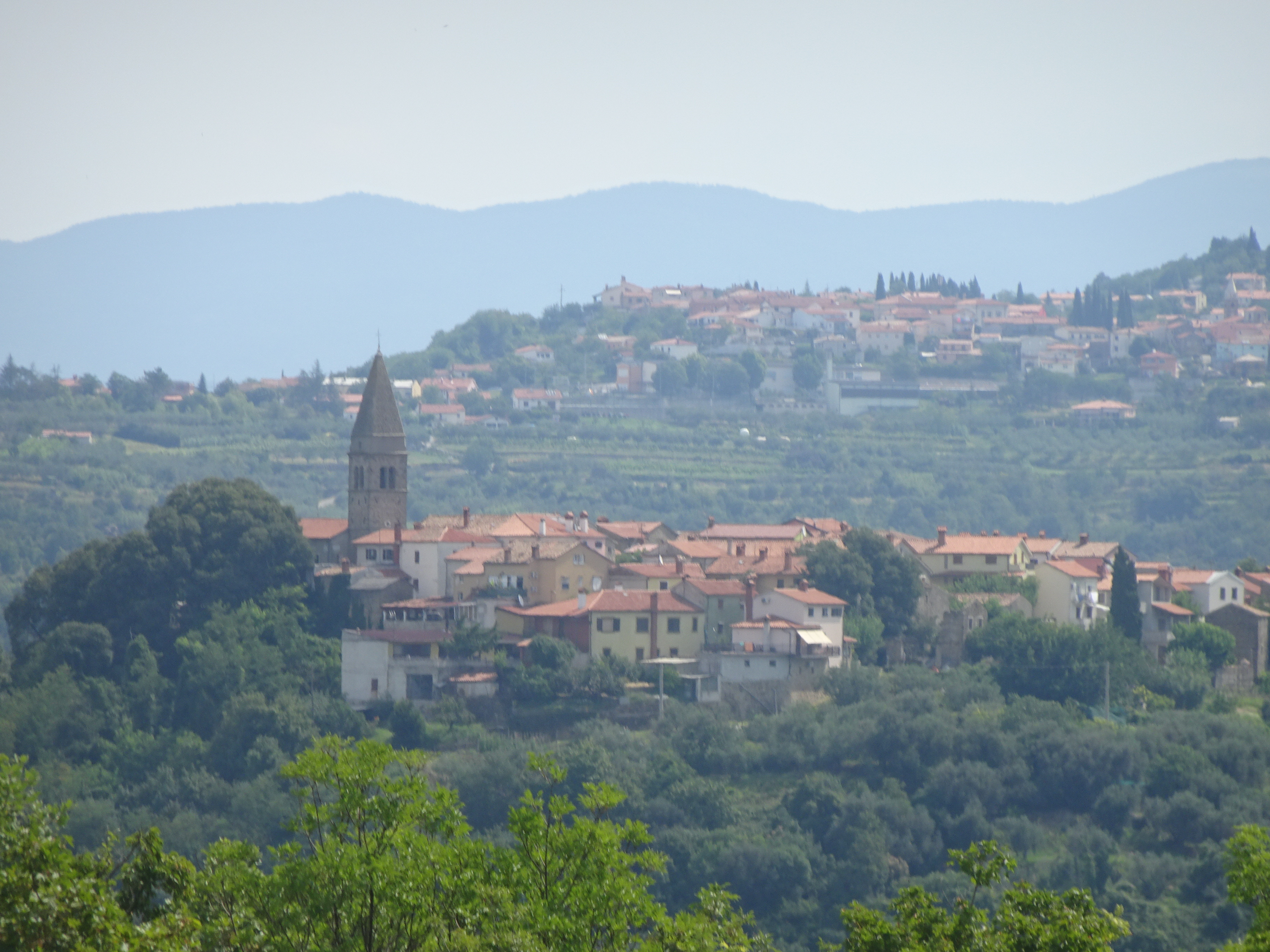

- Location in Slovenia
- Coordinates: 45°29′29.45″N 13°41′3.24″E
- Country: Slovenia
- Traditional region: Slovenian Littoral
- Statistical region: Coastal–Karst
- Municipality: Piran

Area
  - Total: 2.91 km^{2} (1.12 sq mi)
- Elevation: 208.4 m (684 ft)

Population (2002)
  - Total: 156

Padna (pronounced [ˈpaːdna]) is a village in the Municipality of Piran in the Littoral region of Slovenia. It was first mentioned in sources dating to 1186.

== Name ==
Padna was attested in written sources in 1384 as uresus Padhenam Muglarii as well as Padena and Padina. These attestations indicate that the original name of the settlement was Padina, derived from the common noun *padina 'steep slope', reflecting the local geography.

== Churches ==
The local church is dedicated to Saint Blaise. Another small church above the settlement is dedicated to Saint Sabbas.

== Art gallery ==
There is an art gallery in the village with a permanent exhibition of works by the Slovene artist Božidar Jakac, who lived in the village for a while.
