= Sveti Peter, Piran =

Sveti Peter Šupeter (locally), San Pietro dell'Amata (Italian)
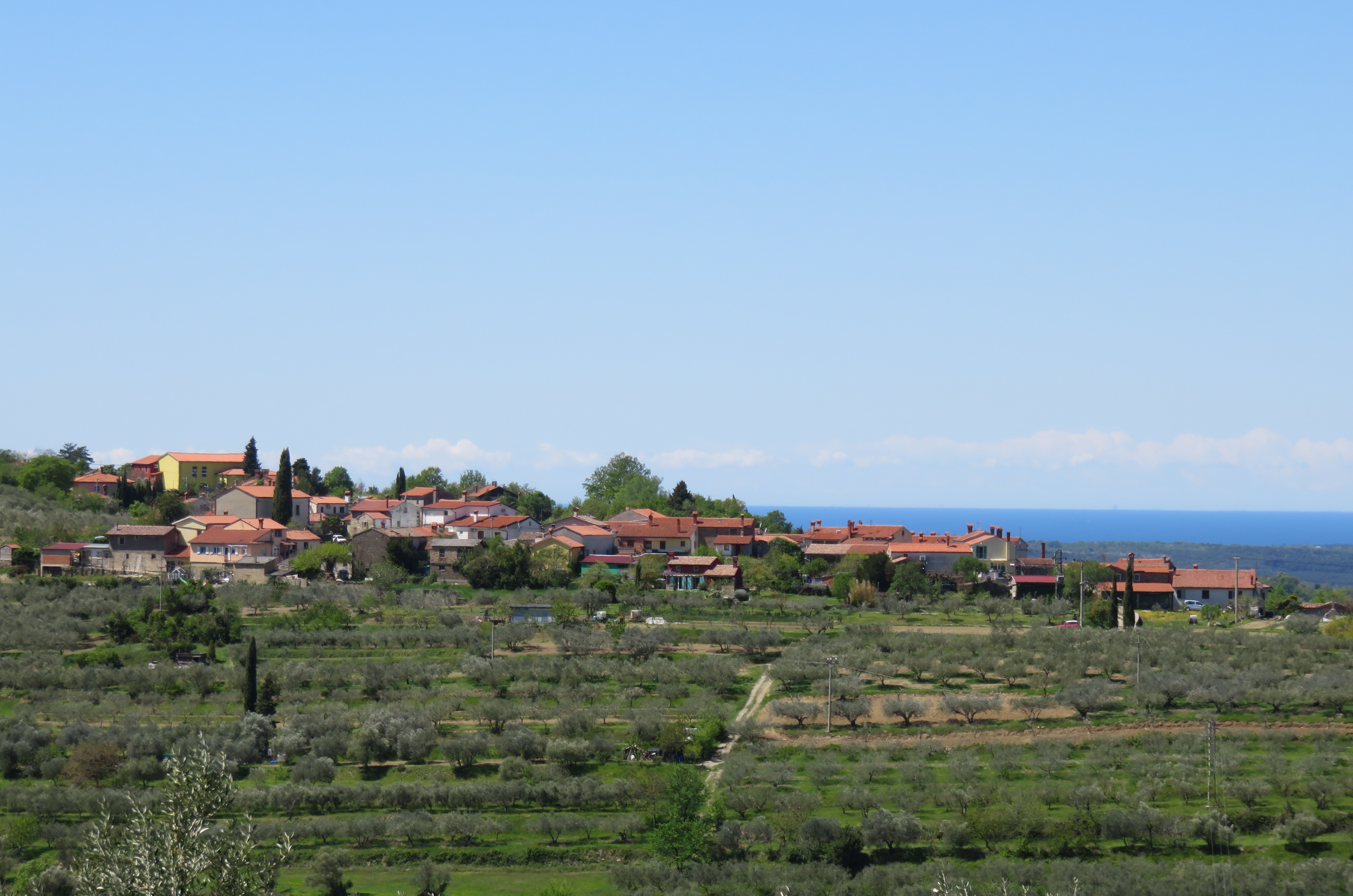

- Location in Slovenia
- Coordinates: 45°27′59.72″N 13°41′3.94″E
- Country: Slovenia
- Traditional region: Slovenian Littoral
- Statistical region: Coastal–Karst
- Municipality: Piran

Area
  - Total: 3.96 km^{2} (1.53 sq mi)
- Elevation: 210 m (690 ft)

Population (2002)
  - Total: 329

Sveti Peter (pronounced [ˈsʋeːti ˈpeːtəɾ]; Italian: San Pietro dell'Amata) is a village in the Municipality of Piran in the Littoral region of Slovenia.

== Name ==
The name of the settlement was changed from Sveti Peter (literally, 'Saint Peter') to Raven (literally, 'plain') in 1955. The name was changed on the basis of the 1948 Law on Names of Settlements and Designations of Squares, Streets, and Buildings as part of efforts by Slovenia's postwar communist government to remove religious elements from toponyms. The name Sveti Peter was restored in 1992. The settlement is also known locally as Šupeter.

== Church ==
The local church is dedicated to Saint Peter.
