= Sečovlje =

Sečovlje Sicciole (Italian)
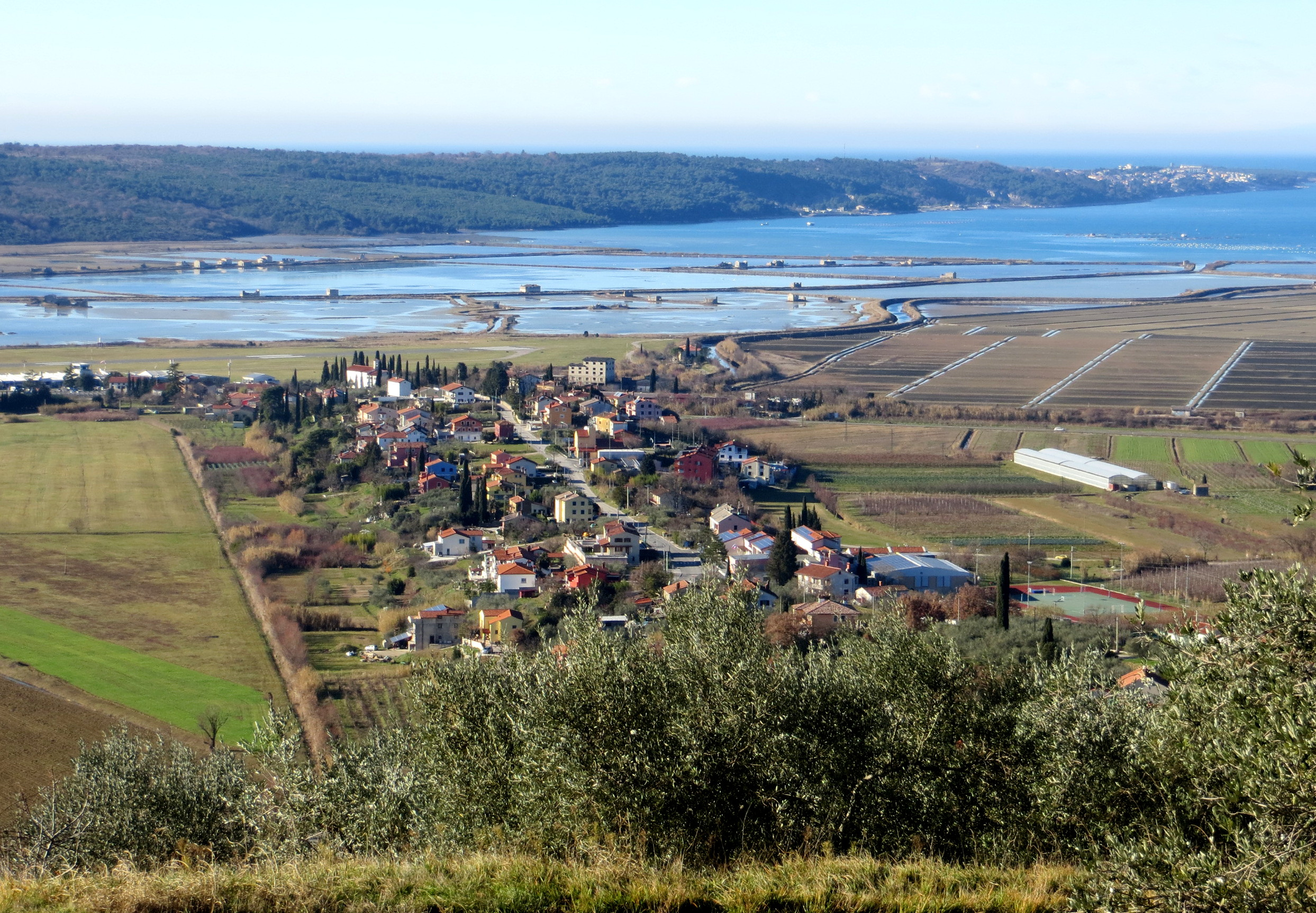
- Interactive map of Sečovlje
- Location in Slovenia
- Coordinates: 45°28′31.81″N 13°37′0.72″E
- Country: Slovenia
- Traditional region: Slovenian Littoral
- Statistical region: Coastal–Karst
- Municipality: Piran

Area
  - Total: 5.41 km^{2} (2.09 sq mi)
- Elevation: 2.4 m (7.9 ft)

Population (2002)
  - Total: 584

Sečovlje (pronounced [sɛˈtʃoːu̯ljɛ]; Italian: Sicciole) is a settlement in the Municipality of Piran in the Littoral region of Slovenia.

== Name ==
The modern Slovene name Sečovlje is an artificial creation dating from after 1945. It was coined from the Italian name of the settlement, Sicciole, influenced by the name of the neighbouring village of Seča. The origin of the Italian name of the village, Sicciole, is uncertain.

== Overview ==
Sečovlje is the last Slovenian settlement before the Slovenia–Croatia border on the highway south from Portorož. Its main source of income is tourism at Sečovlje Saltpans Natural Park. The section of the Parenzana railway path that ran through Sečovlje is now a recreational path for tourists. Nearby is the Portorož Airport, which offers panoramic flights over Slovenian Istria.

The Sečovlje international border crossing is one of the main crossings from Slovenia into Croatian Istria.

== History ==
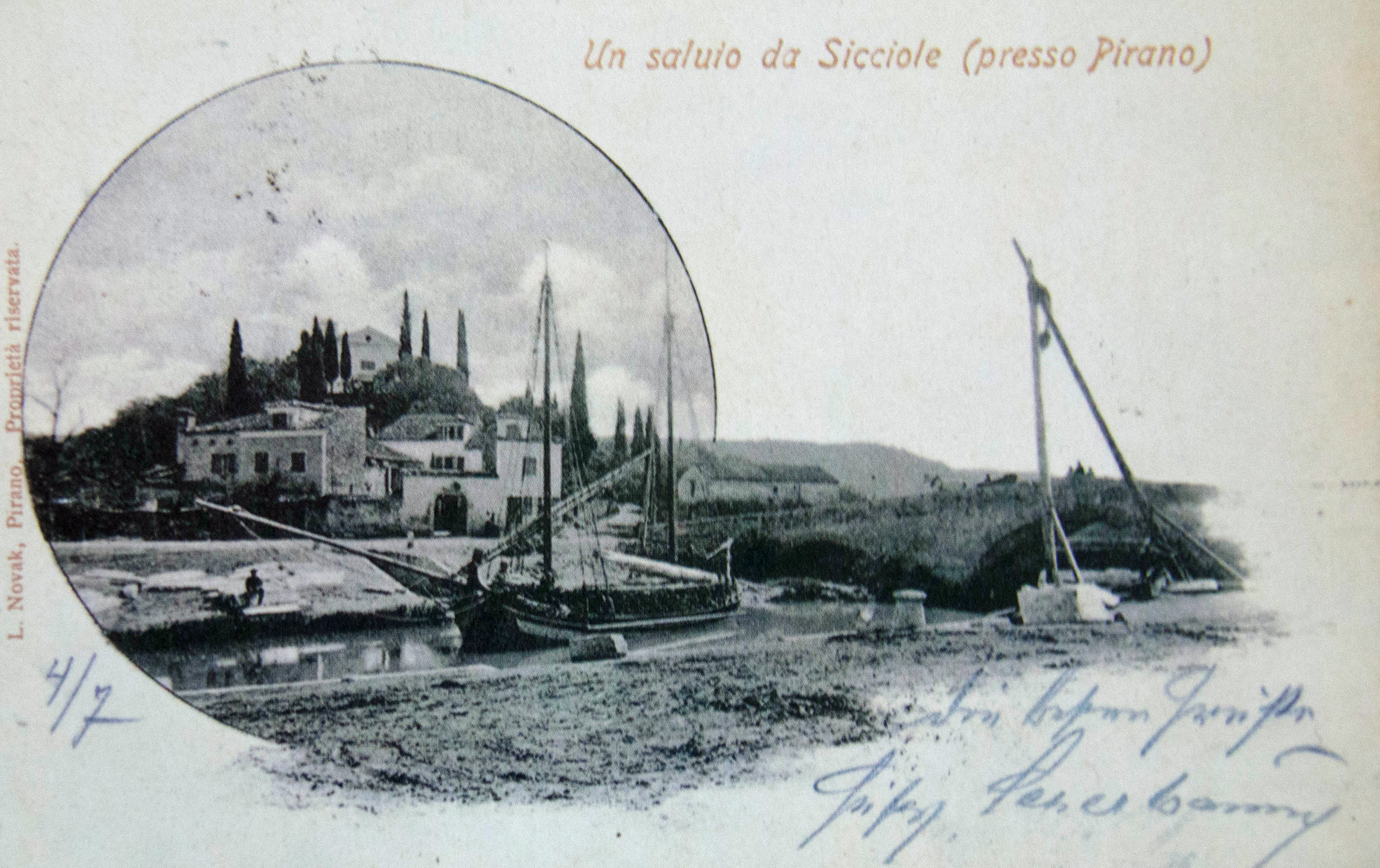
Postcard of Sečovlje (1903)

Archaeological finds and text sources point to a settlement in the area of Sečovlje that dates back to the Roman times, the nearby salt pans in the 12th century. Modernisation of the salt pans occurred in the 14th century, and salt production drastically increased in the times of Austria-Hungary, when the mines expanded to an area of 508 hectares and were from the 24 April (St George) to 24 August (St Bartholomew) the source of income for about 500 families.

== Economy ==
Solinair has its head office in Sečovlje, on the property of Portorož Airport.

== Churches ==
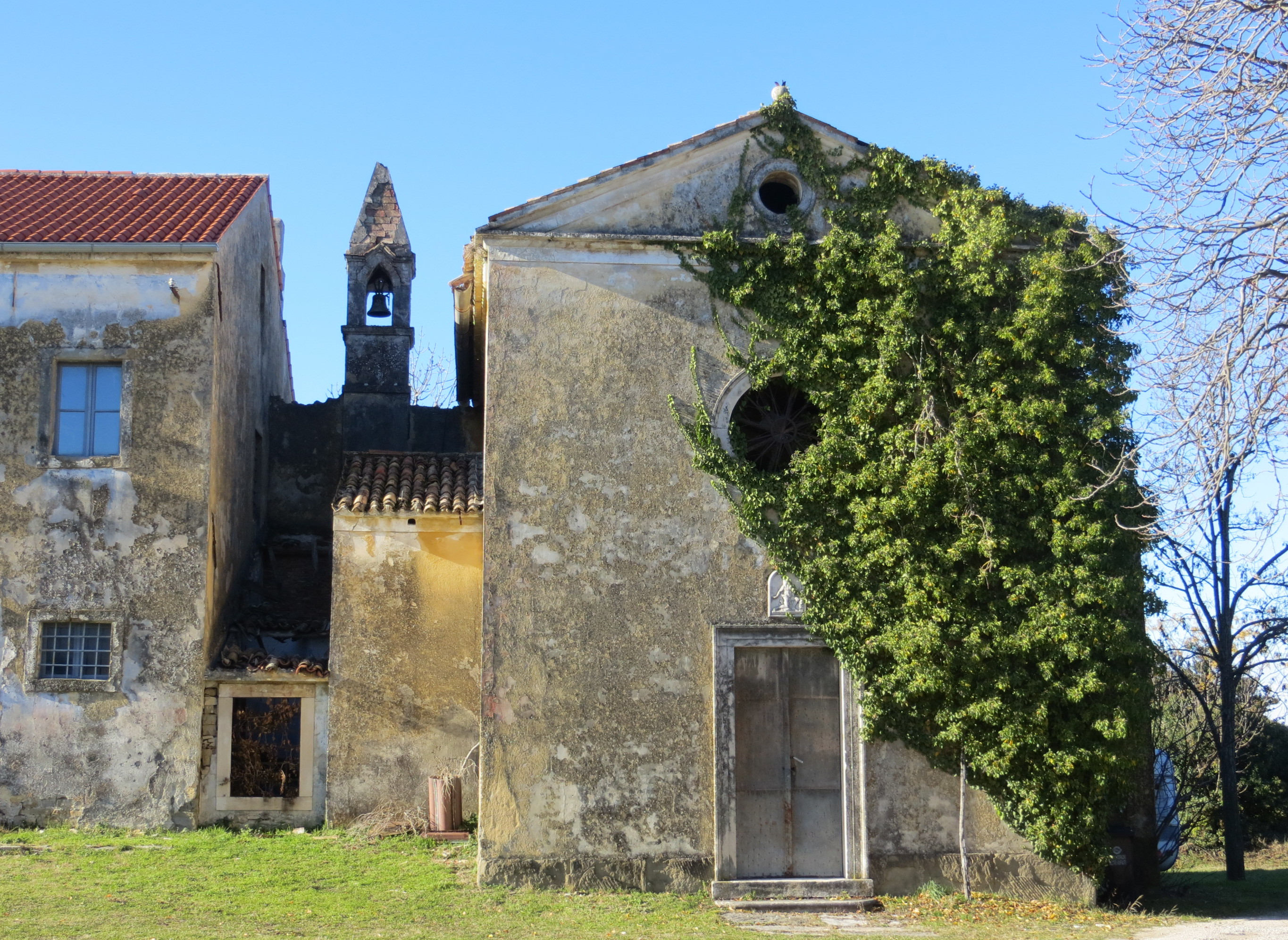
Saint Onuphrius's Church

The parish church in the settlement is dedicated to Saint Martin.

There is a second church in the hamlet of Krog in the hills west of the village centre. A Benedictine monastery was established at the site in 1432, and the church is dedicated to Saint Onuphrius. The monastery was active until 1957, when the monks were expelled and the property was nationalised. The church and monastery were then allowed to fall into decay.
