= Gulf of Trieste =

Bay in Italy, Slovenia, and Croatia

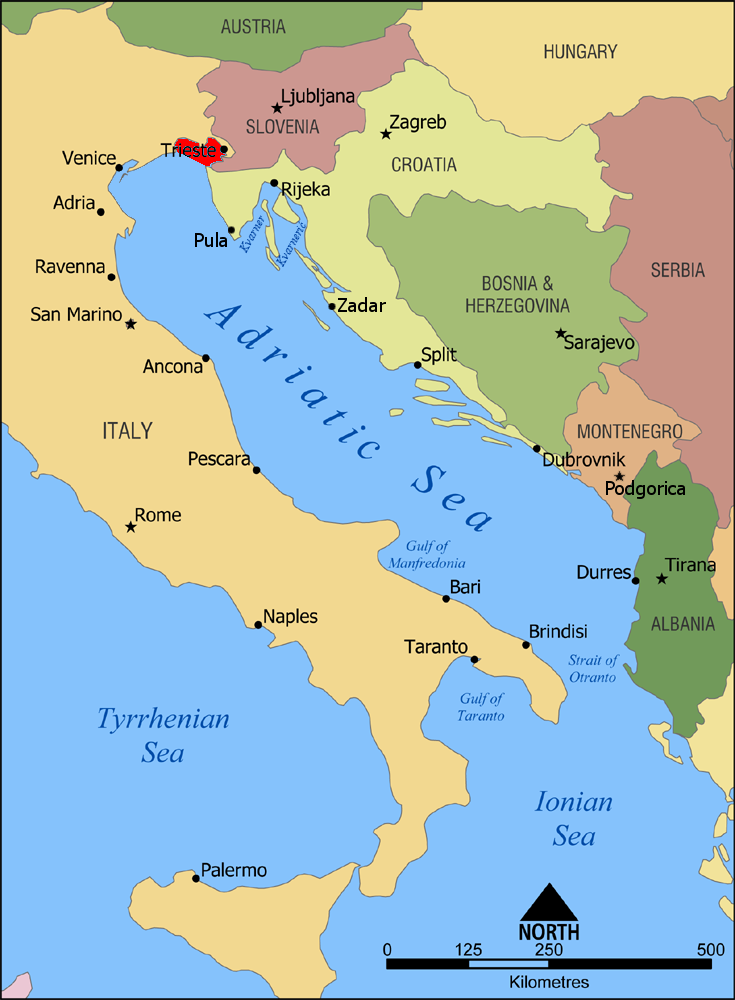
- Gulf of Trieste highlighted in red within the Adriatic Sea

- Location within Italy
- Location: Europe
- Coordinates: 45°40′N 13°35′E
- Basin countries: Italy, Slovenia, Croatia
- Surface area: 550 km^{2} (210 sq mi)
- Average depth: 18.7 m (61 ft)
- Max. depth: 37.25 m (122.2 ft)
- Water volume: 9,500 km^{3} (7.7×10^{9} acre⋅ft)
- Salinity: 35-38 PSU
- Settlements: Trieste, Koper

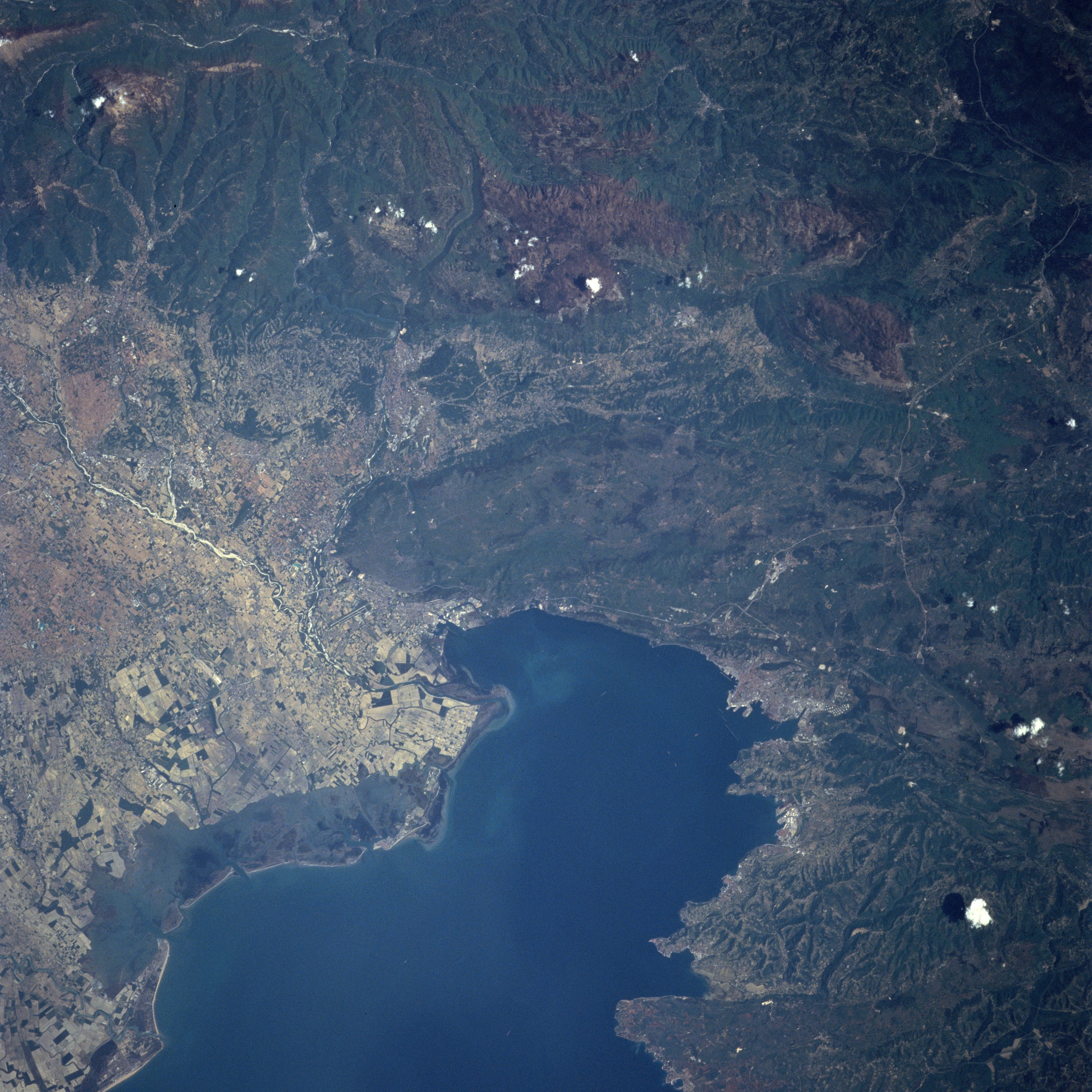
Gulf of Trieste and the littoral

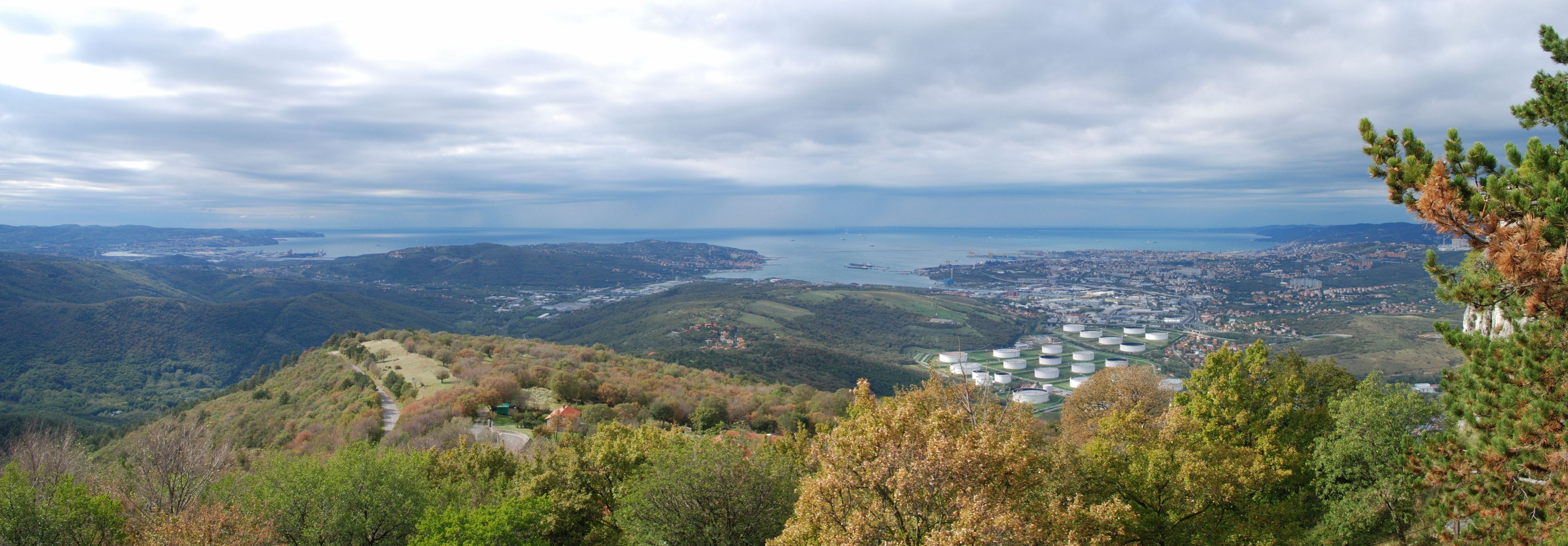
Panoramic view of the Gulf of Trieste from the vicinity of Socerb Castle in Slovenia. One may see the Savudrija Cape and the city of Koper at the Slovene Riviera to the left, the Muggia Peninsula and the village of Muggia in the centre, and the city of Trieste to the right.

The Gulf of Trieste is a shallow bay in the extreme northern part of the Adriatic Sea. It is part of the Gulf of Venice and is shared by Italy, Slovenia and Croatia. It is closed to the south by the peninsula of Istria, the largest peninsula in the Adriatic Sea, shared between Croatia and Slovenia. The entirety of Slovenia's coastline is part of the Gulf of Trieste.

== Overview ==
The gulf is limited by an imaginary line connecting the Punta Tagliamento on the Italian and Savudrija (Punta Salvore) on the Croatian coast. Its area is approximately 550 square kilometres (210 sq mi), its average depth is 18.7 metres (61 ft), and its maximum depth is 37 metres (121 ft). With the exception of flat islets blocking the entrance to Marano-Grado lagoon, there are no islands in the gulf. Its eastern coasts, with Trieste and the Slovenian Littoral, have more rugged relief.

The sea current in the gulf flows counterclockwise. Its average speed is 0.8 knots. Tides in the gulf are among the largest in the Adriatic Sea, but nevertheless do not usually exceed 60 centimetres (24 in). The average salinity is 37–38‰, but in the summer it falls below 35‰.

Its most prominent features are:

- The Bay of Panzano in Italy
- The Bay of Muggia in Italy
- The Bay of Grignano in Italy
- The Gulf of Koper in Slovenia
- The Gulf of Piran, the sovereignty over which has been a matter of dispute between Croatia and Slovenia since 1991.

The entire Slovenian coastline is located on the Gulf of Trieste. Its length is 46.6 kilometres (29.0 mi). Towns along the coastline include (from east to west) Koper, Izola, and Piran.

== See also ==
- Slovenian Riviera
- Free Territory of Trieste
  - Treaty of Osimo
- Barcolana regatta
