= Portorož Airport =

Portorož Airport Letališče Portorož
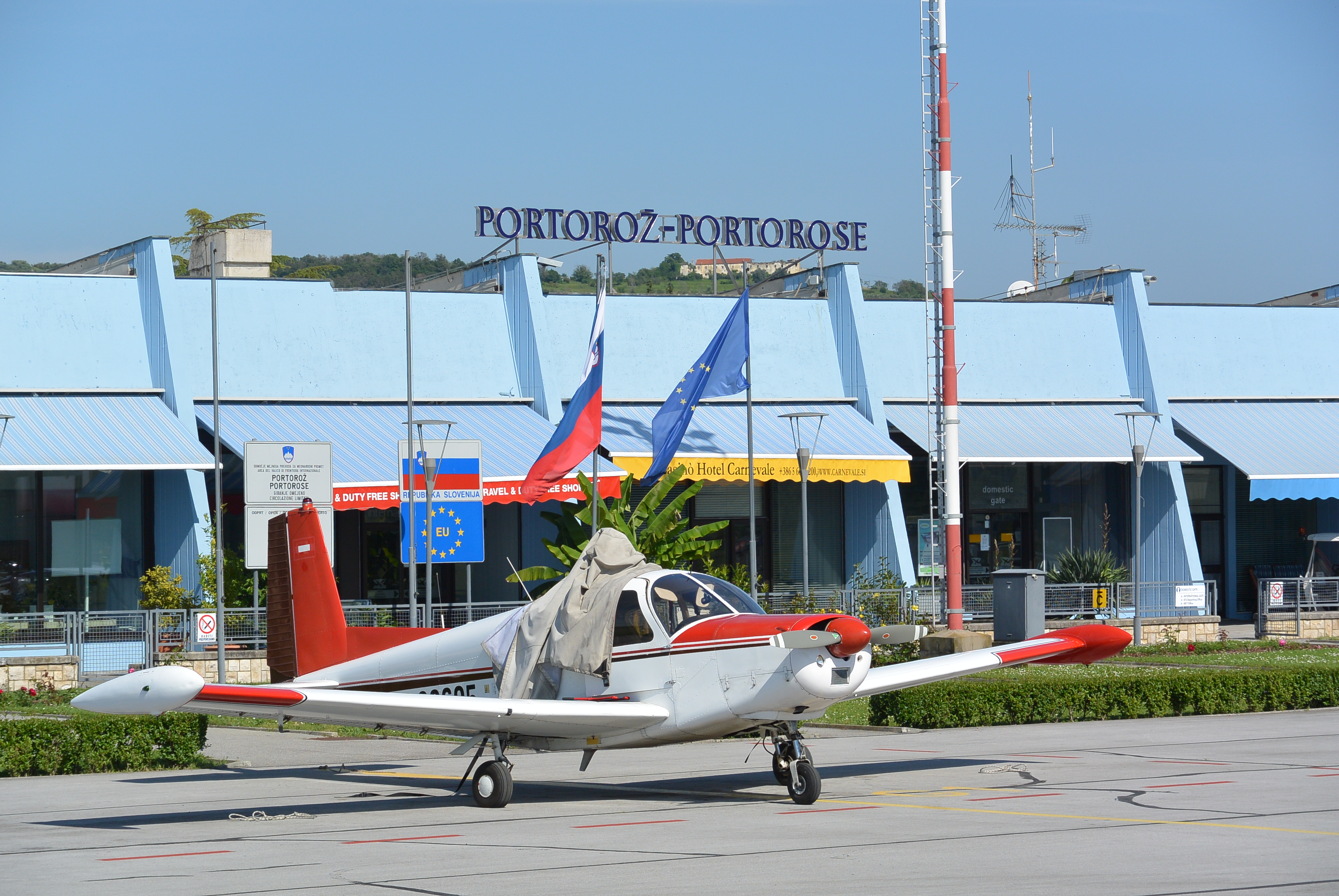
- IATA: POW; ICAO: LJPZ

Summary
- Airport type: Public
- Operator: Aerodrom Portorož d.o.o.
- Serves: Portorož
- Location: Sečovlje
- Elevation AMSL: 2 m / 7 ft
- Coordinates: 45°28′24.07″N 13°36′53.92″E
- Website: Official website

Map
- Location of airport in Slovenia

Runways
Direction	Length		Surface
Direction	m	ft	Surface
15/33	1,201	3,939	Asphalt

Statistics
- Passengers: 28,881
- Passenger change 18–19: ▲16%
- Aircraft movements: 17,333
- Movements change 18-19: ▲32%

Portorož Airport (Slovene: Aerodrom Portorož) (IATA: POW, ICAO: LJPZ) is the smallest of three international airports in Slovenia. It is located near the village of Sečovlje, 6 km (3.7 mi) south of Portorož, and less than 300 m (980 ft) from the Croatian border. The airport was opened on 27 September 1962. In addition to Portorož, the airport serves a number of other tourist destinations in the region, including Piran, Izola, Koper in Slovenia, Trieste in Italy and Umag in Croatia.

The airport is intended for passenger and cargo transport, sport, tourist and business flights. It lies at two metres above sea level, the runway measures 1,205 m × 30 m (3,953 ft × 98 ft).

== History ==
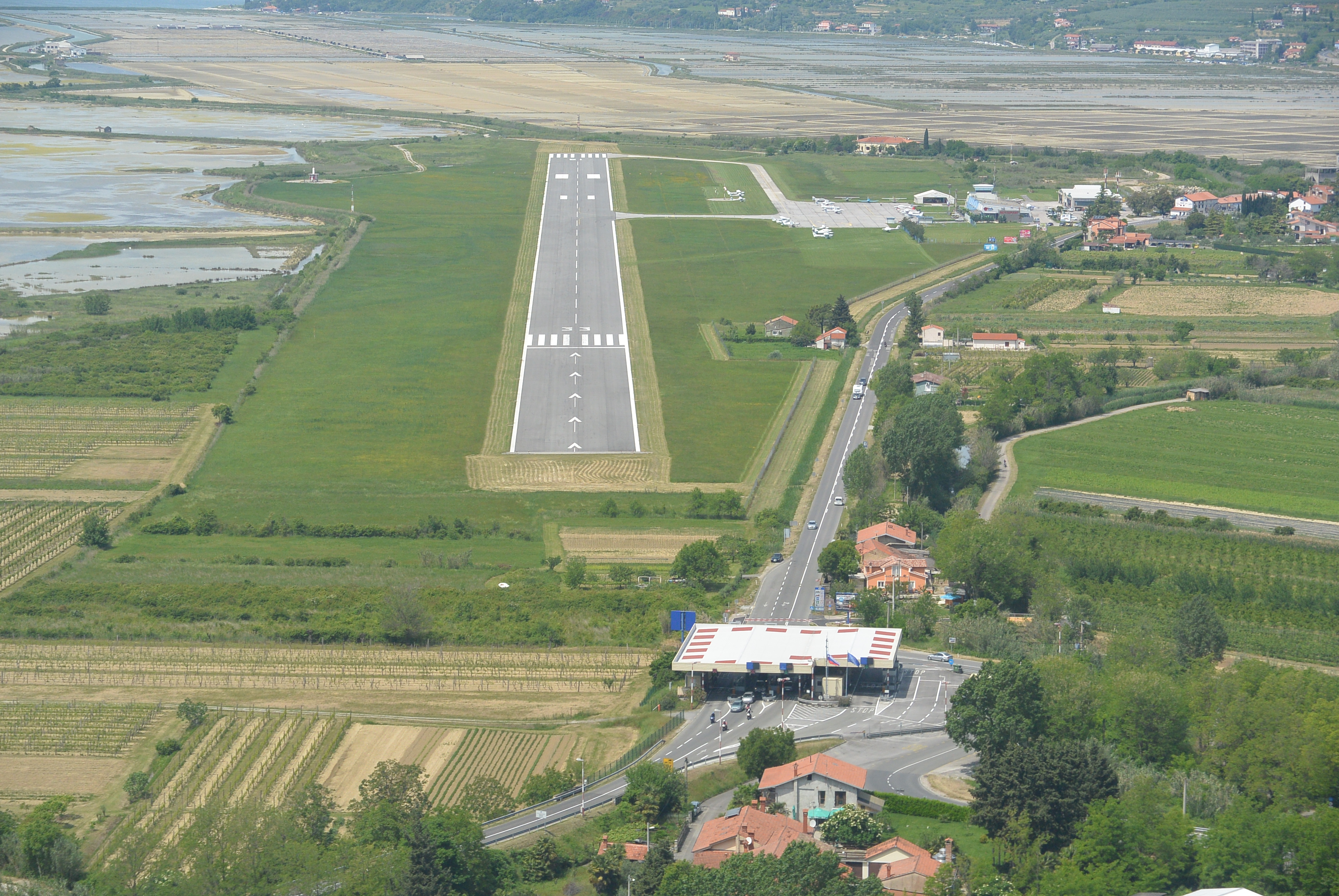
Portorož Airport

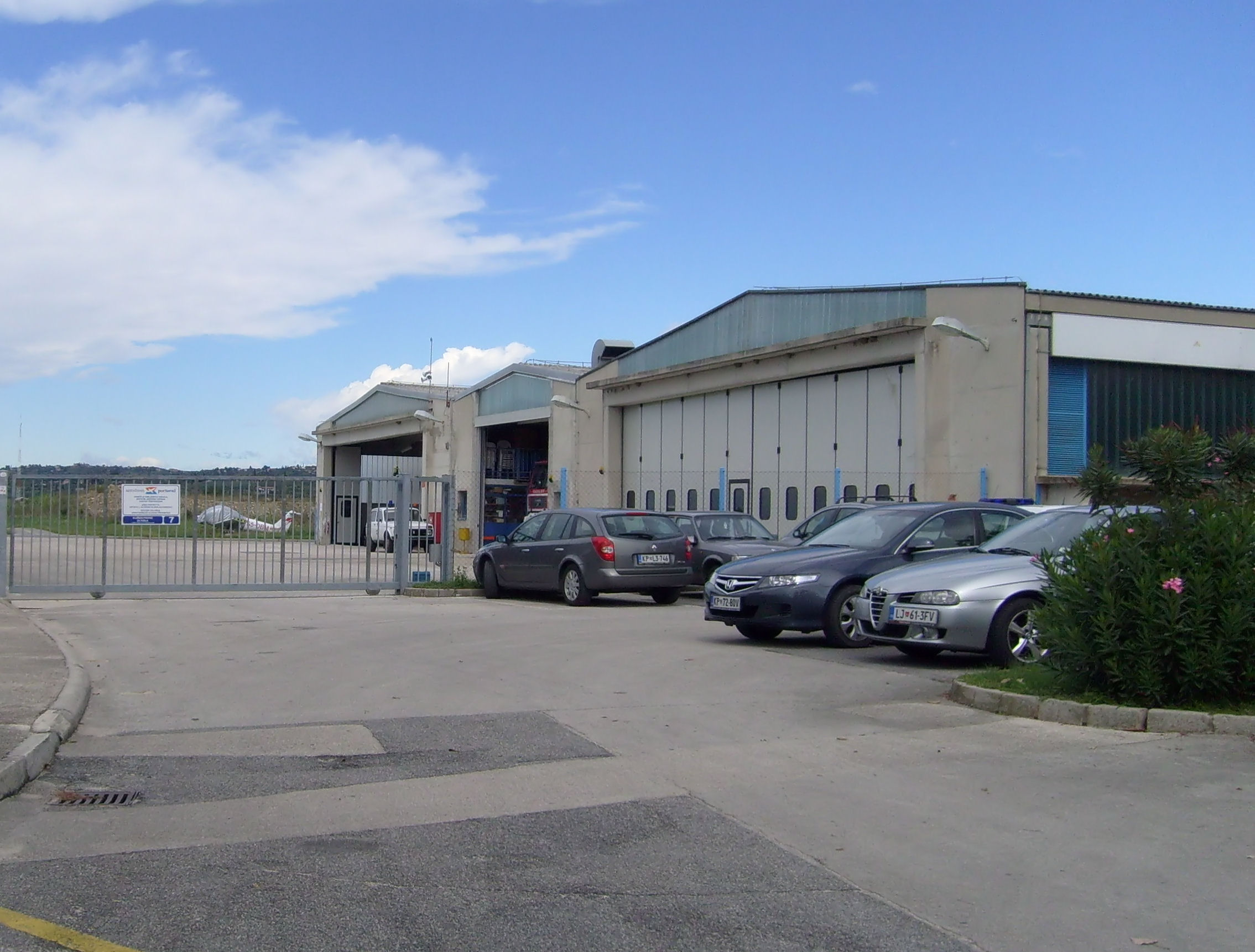
Portorož Airport from behind

As is the case in the development of many airports, Portorož Airport had a humble beginning. In 1962, ground preparations were initially made for the creation of a sports airport with a 400 m (1,300 ft) grass runway. However, in response to the LZJ decision to allow the third Adriatic Parachute Cup competitions to take place in Portorož the following year, the plans for the grass runway were ultimately changed and the runway was extended to 800 m (2,600 ft). On 27 September 1962, a flight inspection team examined Portorož Airport and recommended the issuance of a six-month temporary registration, which would classify it as a secondary sports airport, permitting the landing of aircraft weighing up to 3,000 kg (6,600 lb). The following year, on 3 April 1963, Aero club Piran was formed. Later, in 1963, the third Adriatic Parachute Cup competitions were held.

On 28 January 1971, the city of Piran decided to build an international sports airport at Portorož Airport. In July of the same year, the airport location was approved and the subsequent construction permits were issued for the construction and reconfiguration of the runway: 700 m long and 20 m wide (2,297 ft. long and 66 ft. wide). On 24 January 1972, the airfield construction and reconfiguration works were completed. The following year, 12 February 1973, the ZUCZP granted permission to register and license Portorož Airport for aviation sports purposes.

Further development of the airport continued and, in January 1975, the Coast Flight Centre was established. Later, in 1975, construction work began on a runway refurbishment and extension project. The first building phase of the airport terminal and platform was also initiated. The following year, on 21 August 1976, the airport re-entered full operations after construction works at the airport were completed. These included an enhancement to the runway, which was extended to 850 m (2,790 ft) and widened to 28 m (92 ft) - as well as the construction of an apron. Work was also completed on the first phase of the airport terminal and platform. On 1 October 1978, Portorož Airport was formally re-opened and entered into the register of airports and the register for panoramic flights. In 1979, a 400 m^{2} aircraft hangar was constructed and the first C-172 aircraft was purchased.

Portorož Airport gained the status of a commercial passenger airport when, on 2 June 1980, the Federal Authority for Transport and Communications issued a permit that allowed the airport to be operated as a category "D" airport for civilian use in both domestic and international flights. Upgrades to the airport continued and, in the same year, a fueling station, which supplies Avgas 100LL, was built. On 1 May 1981, an Aero Commander 500 (Turbo Commander) aircraft carrying 9 passengers landed from Passau. Also in 1981, the airport facilities were further expanded and included the construction of a control tower, border crossing, meteo and FIO. In 1983, the first Dash 7 landed at the airport. On 24 April 1984, the runway was lengthened to 1,200 m (3,900 ft) and widened to 30 m (98 ft). The following year, on 20 July 1984, the airport was registered to handle Dash-7 aircraft. On 20 March 1986, construction work was completed on a technical aircraft hangar and airport fire station. In 1989, in order to facilitate night operations, runway lighting and an approach lighting system in the vicinity of the airport were installed. As a consequence, on 21 March 1989, the Federal Secretary for Transport and Communication issued a permit, which allowed night operations. Also, the ICAO classification 2C was established and the fire station received a category 4 designation. Furthermore, a permit was issued for take-offs and landings of aircraft with a maximum weight of 27 tonnes (54,900 lbs.).

Investment in Portorož Airport continued and, on 15 April 1991, the Casino Touristic Company Turistično podjetje p.o. Portorož adopted a memorandum of understanding and formed a limited liability company: Aerodrom Portorož d.o.o. From 13 to 16 May 2004, aviation enthusiasts were welcomed at Portorož Airport, where the Aviatica general aviation air show took place. Later that year, on 1 July 2004, Aerodrom Portorož d.o.o. signed an agreement with its new partners: The Municipality of Piran; Aerodrom Ljubljana, d.d.; Istrabenz, holdinška družba, d.d.; and Luka Koper, d.d. (Port of Koper). The recapitalisation plan was intended to facilitate further development of the airport in the near future.

The entire airport is scheduled to undergo renovation in the near future. Moreover, there are plans for Portorož Airport's single runway to be lengthened to 1,800 m (5,900 ft) and widened to 45 m (148 ft), in order to facilitate the handling of larger aircraft such as the Boeing 757-200.

== Technical information ==
Although the airport fire station is currently declared CAT 2, it can be upgraded to CAT 4, provided a minimum of 12 hours advance notice is given - prior to commencement of the respective flight operations. Runway 33, which, as in the case of Runway 15, has a runway length of 1,205 m (3,953 ft) for takeoff purposes. However, unlike runway 15, runway 33 has a displaced threshold, meaning that aircraft landing on this runway, i.e. at a heading of 330°, are required to touchdown (landing) at a position approx. 230 m (750 ft) from the beginning of the runway, thereby reducing the runway landing distance to approx. 970 m (3,180 ft).

== Airport services ==
Although relatively small, a wide-variety of services are offered at Portorož Airport: modern airport facilities including technical and fuel service, services under contract (such as air taxi), panoramic flights, business charter flights, a flight school, parachute jumping, minibus transfer, a hotel room booking service, a restaurant, a duty-free shop as well as car rental services.

The airport has the head office of Solinair.
