= Sečovlje Saltpans Natural Park =

Slovenian nature reserve

Coordinates: 45°29′30.83″N 13°36′30.77″E

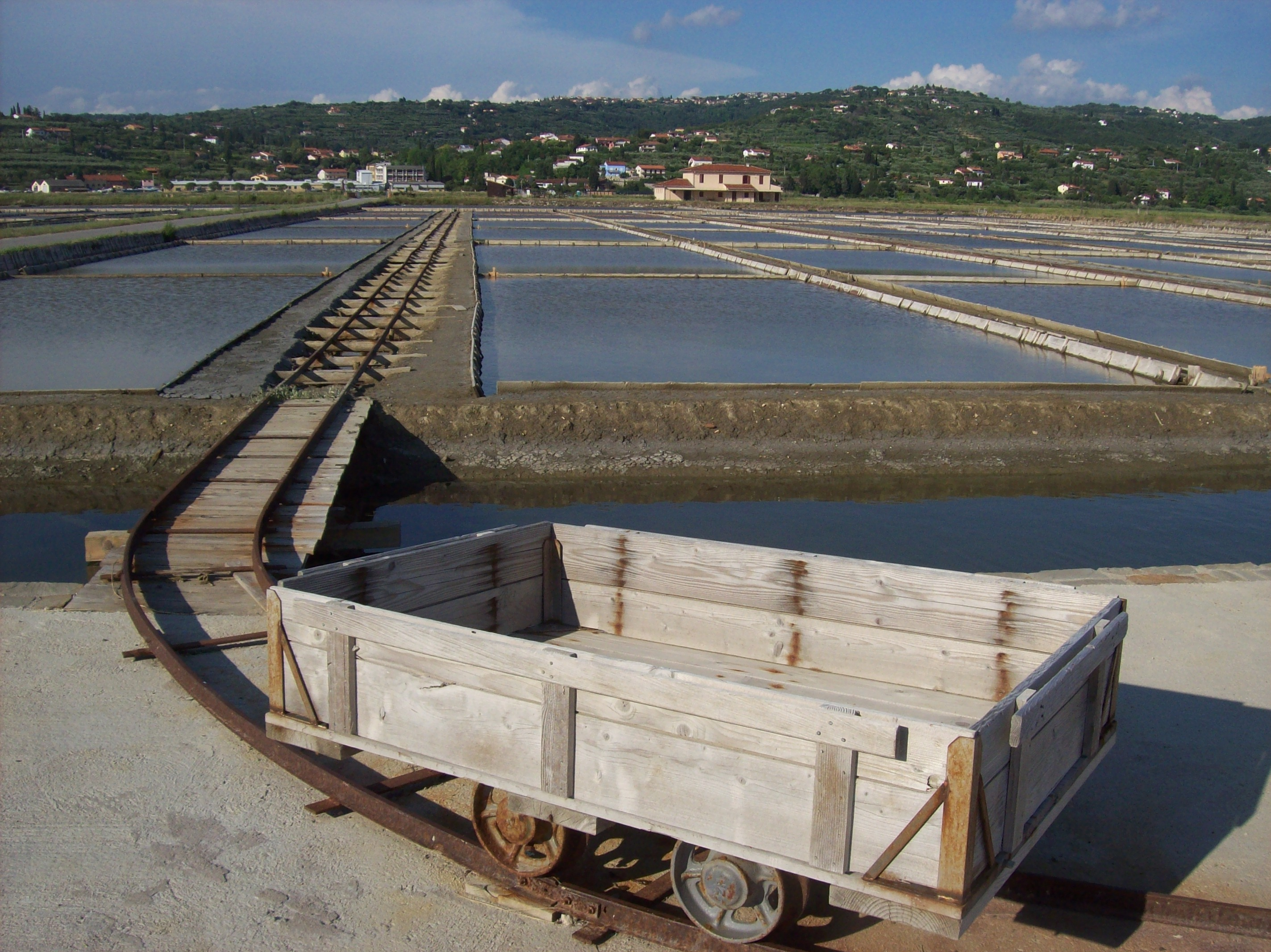
Old part of the Sečovlje Saltpans

Sečovlje Saltpans Natural Park (Slovene: Krajinski park Sečoveljske soline, Italian: Parco ambientale delle saline di Sicciole) is a landscape park in southwestern Slovenia covering the area of Sečovlje Saltpans near the village of Sečovlje. The salt evaporation pond covers an area of 16.1 hectares (40 acres), while saltworks lie along the mouth of the Dragonja River, covering an area of 650 hectares (1,600 acres).
