= Dragonja =

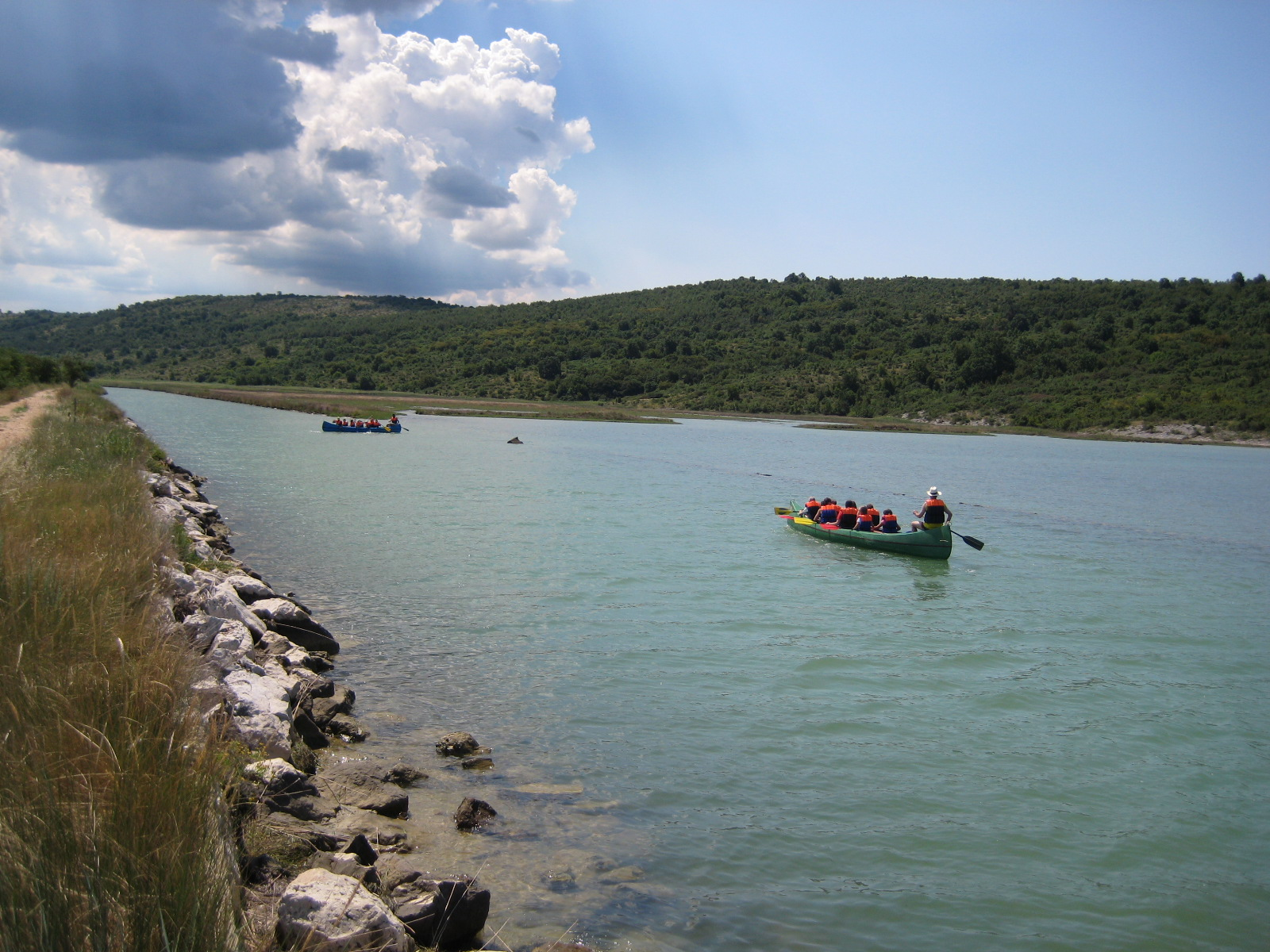
- The outflow of the Dragonja into the Gulf of Piran

Location
- Countries: Slovenia; Croatia

Physical characteristics
- Source
  - location: Poletiči (Koper)
  - elevation: 315 m (1,033 ft)
- Mouth
  - location: Adriatic Sea, Sečovlje Saltpans
  - coordinates: 45°28′42″N 13°35′10″E
- Length: 30 km (19 mi)
- Basin size: 95.6 km^{2} (36.9 sq mi)

The Dragonja (pronounced [dɾaˈɡoːnja]; Italian: Dragogna) is a 30-kilometre (19 mi) long river in the northern part of the Istrian peninsula. It is a meandering river with a very branched basin and a small quantity of water. It has a pluvial regime and often dries up in summer. It features very diverse living environments and is home to a number of animal and plant species. The Dragonja has been a matter of a territorial dispute between Croatia and Slovenia, with its lowest portion de facto the border of the two countries.

== Course ==
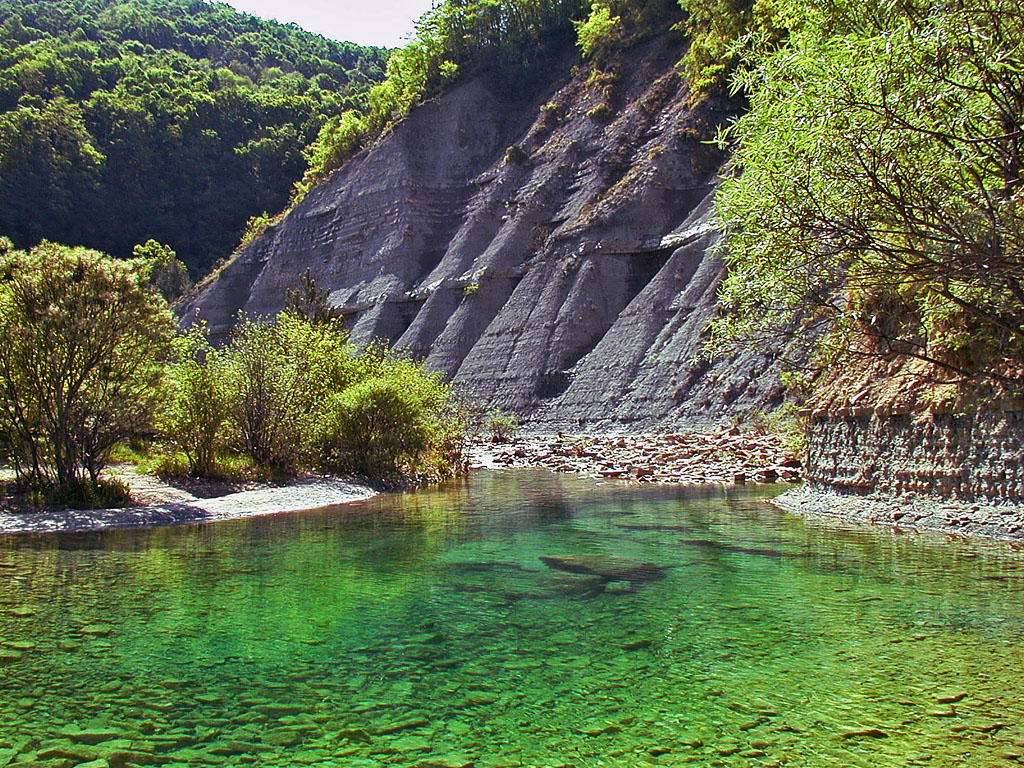
Flysch wall above the Dragonja

The river is the third-longest river in Istria, after the Raša and Mirna rivers. It is the largest river of the Slovenian coast that flows into the Adriatic Sea. It is also the only Slovenian river that does not flow through settlements and that flows in its entirety over the flysch terrain.

The Dragonja originates from several sources in the Šavrin Hills and flows west to the Gulf of Piran, part of the northern Adriatic Sea. It is joined by two larger tributaries from the right side (Rokava and the Drnica Creeks) and one larger tributary from the left side (Poganja Creek).

The Sečovlje Salina Landscape Park with the Sečovlje Saltworks is located at its mouth. The lowest part of the Dragonja in the Municipality of Piran has been protected since 1990 as a natural monument.

== Name ==
The Dragonja River was first attested in written sources as Argao (ablative Argaone), and in later sources as Argaone (in 670), per Argaonem (in 1035), Dragugne (in 1100), and super flumine Dragone (in 1389). The modern Slovene and Italian names (with initial D-) are derived from Slavic *Dorgon’a, from Romance d- (< ad 'at') + Argaon- (with metathesis). Ultimately, the name is of pre-Romance origin, presumably based on the Proto-Indo-European root *h_{2}arg’- 'shining'.

Non-linguistic accounts explain the name as based on the meandering course of the river, resembling a dragon (Italian: drago).

== Territorial dispute ==
In the lower reaches of the Dragonja, there is a territorial dispute between Slovenia and Croatia: while Croatian authorities claim that the Dragonja is a border river, Slovenia claims a strip of territory south to the river as well. As of 2012, the last 7 kilometres (4.3 miles) of Dragonja's course is de facto border of Croatia and Slovenia. The disputed territory contains four hamlets and Croatia's Plovanija border crossing. The Dragonja River became a district border river after World War II, when the Yugoslav-administered Zone B of the Free Territory of Trieste (FTT) was split into the Koper and Buje districts. After dissolution of the FTT in 1954 and transfer of its former Zone B to Yugoslavia, the Koper district became a part of Slovenia while the Buje district was attached to Croatia.
