= Seča =

Seča Sezza (Italian)
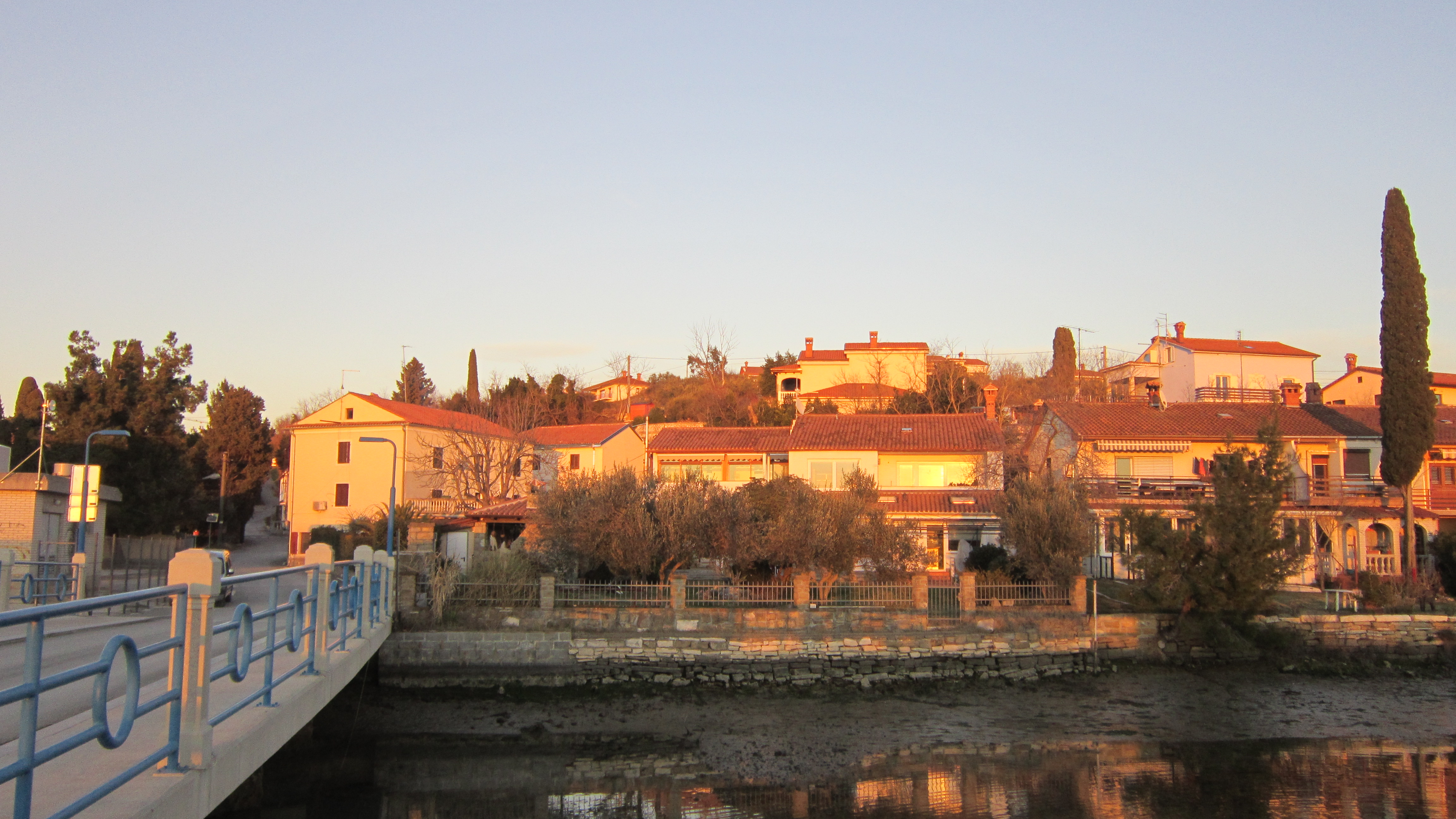

- Location in Slovenia
- Coordinates: 45°29′53.12″N 13°36′31.83″E
- Country: Slovenia
- Traditional region: Slovenian Littoral
- Statistical region: Coastal–Karst
- Municipality: Piran

Area
  - Total: 3.08 km^{2} (1.19 sq mi)
- Elevation: 64.2 m (211 ft)

Population (2002)
  - Total: 942

Seča (pronounced [ˈseːtʃa]; Italian: Sezza) is a settlement in the Municipality of Piran in the Littoral region of Slovenia.

== Name ==
The Slovene name of the settlement was changed from Sveti Jernej (literally, 'Saint Bartholomew') to Seča in 1958. The name was changed on the basis of the 1948 Law on Names of Settlements and Designations of Squares, Streets, and Buildings as part of efforts by Slovenia's postwar communist government to remove religious elements from toponyms.

== Church ==
The local church in the settlement is dedicated to Saint Bartholomew (Slovene: sveti Jernej).
