= Gulf of Koper =

- Koper Bay
- Koprski zaliv (Slovene)
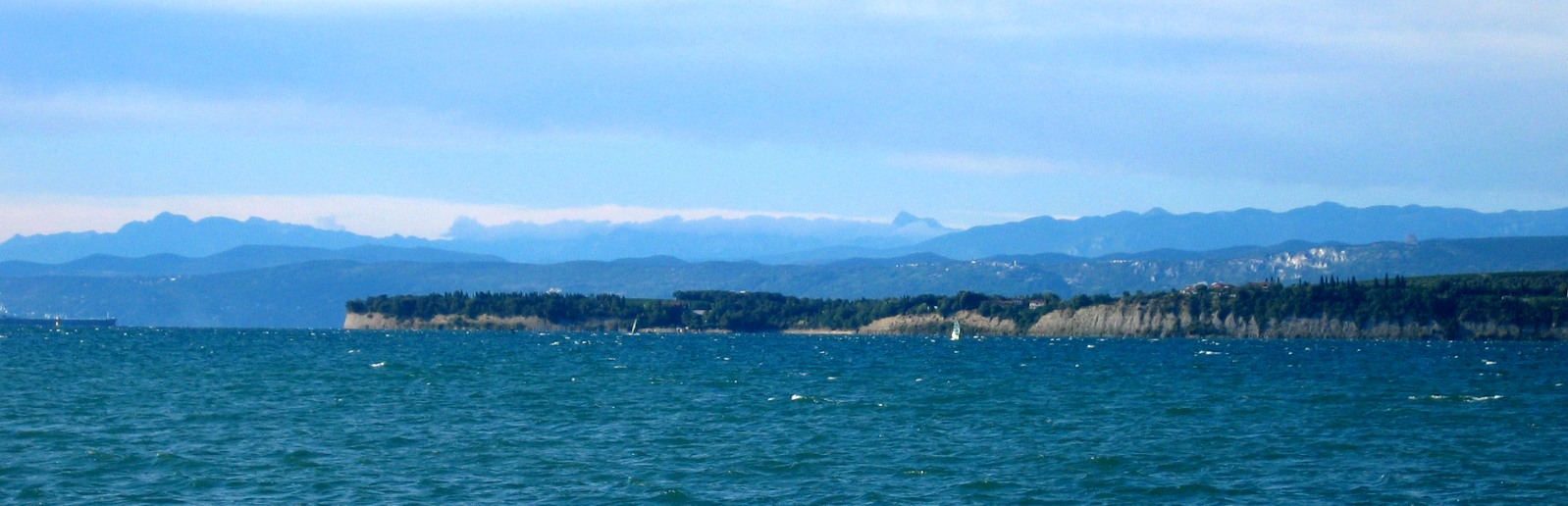
- Debeli Rtič, the northernmost point of the gulf, with the Triglav in background

- Location within Slovenia
- Location: Europe
- Coordinates: 45°33′N 13°44′E
- Basin countries: Slovenia
- Surface area: 18 km^{2} (6.9 sq mi)
- Settlements: Ankaran, Koper, Izola, Piran

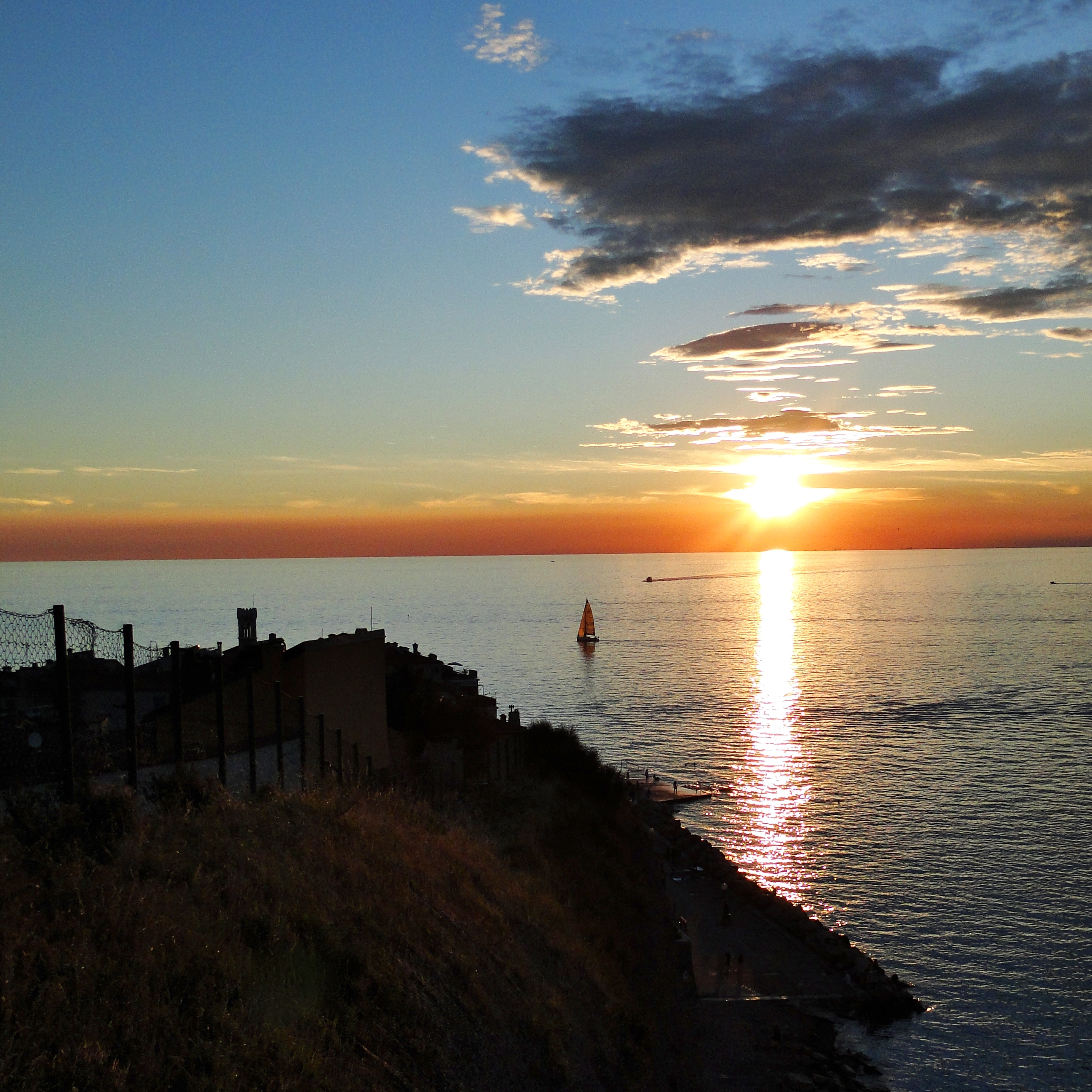
Rt Madona, the southernmost point of the gulf

The Gulf of Koper or Koper Bay (Slovene: Koprski zaliv, Croatian: Koprski zaljev, Italian: Golfo di Capodistria) is located in the northern part of the Adriatic Sea, and is the northern part of the Gulf of Trieste. It comprises several minor bays: the Ankaran Bay (with the Valdoltra Bay), the Semedela Bay, the Viližan Bay, the Simon Bay, the Moon Bay, and the Strunjan Bay. It covers an area of 18 square kilometres (6.9 sq mi). Since 1785, when the town of Koper was still on the island, the area of the bay has been reduced by about 4 km^{2} (1.5 sq mi) due to land reclamation.

== Overview ==
The gulf, named after the city of Koper, is part of the Slovene Riviera and is entirely located in Slovenian territory. Crossed by the river Rižana, it spans from Debeli Rtič, next to the borders with the Italian town of Muggia; to Rt Madona, a cape in the town of Piran, that is also the northernmost point of the Gulf of Piran. Two other streams flowing into the Gulf of Koper are Baševica in Koper and Strunjan Creek (Strunjanski potok) or Roja in Strunjan.

The towns of Koper, Izola and Piran (the northern shore), along with the villages of Ankaran, Bertoki, Jagodje, Dobrava, Strunjan and Fiesa, are located by the gulf.

== Ecological significance ==
The Gulf of Koper is an ecologically important area with over 1800 plant and animal species identified, among which the loggerhead sea turtle (Caretta caretta) and the common bottlenose dolphin (Tursiops truncatus). Near Žusterna, there is an underwater meadow of the Neptune grass (Posidonia oceanica ), which is included in the Natura 2000 network.

=== Strunjan nature park ===
The Strunjan nature park is a protected area of landscape on the Strunjan peninsula, which includes the Strunjan nature reserve, the Stjuža nature reserve, which is the only lagoon on the Slovenian coast, and a stone pine tree avenue along the main road linking Izola to Sečovlje.

The Strunjan nature reserve features the flysch Strunjan cliff with a height of 80 meters (260 ft), in front of which lies the Moon Bay (Mesečev zaliv). The reserve covers an area of 160 hectares (400 acres), including a coastal strip of 200 m (660 ft) of the sea. The Strunjan cliff is the largest known flysch wall on the entire Adriatic coast. Its lower part is eroded by the sea, whereas the upper part is subjected to weather conditions. This results in interesting geological and geomorphological features, such as rock shelters, microtectonic faults, faulted rock blocks and oblique layers of rock.

On the upper edge of the cliff, in erosion gullies and elsewhere where the slope of the terrain allows, a typical deciduous sub-Mediterranean community of the European hop-hornbeam (Ostrya carpinifolia) and autumn moor grass (Sesleria autumnalis) has developed, with dense occurrences of the weaver's broom (Spartium junceum) and the giant cane (Arundo donax) also occurring in the upper part of the cliff. On the slopes of Cape Ronek, where, despite its northern location and predominantly loess substrate, typical Mediterranean plants also occur: the common myrtle (Myrtus communis) and the strawberry tree (Arbutus unedo), for which Cape Ronek is the only indigenous site in Slovenia.

=== Škocjan Inlet ===
A former bay of the Gulf of Koper is the Škocjan Inlet (Škocjanski zatok). This wetland is a residue of the sea that once encircled Koper. It covers an area of 122 hectares (300 acres) and contains brackish water with salinity between freshwater and sea. The location has extraordinary ornithological significance, where ca. 200 bird species have been observed, including the little bittern (Ixobrychus minutus), the black-crowned night heron (Nycticorax nycticorax), the squacco heron (Ardeola ralloides), the spotted crake (Porzana porzana), the wood sandpiper (Tringa glareola), the Mediterranean gull (Larus melanocephalus), and the moustached warbler (Acrocephalus melanopogon).

=== Shell dune near Ankaran ===
The shell dune in Polje bay/sea inlet between Koper and Ankaran is the only shell dune in Slovenia. It is located in the immediate vicinity of the Port of Koper, north of the mouth of the Rižana River. The shell dune was created after 1990, when the Port of Koper dredged the second harbour quay and pumped silt from the seabed to a nearby location next to the outlet of the Rižana River into the Adriatic Sea. Rain gradually washed the mud from the sludge piles, leaving only the calcareous shells of molluscs.

== Economy ==
=== Port of Koper ===
The Port of Koper (Luka Koper) is the main port that serves the route between the Adriatic Sea and Central Europe. The core business covers cargo handling and warehousing services for all types of goods, complemented by a range of additional services for cargo with the aim of providing a comprehensive logistics support for customers.

=== Salt production ===
An important economic activity for a major part of the history of the Gulf of Koper was salt production. The Koper salt pans were first mentioned in the 12th century and were managed by the residents of Koper under the Venetian rule.

The Strunjan Saltpans are minor saltpans located in Strunjan. These are the northernmost saltpans in the Mediterranean and the smallest in the Adriatic, where salt has been traditionally extracted for more than 700 years.

=== Fishing ===
Fishing for the most part developed in the town of Izola. The traditional vessels are well presented in the Izolana Museum. In 1879, the Frenchman Emilie Louis Roullet built the first fish processing and canning factory in Izola. The company was called Societe Generale Francaise, and began operating on 20 January 1881. A second factory was built by Warhanek from Vienna and began operating on 22 December 1882. The import-export Delamaris company, dealing with fresh and canned fish, was established in 1952. In 2013, the fish processing industry moved to Kal near Pivka.

== See also ==
- Gulf of Piran
- Gulf of Venice
- Gulf of Trieste
