= Nožed =

- Location in Slovenia
- Coordinates: 45°29′49.35″N 13°38′1.75″E
- Country: Slovenia
- Traditional region: Littoral
- Statistical region: Coastal–Karst
- Municipality: Izola

Area
  - Total: 0.54 km^{2} (0.21 sq mi)
- Elevation: 213.4 m (700 ft)

Population (2002)
  - Total: 48

Nožed (pronounced [ˈnoːʒɛt]; Italian: Nosedo) is a small settlement in the Municipality of Izola in the Littoral region of Slovenia.

== History ==
Nožed became a separate settlement in 1997, when it was split off from the territory of Malija.
