= Fiesso =

Fiesso is an Italian place name that may refer to:

- Fiesa, Portorož, a street in the settlement of Portorož on the Adriatic coast in southwestern Slovenia
- Fiesso, a former village and now a hamlet of Prato in the Municipality of Prato (Leventina), in southeastern Switzerland
- Fiesso, a frazione of Castenaso, Italy
