= Slovenian patrol boat Triglav =

Slovenian patrol boat

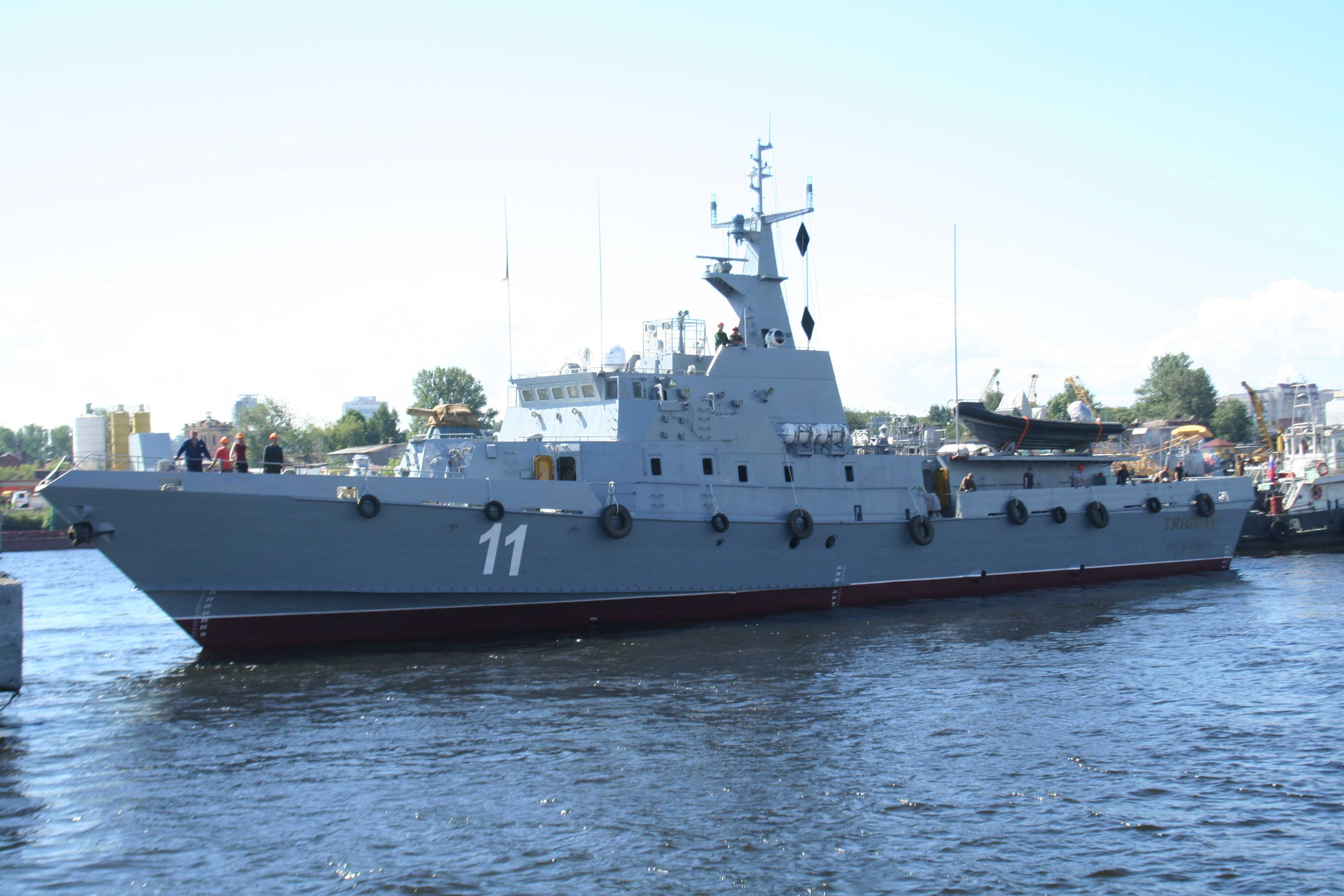
- Slovenian patrol boat Triglav

History

Slovenia
- Name: Triglav
- Namesake: Triglav
- Builder: Almaz shipbuilding company
- Launched: 2010
- Commissioned: 2011
- Home port: Port of Koper
- Status: Active

General characteristics
- Class & type: Svetlyak-class patrol boat
- Displacement: 375 tons full load
- Length: 49.5 m (162 ft 5 in)
- Beam: 9.2 m (30 ft 2 in)
- Draught: 2.2 m (7 ft 3 in)
- Propulsion: 3 × MTU 400 diesel engines, 16,200 hp (12,100 kW)
- Speed: 30 knots (56 km/h; 35 mph) max
- Range: 2,200 nmi (4,074 km; 2,532 mi) at 13 knots (24 km/h; 15 mph)
- Endurance: 10 days
- Complement: 24 (4 officers)
- Armament: 1 × 30mm AK-306 (bow section, before 2025 update); 1 × 30mm ASELSAN SMASH 200/30 RCWS (after 2025 update); 6 × 9M120 anti-ship missile system; 16 × Igla-1M MANPADS; 2 × 14.5 mm machine guns
- Notes: Diving chamber

Triglav is a Svetlyak-class patrol boat operated by the 430th Naval Section of the Slovenian Armed Forces. It is a small, multi-role craft capable of maritime patrol, supporting diver operations, coastal survey, search and rescue and combat. It has twice been deployed outside Slovenian territorial waters in concert with other NATO naval forces.

== History ==
In 2008, Slovenia agreed to the acquisition of one Project 10412-class patrol boat (export version of Svetlyak-class patrol boat) in exchange for discharging a multimillion-dollar debt owed by Russia. The ship was laid down in 2009, completed in 2011, and delivered to Slovenia the same year. It was named Triglav after Slovenia's highest mountain and national symbol. The ship's armament was optimized for a patrol role, lacking the anti-ship missiles of the standard Svetlyak. In late 2012, this capability was restored by mounting six 9M120 anti-ship missiles. In summer 2015, Triglav underwent an overhaul in the Trieste shipyard.

In 2024 it was announced that Triglav was to undergo a major update to extend its service life and capabilities. The updated vessel was delivered in 2025.

== Deployments ==
Triglav was sent to eastern Sicily on 15 December 2013 to assist Italy with refugees from Africa as part of Operation Mare Nostrum.

In October 2015, the vessel was sent to southern Italy as a part of the European Union's Operation Sophia. Triglav successfully carried out its first rescue operation on 28 October, recovering 100 people (71 male, 17 female, and 12 children).

In May 2018 the ship suffered a major engine breakdown at the start of its deployment to the Mediterranean.

== Armament & equipment ==
- 1x AK-306 gun mount (AK-176M gun can be mounted in the bow section); before 2025 update
- 1× ASELSAN SMASH 200/30 RCWS, which uses a 30x173mm NATO autocannon; after 2025 update
- 2x 14.5mm machine guns
- 6x 9M120 anti-ship missile system
- 16x Igla-type MANPADS
- PK-10 anti-missile projectiles
- FR-2150W navigational radar
- Gorizont-25 integrated navigation system
- GAGK1 Pastilshchik-D gyroazimuth/horizon compass
- KM-69M1 magnetic compass
- LEMM-2-2 electromagnetic log with echosounder functions
- AP-5 dead-reckoning tracer
- RN-1 radio range-finder
- KPI-9F receiver-indicator of ground-based radio-navigation systems
- NT-200D shipborne satellite navigation equipment
- Buran-6E automated communications system
