= Svetlyak-class patrol boat =

Class of patrol boats

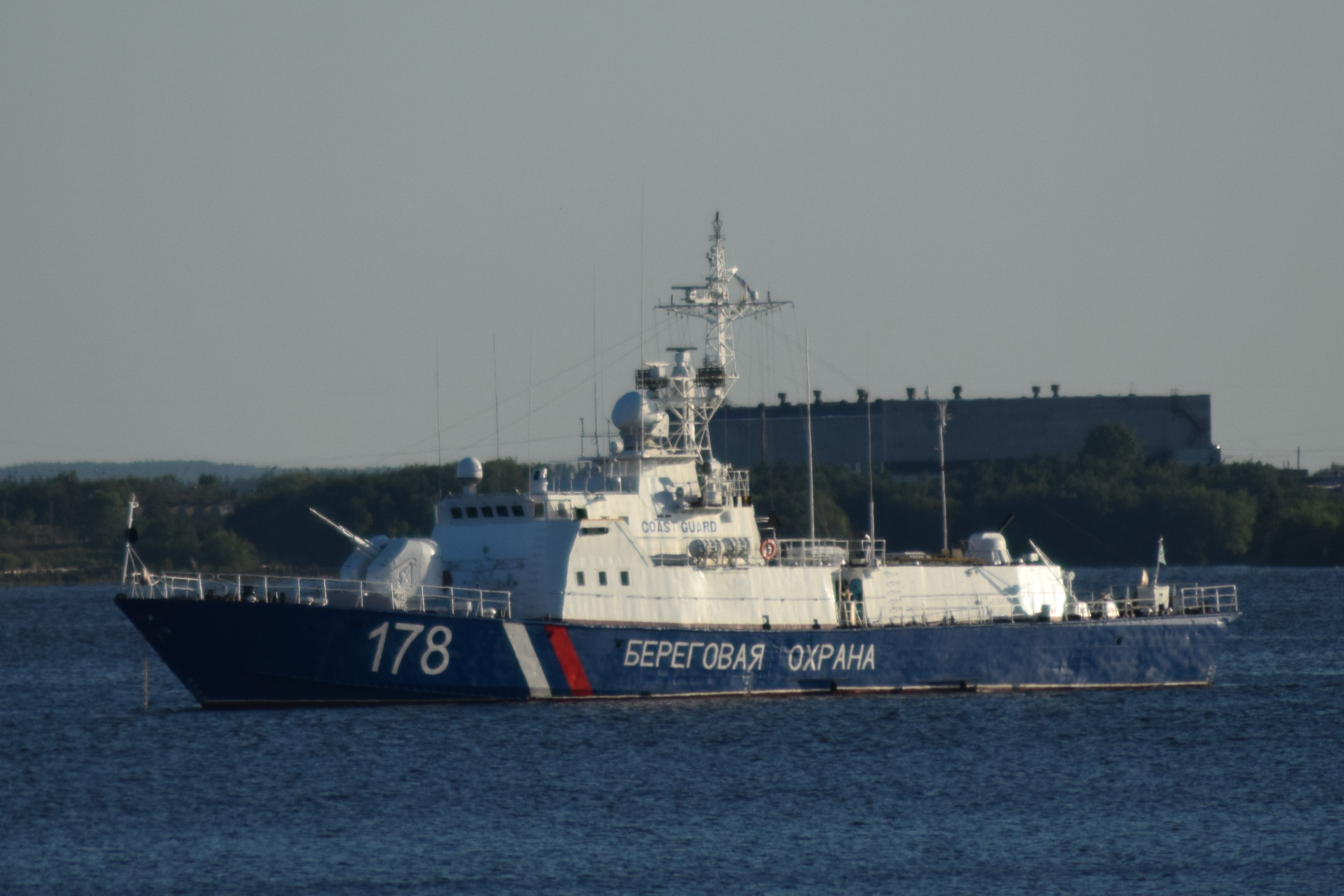
- A Svetlyak-class patrol boat in Russian Coast Guard service.

Class overview
- Name: Svetlyak class
- Builders: Vostochnaya Verf; Yaroslavsky Shipbuilding Plant; Almaz Shipbuilding Company
- Operators: Russian Navy; Russian Coast Guard; Vietnam People's Navy; Slovenian Navy
- Succeeded by: Rubin class
- Subclasses: Project 10412
- Built: 1987–present
- In commission: 1988–present
- Planned: 51
- Building: 2
- Completed: 50
- Active: 33 (at least one possibly damaged in the Black Sea in 2026)
- Retired: 16

General characteristics
- Type: Fast patrol boat
- Displacement: 375 t (369 long tons; 413 short tons)
- Length: 49.2 m (161 ft 5 in)
- Beam: 9.2 m (30 ft 2 in)
- Draft: 2.63 m (8 ft 8 in)
- Propulsion: 3 x Zvezda ZE M520 diesel engines with 5,440 hp (4,060 kW) each 3 fixed pitch propellers, 1x200 kW DGFA-200/1500 diesel-generator, 2x100 kW DGFA-100/1500 diesel-generators
- Speed: 28–32 knots (52–59 km/h; 32–37 mph)
- Range: 1,500–1,600 nmi (2,800–3,000 km; 1,700–1,800 mi) at 13 knots (24 km/h; 15 mph)
- Endurance: 10 days
- Crew: 28
- Sensors & processing systems: MR-212/201-1 Vaygach-U or MR-212/201-03 Vaygach or Liman or MR-2PV Baltika-M or MR-231 or MR-415.4 Poisk navigation radar; MG-7 Braslet or MG-747 Amulet-3 anti-saboteur sonar; MG-349M Rosy-K sonar; Khrom IFF
- Electronic warfare & decoys: Slyabing ECM complex
- Armament: 1 × AK-176M naval gun (152 rounds); 1 or 2 × AK-630M CIWSs; 1 × Igla-1M surface-to-air missiles (16 missiles); 2 × 14,5 mm gun carriages; 2 × MRG-1 or DP-64 grenade launchers; 2 × KL-101 or KT-216 launchers for PK-16 decoys

The Svetlyak class, Russian designation Project 10410 Svetlyak, is a class of patrol boats designed and built in the Soviet Union and later in Russia, and currently being used primarily by the Russian Navy and Russian Coast Guard.

One vessel of the class, serving in the Black Sea, was reported by Ukrainian sources to have been attacked and damaged in the port of Kerch in July 2026.

== Design ==
The patrol boats of the class are designed to carry out a variety of missions, from patrol missions to prevent violations of maritime state border, to protect friendly vessels and facilities from enemy surface and air attacks. The patrol boats are constructed with a steel hull and aluminum superstructure. The boats have NBC warfare protection and can survive with two compartments flooded. The patrol boats engine room is coated with a vibration damping material.

== Variants ==
- Project 10410 – a version operated by Soviet and later Russian Coast Guard.
- Project 10411 – an export missile boat version armed with eight Kh-35 (SS-N-25 'Switchblade') anti-ship missiles.
- Project 10412 – an export version for Slovenia and Vietnam.

== Operators ==
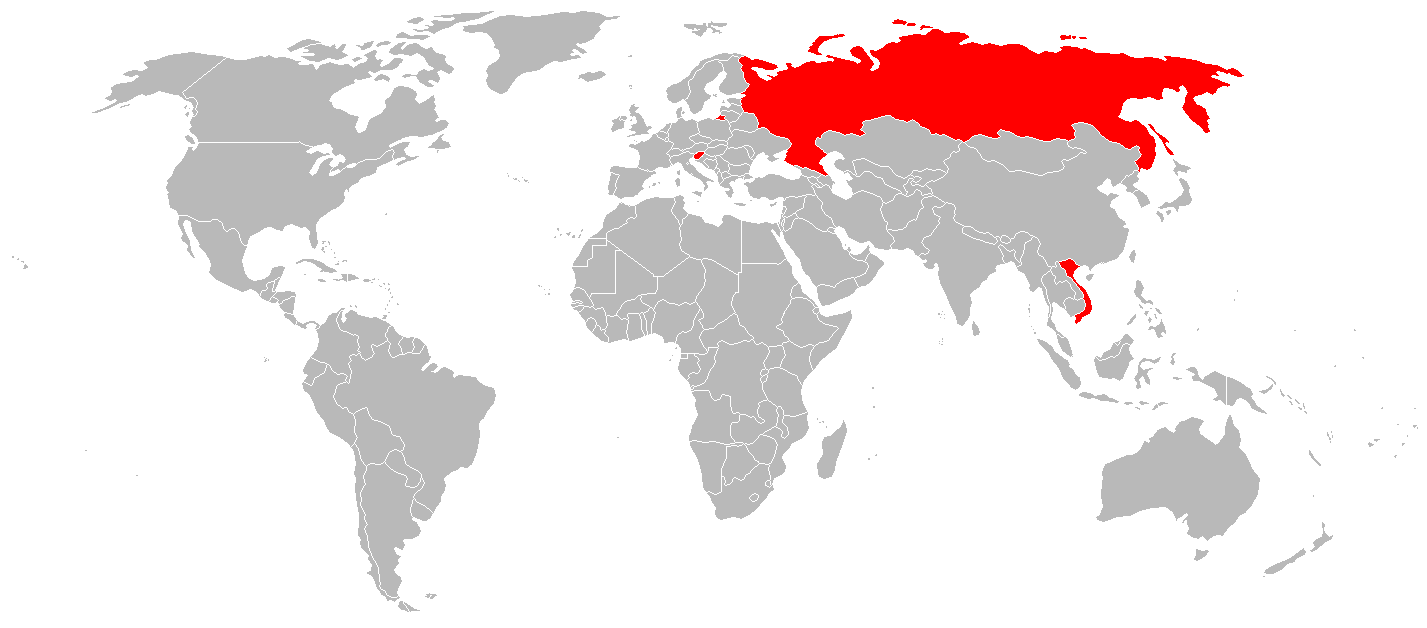
Svetlyak class patrol boat users

Russia

- Russian Navy
- Russian Coast Guard

Slovenia

- Slovenian Navy (1 ship, named Triglav)

Vietnam

- Vietnam People's Navy

== See also ==
- List of ships of the Soviet Navy
- List of ships of Russia by project number
