= Fiesa =

Fiesa may refer to:

- Fiesa, Portorož, a street in the settlement of Portorož on the Adriatic coast in southwestern Slovenia
- the International Sand Sculpture Festival (FIESA), held annually in Pêra, Algarve
