= 2016 Izola general hospital shooting =

List of massacres in Slovenia

- Location: 45°32′40″N 13°41′11″E; Izola General Hospital, Izola, Slovenia
- Date: 22 August 2016
- Attack type: Mass shooting; Spree killing; Murder–suicide
- Weapon: Pistol
- Deaths: 3 (including the perpetrator)
- Injuries: 1
- Perpetrator: Darko Gregorič
- Motive: Personal grudges

On 22 August 2016, shortly after 3 p.m., Darko Gregorič entered the Izola General Hospital, allegedly using a crutch to help him walk. He was looking for a specific person, namely doctor Guilermo Martinez. A 43-year-old police officer was also present at the time, who was supposed to have come to the hospital to escort the prisoner for an examination. When the perpetrator saw the police officer, he shot the police officer and the doctor, both of whom succumbed to their injuries. In front of the hospital, he wounded another police officer who arrived at the scene. In front of the hospital entrance, he sat down and exchanged his gun (obtained from the shot police officer). The perpetrator is said to have fired another shot into the air at this point and walked towards the parking lot. He committed suicide in front of the hospital, shooting himself with a policeman's gun. The police never found out where Gregorič got his gun, but they found a large number of bullets at his home.

Among the motives, Slovenian and coastal media cited the death of the perpetrator's mother, money problems and excessive drinking. It later emerged that the motive for the showdown was dissatisfaction with the course of treatment, but the analysis confirmed that there were no irregularities.
