= Ankaran =

Ankaran Ancarano (Italian)
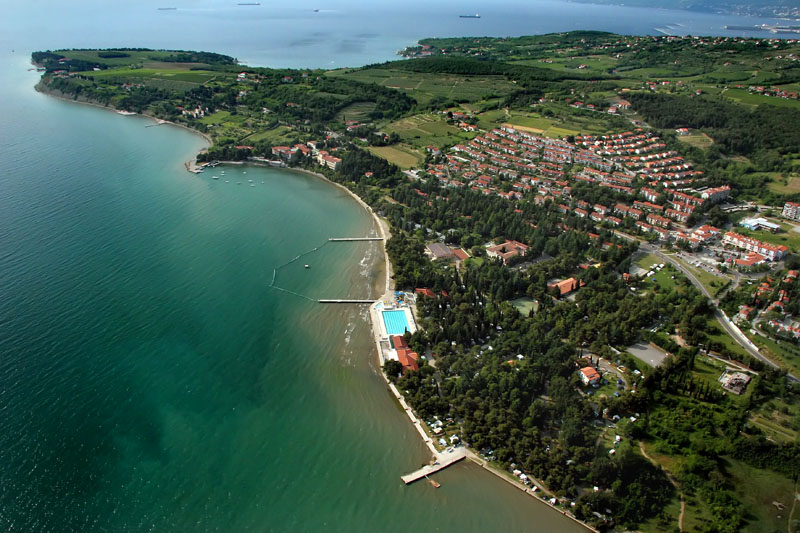

- Flag Coat of arms

- Location in Slovenia
- Coordinates: 45°34′45.53″N 13°44′16.54″E
- Country: Slovenia
- Traditional region: Littoral
- Statistical region: Coastal–Karst
- Municipality: Ankaran

Government
  - Mayor: Gregor Strmčnik (Independent)

Area
  - Total: 5.3 km^{2} (2.0 sq mi)
- Elevation: 19.2 m (63 ft)

Population (2011)
  - Total: 3,278
  - Density: 619/km^{2} (1,600/sq mi)
- Time zone: UTC+1 (CET)
  - Summer (DST): UTC+2 (CEST)
- Postal code: 6280
- Area code: +386 (0)5
- Climate: Cfa
- Website: Official website

Ankaran (Slovene pronunciation: [aŋkaˈɾáːn]; Italian: Ancarano) is a town in the Municipality of Ankaran, located near the border with Italy, in the Littoral region of Slovenia. It is less than 5 km from the Italian town of Muggia near Trieste, about 2.5 km from the Italian-Slovenian border, 6.5 km from Koper, and 33 km from the nearest Croatian town, Buje. In the entire municipality both Slovenian and Italian are official languages.

== Geography ==
The town of Ankaran is located at the south end of the Muggia Peninsula (sometimes also called the Ankaran Peninsula) at the northwest end of Istria, and extends across the territory of former village of Ankaran, Valdoltra, and Debeli Rtič (Italian: Punta Grossa). It is the northernmost of all the coastal settlements of the Slovenian Riviera and one of the last settlements in Istria before the Karst region. In ancient times it was one of the most important routes along the Adriatic coast. The Mediterranean climate allows grape and olive cultivation.

== Name ==
Ankaran was attested in written sources in 1700 as Ancaran. The Slovenian name is borrowed from Italian Ancarano (dialect Ancaràn), which is derived from the name Ancharius and therefore means 'property of Ancharius'. Additional settlements in Italy with the same name origin include Ancarano, Ancaiano (in Tolentino), and Ancharano (in Tuscany). During Roman times, the area of today's Ankaran was probably known as Ultra—literally, 'across (the bay)'—referring to the perspective from Koper.

== History ==
In the Roman Empire, an outpost named Ancarano, whose ruins are still visible in Božiči, was established next to a road that ran from Trieste (Tergeste) through Škofije, between Tinjan Hill and the Milje hills through Bivje (where ruins of it are still visible) towards central Istria. Artifacts found below Srmin Hill during excavations date from Roman, or possibly even Ancient Greek times.

In the 9th century a Trieste bishop ordered a small church to be built in Gasello dedicated to Saint Apollinare del Gasello. In 1072, Bishop Adalger gave the church of Saint Apollinare with surrounding properties to the Benedictine Monastery of Saint Niccolo of Venice. The Benedictines expanded their territory toward Koper and down to Poreč throughout the western part of Istria. The monastery was expanded several times, and later renamed to San Niccolo (Slovene: Sveti Nikolaj). Gradually a few farms emerged around the main complex, and the monastery itself promoted grape and olive cultivation. The San Niccolo wines were sold to the Duchy of Milan and trading was conducted in the 16th century even to the German lands as Lacrimae Christi wines. Apparently the monastery also produced olive oil because olive oil storage tanks were found near today's Hotel Convent. In 1572 a Guelf-style belltower was built on the complex itself, and the church gained a new name: San Niccolo d'Oltre, later San Niccolo d'Oltra, to distinguish it from its Koper counterpart.

In 1630 and 1631 the plague greatly reduced the population in the broader area and caused mass abandonment of the monastery complex, with the last ordained monk leaving in 1641. Bishop Zenon complained of alleged immoral behaviour of the monks residing there. From that point on, the buildings served only as a residence for the Benedictine Order. San Niccolo also served as an artwork storage facility from the 14th to 18th century, when the works mysteriously disappeared after official dissolution of the monastery by the Venetian Republic in 1774. In the same year it was purchased the Madonizza family of Koper and remade into their summer residence.

During Napoleon's Illyrian Provinces, a military hospital was established and later the Austrian Empire remade the settlement into a therapy center for their naval officers. In 1818 a book was published in Regensburg by Heinrich Hoppe and Friederich Hornschuh praising the local climate as being effective for recovery from injuries and illnesses. Because of the increased popularity of the facility, a well was built on the outer terrace in 1835 by Bonifazio (from Piran) and Dominic (from Korte).

In 1880, three arches with a stairwell were built on the front entry of the complex to offer visitors a better view of the courtyard. From that point until the First World War, it mainly offered healthcare services. In 1909, the Valdotra Sanatorium for pulmonary tuberculosis and a seaside convalescent hospital for children were built. This was renovated by the American Red Cross after the war, and in 1925 some capacities of San Niccolo were used as a hotel, together with the playgrounds and the San Niccolo swimming site.

After the Second World War, the Hotel-Camp Adria Complex was built near the monastery, and the building of the seaside convalescent hospital for children was occupied by the Valdotra Orthopedic Hospital. At Debeli Rtič another facility for treating young people was established. The Ankaran Hospital also owned some premises in the tuberculosis sanatorium, but moved to the Izola Hospital in 1985. On the basis of this activities and business, many residential buildings for workers began appearing around these facilities, especially after the Second World War, and gradually the settlement began to thrive.

== Tourism ==
The mild climate sparked the development of health resorts in the late 19th century. Tourism begun to develop when the monastery was converted into a hotel. The Ankaran's camping site was claimed to be the most clean among camping sites on Slovenian coastline. By the St. Katerina is a learning trail, including the only salty meadow in Mediterranean.

== Valdoltra Orthopedic Hospital ==
In 1884, the Society of the Friends of Children (Italian: Società degli amici dell'infanzia, Slovene: Društvo prijateljev otrok) was established in Trieste, with the aim of aiding poor and ill children. The society opened a preschool in Trieste, established food distribution in schools, administered of vacation camps (such as the one in Hrpelje, opened in 1899), and was engaged in other activities, but its main concern was ill children. Its summer treatment facilities for ill children were insufficient for effective treatment, and so it began searching for new facilities nearby in 1904, after closing the Saint Andre facility in Trieste in 1903. When searching for facilities, the fate of the society was uncertain until the Society for the Fight against Tuberculosis (Italian: Società per la lotta contro la tubercolosi, Slovene: Društvo za boj proti tuberkulozi), also from Trieste, offered its property in Ankaran for rebuilding the treatment programme, while the Austrian Red Cross supplied two mobile units. For the first 20 years the facilities were run by Emilio Comisso, a pioneer in orthopedic treatment, together with 64 other employees. In 1912 there were three doctors, twenty nurses and eight nuns, and six families were in charge of growing food. In 1914 the complex already had 300 beds. Both world wars severely harmed the treatment facilities and, after the dissolution of Free Territory of Trieste into Italy and Yugoslavia, major renovations and upgrades took place. After Slovenia gained independence 1991, treatment thrived, with 50% of all state orthopedic activities being carried out at Valdoltra. Various new cooperation with international centres emerged, and the facility gradually even became an educational centre. Today, Valdotra is the headquarters of the Valdoltra Orthopedic Hospital, which also has a centre for sports rehabilitation.

== Navy home ==
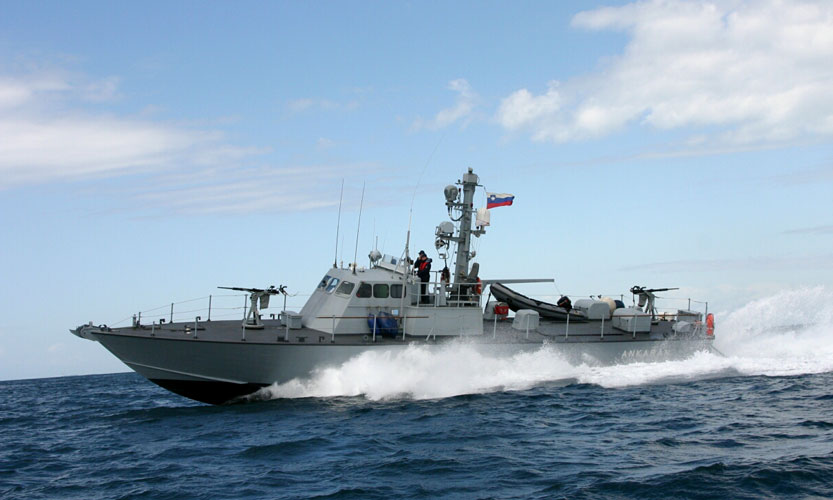
The Slovenian patrol boat Ankaran

In the part closest to the Port of Koper, the Slovenian Naval Barracks (in the former tuberculosis sanatorium building) became the home base of the Slovenian Navy in 1999. In 1996, after the lifting of the United Nations embargo, Slovenia purchased a Super Dvora Mk II class patrol boat patrol boat and named it after Ankaran.

== See also ==
- Debeli Rtič
