= Baredi =

- Location in Slovenia
- Coordinates: 45°31′3.66″N 13°40′30.63″E
- Country: Slovenia
- Traditional region: Littoral
- Statistical region: Coastal–Karst
- Municipality: Izola

Area
  - Total: 2.44 km^{2} (0.94 sq mi)
- Elevation: 189.1 m (620 ft)

Population (2002)
  - Total: 88

Baredi (pronounced [baˈɾeːdi]; Italian: Barè) is a settlement in the Municipality of Izola in the Littoral region of Slovenia.
