= Municipality of Izola =

Municipality of Slovenia

Municipality of Izola Občina Izola, Comune di Isola
- Municipality
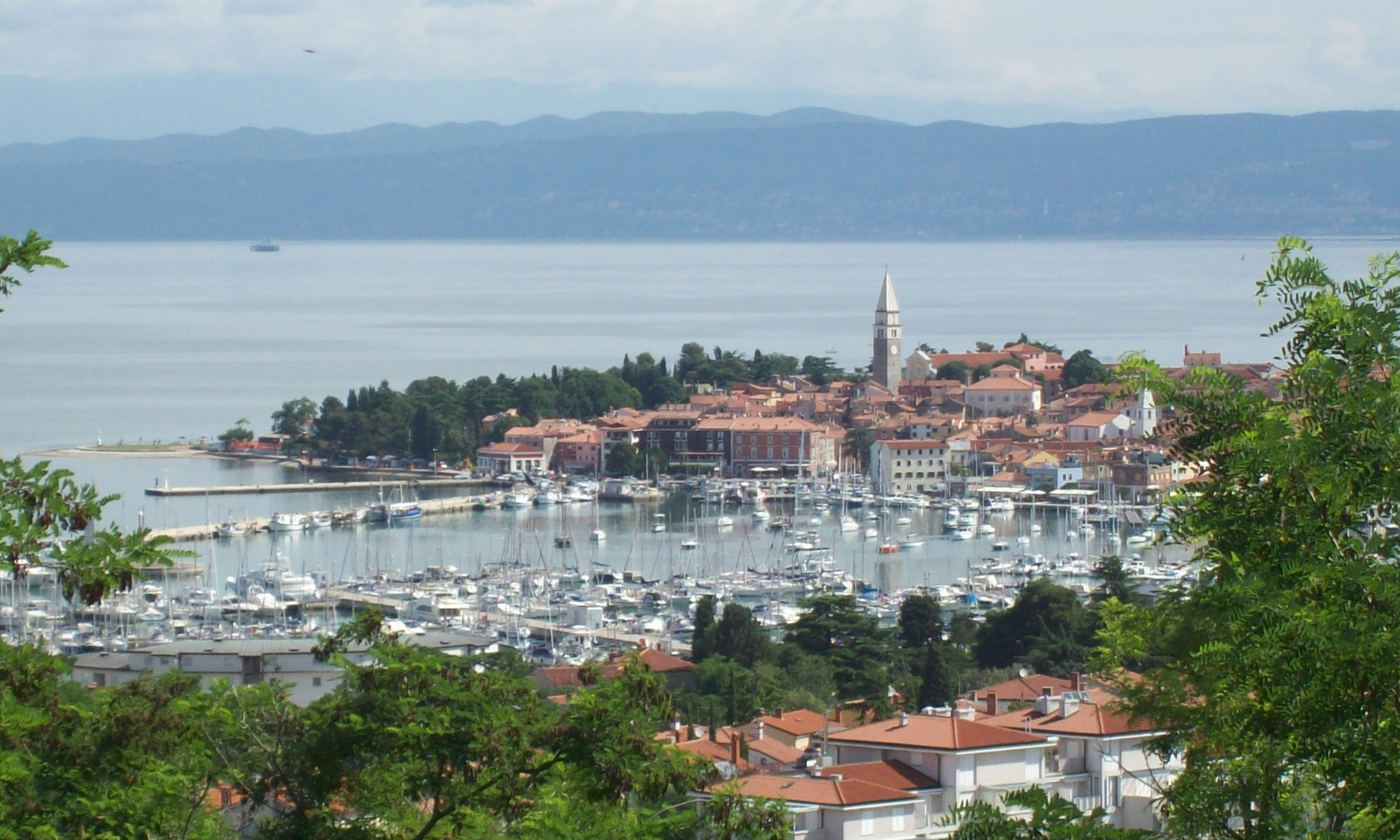

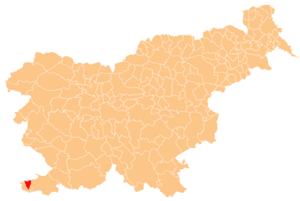
- Location of the Municipality of Izola in Slovenia
- Coordinates: 45°31′N 13°39′E
- Country: Slovenia

Government
  - Mayor: Danilo Markočič (Independent)

Area
  - Total: 28.6 km^{2} (11.0 sq mi)

Population (2016)
  - Total: 15,920
  - Density: 557/km^{2} (1,440/sq mi)
- Time zone: UTC+01 (CET)
  - Summer (DST): UTC+02 (CEST)
- Website: izola.si

The Municipality of Izola (Slovene pronunciation: [ˈiːzɔla]; Slovene: Občina Izola, Italian: Comune di Isola) is a municipality in the traditional region of the Littoral in southwestern Slovenia. The seat of the municipality is the town of Izola. Izola became a municipality in 1994.

The municipality of Izola is officially bilingual, with both Slovene and Italian as official languages; however, Slovene de facto dominates in all aspects, being the sole official language of the government and business.

== Settlements ==
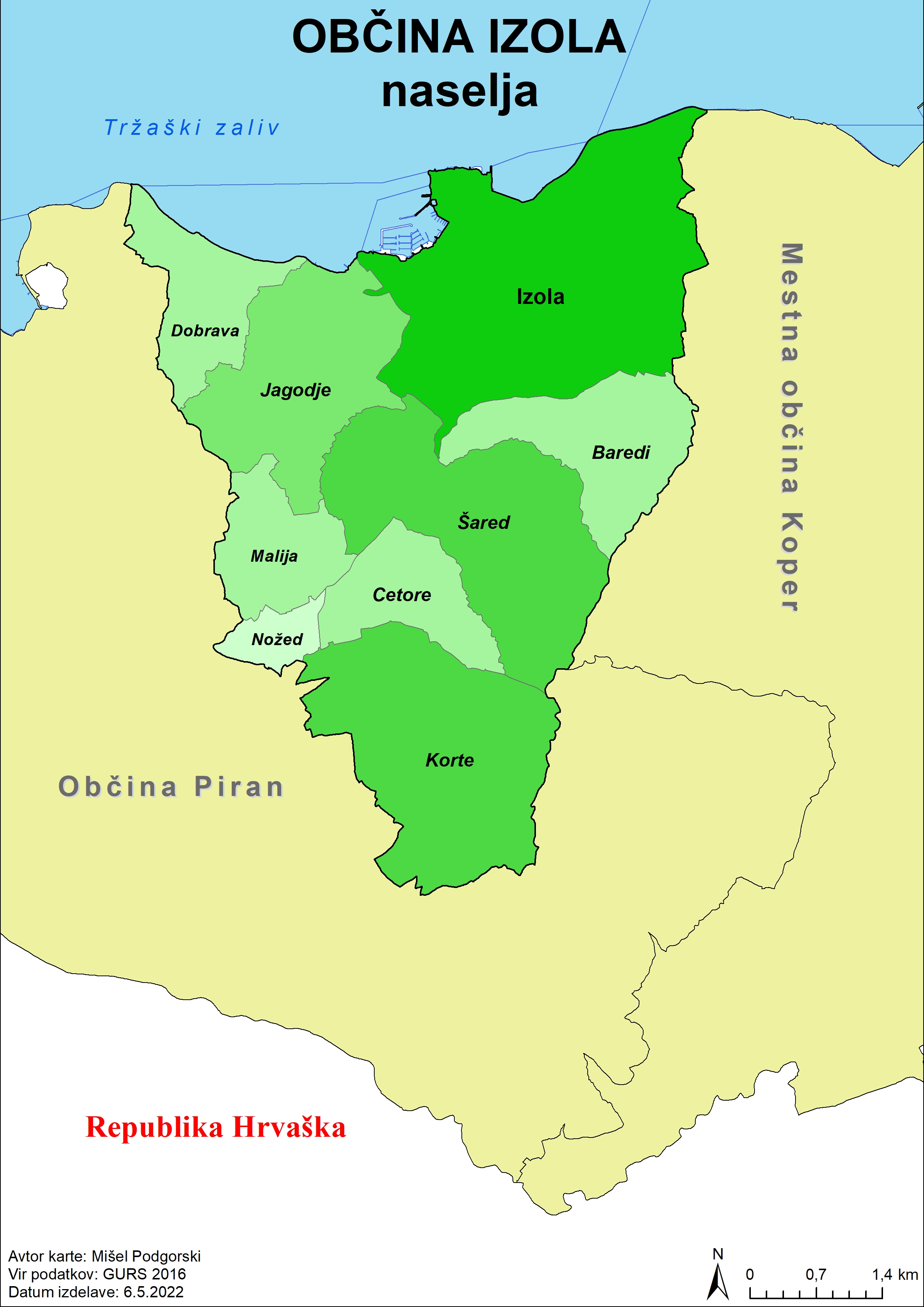
Villages in the municipality

In addition to the municipal seat of Izola, the municipality also includes the following settlements:

- Baredi
- Cetore (Italian: Settore)
- Dobrava
- Jagodje (Italian: Valleggia)
- Korte (Italian: Corte)
- Malija (Italian: Malio)
- Nožed (Italian: Nosedo)
- Šared (Italian: Saredo)

== Population ==
The municipality has 15,900 inhabitants. There are marginally more males (8,000) than females (7,900). By native language, the vast majority of the population is native speakers of Slovene (10,059), followed by Croatian (1,199), Italian (620), and other smaller minorities.

Population by native language, 2002 census
Slovenian 10,059 (69.14%)
Croatian 1,199 (8.24%)
Italian 620 (4.26%)
Serbo-Croatian 562 (3.86%)
Bosnian 537 (3.69%)
Serbian 385 (2.65%)
Macedonian 124 (0.85%)
Hungarian 19 (0.13%)
German 10 (0.07%)
Others or unknown 941 (6.47%)
Total 14,549
