= Šared =

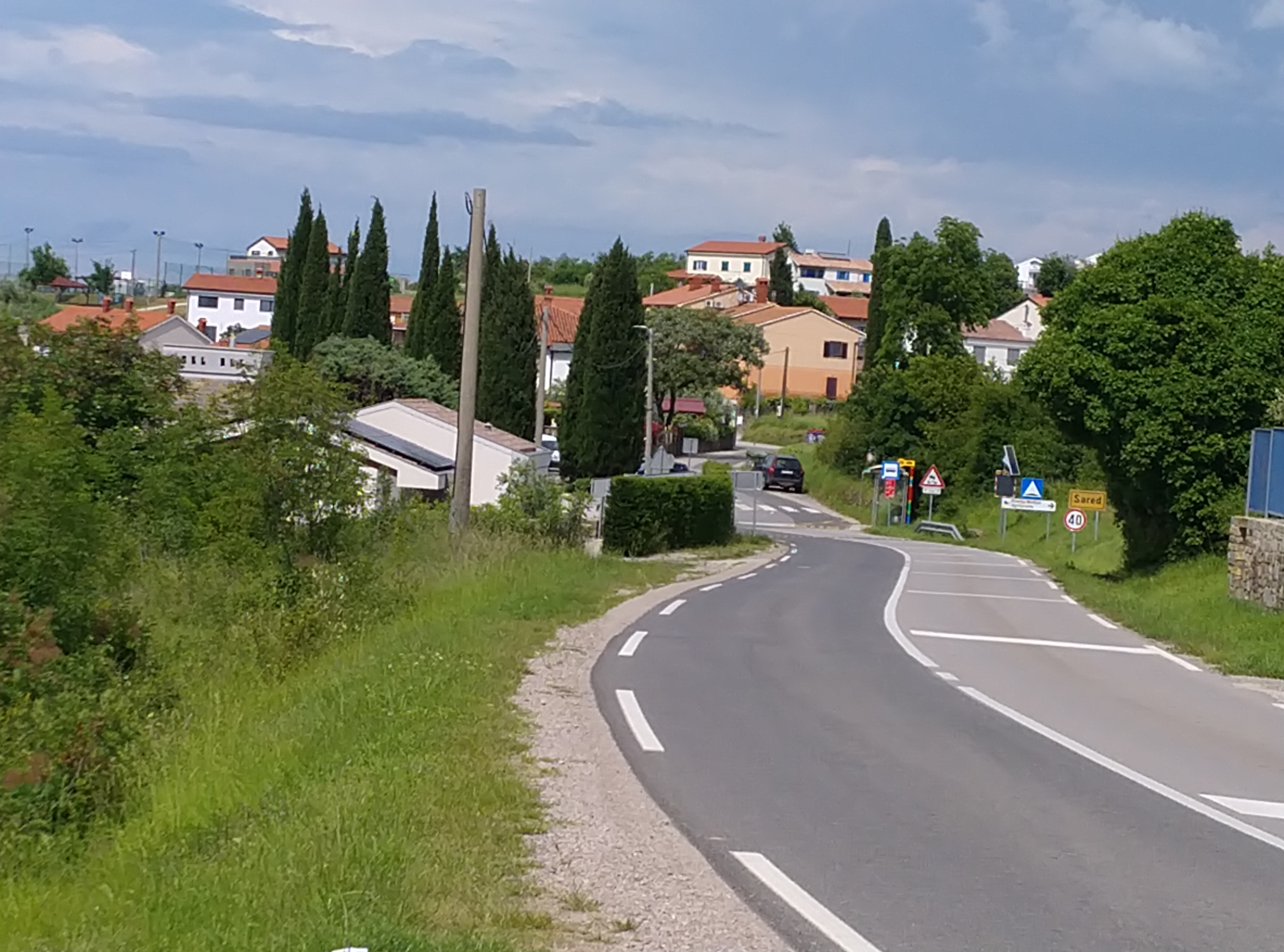
- View of Šared from the southwest

- Location in Slovenia
- Coordinates: 45°30′51.69″N 13°39′8.44″E
- Country: Slovenia
- Traditional region: Littoral
- Statistical region: Coastal–Karst
- Municipality: Izola

Area
  - Total: 4.75 km^{2} (1.83 sq mi)
- Elevation: 209.8 m (688 ft)

Population (2002)
  - Total: 508

Šared (pronounced [ʃaˈɾeːt]; Italian: Saredo, formerly San Giacomo) is a village in the Municipality of Izola in Slovene Istria and the Littoral region of Slovenia.

== Church ==
The local church, built outside the settlement, is dedicated to Saint James. The church was damaged after the Second World War and abandoned. It was renovated in 2003.
