= Haliaetum =

Coordinates: 45°32′0.61″N 13°38′48.83″E

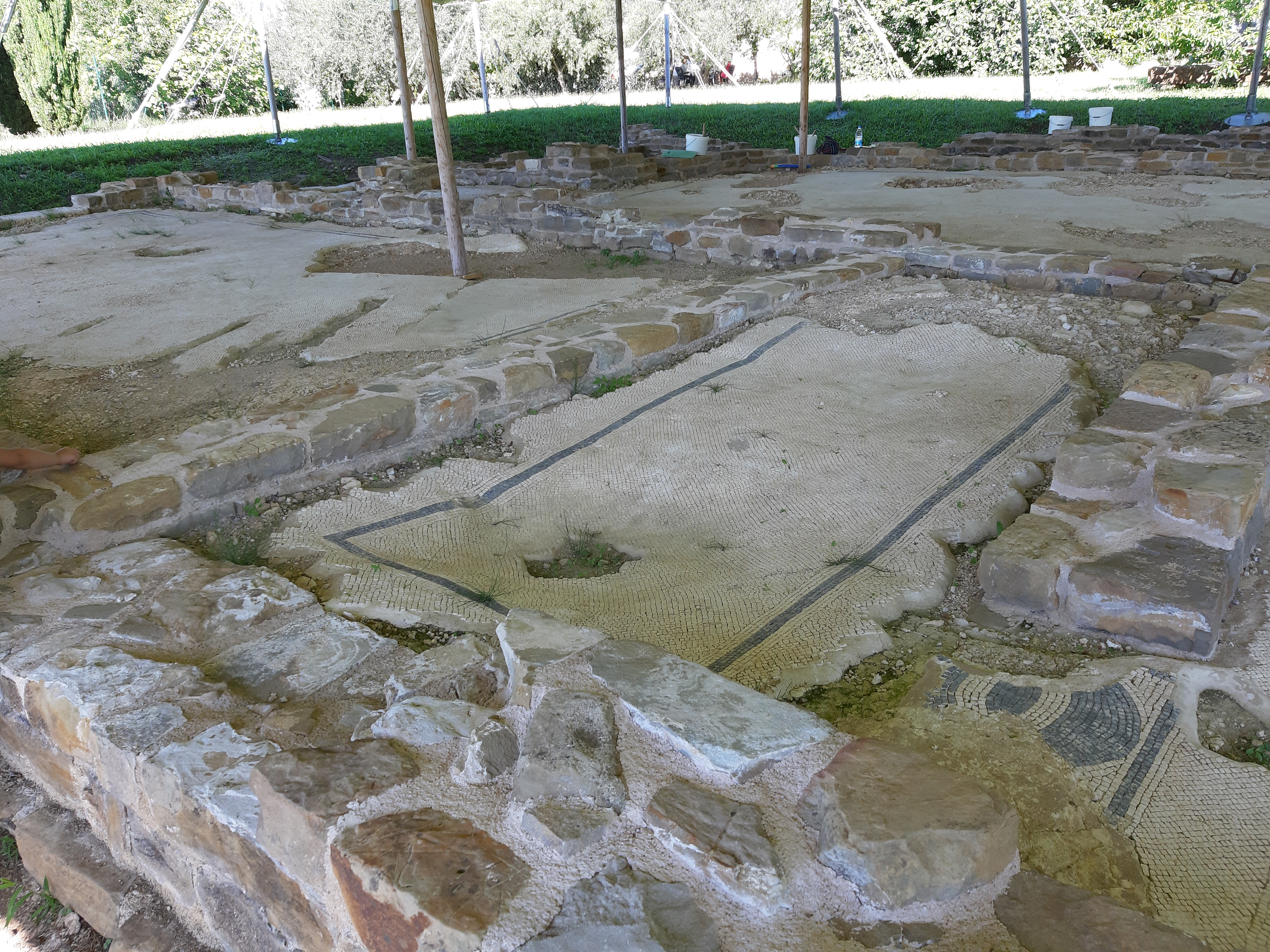
Izola, Slovenia, Haliaetum excavations

Haliaetum was a Roman port that stood in the area of Simon Bay, next to the modern village of Jagodje, on the northern Adriatic coast of the Istrian peninsula. Remains visible at extreme low tide include parts of its pier as well as various port buildings. Some excavations have been carried out in recent years, with more excavations planned in the future. The site is also open to tourists. The port was first established around 178–177 BC following fierce resistance by the Histri, the indigenous population. It gave name to St. Mary of Haliaetum Church (Slovene: cerkev sv. Marije Alietske) in Izola, the coastal town just southwest of Jagodje. It was erected in the 11th century and was later redesigned in the Baroque style.
