= Cetore =

Cetore Vinica (1957–1988)
- Location in Slovenia
- Coordinates: 45°30′7.14″N 13°38′53.84″E
- Country: Slovenia
- Traditional region: Littoral
- Statistical region: Coastal–Karst
- Municipality: Izola

Area
  - Total: 1.61 km^{2} (0.62 sq mi)
- Elevation: 211.5 m (694 ft)

Population (2002)
  - Total: 113

Cetore (pronounced [ˈtseːtɔɾɛ]; Italian: Settore) is a small village in the Municipality of Izola in the Littoral region of Slovenia.

== Name ==
The name of the settlement was changed from Cetore to Vinica in 1957. The name Vinica was an ideological (i.e., anti-Italian) change under the communist regime, referring to the native village of the Slovene poet Oton Župančič, who was born in Vinica, White Carniola. The name Cetore was restored in 1988.
