= Project 10412 patrol boat =

Export version of the Russian Svetlyak class patrol boat

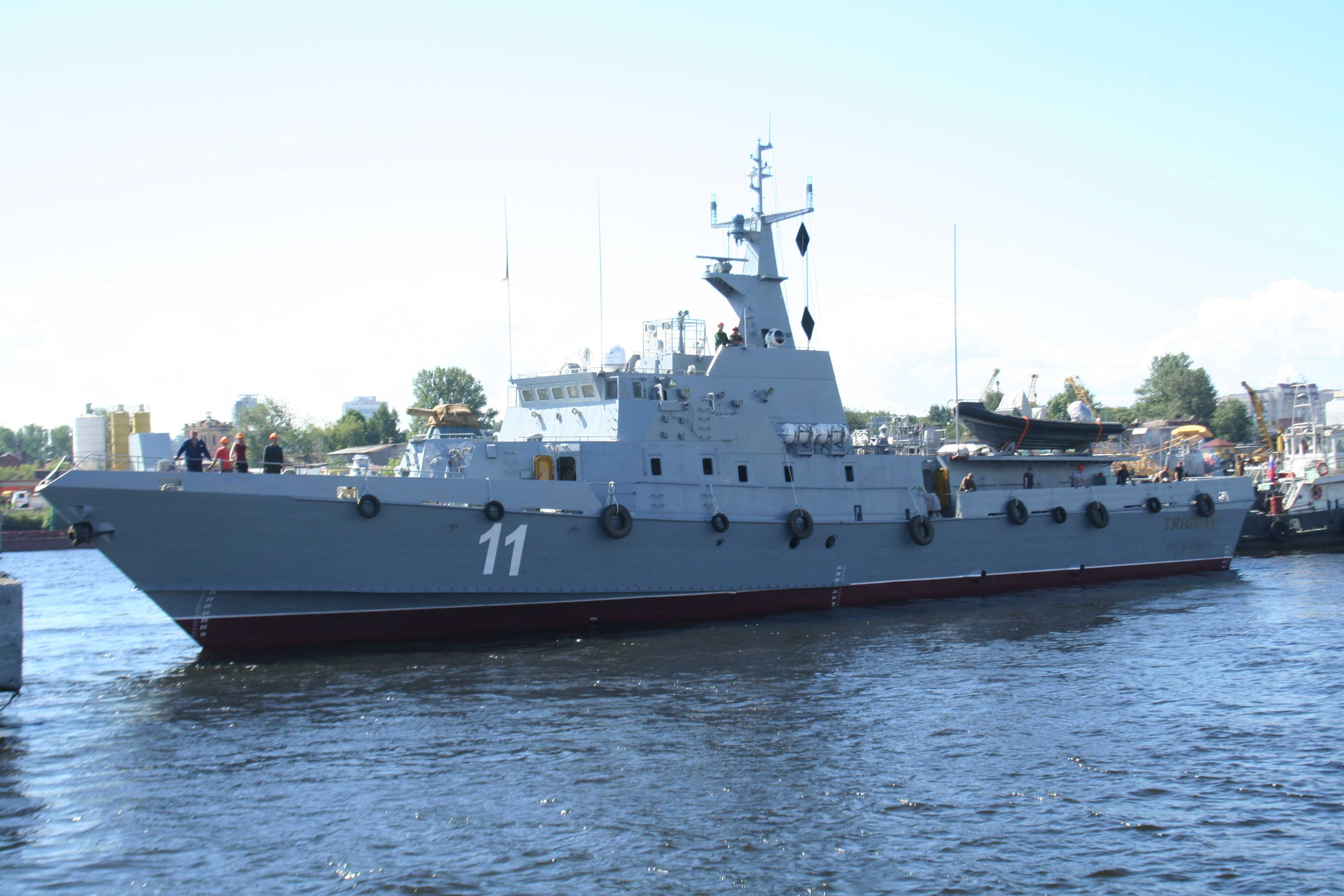
- Slovenian patrol boat Triglav, 10412 class patrol boat.

Class overview
- Name: Project 10412
- Builders: Almaz shipbuilding company
- Operators: Vietnam People's Navy; Slovenian Navy
- Cost: $35mil USD
- In commission: From 2002 (Vietnam People's Navy)
- Completed: 7
- Active: 7

General characteristics
- Class & type: Svetlyak
- Type: patrol boat
- Tonnage: 333 tons
- Displacement: 375 tons full load
- Length: 49.5 metres.
- Beam: 9.2 metres.
- Draught: 2.5 metres.
- Propulsion: 3x diesel engines with 16200 hp
- Speed: up to 30 knots (Full Speed), 13 knots ( Economical )
- Range: 2200 miles at 13 knots.
- Endurance: 10 days
- Crew: 28 ( 4 officers )
- Armament: 2x 30mm AK-630 or 1x76.2mm AK-176M ( bow section ), 16x Igla-1M MANPADS, 2x 14.5mm machine gun

Project 10412 class patrol boats are an export version of the Russian Svetlyak class patrol boat. These vessels are designed to carry out a variety of missions, from patrol missions to prevent violations of maritime state border, to protect friendly vessels and facilities from enemy surface and air attacks, to monitor exclusive economic zones, to protect natural resources areas and coastal lines of communications, etc.

== Armament and equipment ==
- 2x AK-306 gun mount (AK-176 gun can be mounted in the bow section)
- 2x 14.5mm machine gun
- 16x Igla-type MANPADS
- FR-2150W navigational radar
- Gorizont-25 integrated navigation system
- GAGK1 Pastilshchik-D gyroazimuth/horizon compass
- KM-69M1 magnetic compass
- LEMM-2-2 electromagnetic log with echosounder functions
- AP-5 dead-reckoning tracer
- RN-1 radio range-finder
- KPI-9F receiver-indicator of ground-based radio-navigation systems
- NT-200D shipborne satellite navigation equipment
- Buran-6E automated communications system

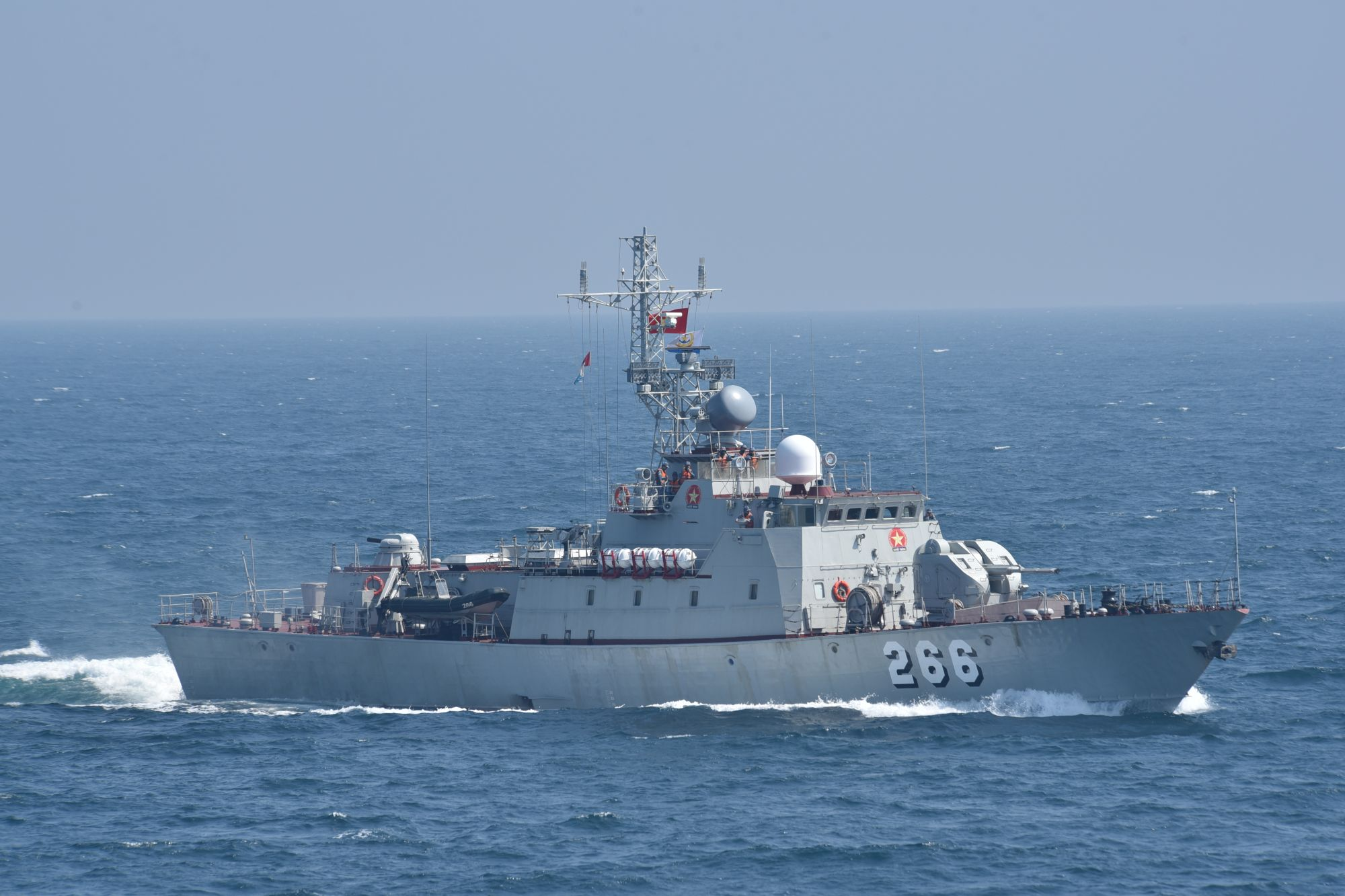
Vietnamese version with the AK-176M as the main gun.

== Versions ==
The Slovenian version, Triglav has only one AK-630, place for two inflatable boats, one decompression chamber for divers, two 14.5mm machine guns, sixteen Igla-type MANPADS, 9M120 anti-ship missile system, PK-10 anti-missile projectiles and three MTU diesel engines type 4000 with 2.880 kW each.

== Operators ==
Vietnam

- Vietnam People's Navy (6)

Slovenia

- Slovenian Navy (1) – one Russian vessel delivered as payment for debt, named Triglav.
