= Slovenian Naval Barracks =

Naval base used by Slovenian defence forces

Coordinates: 45°34′18.7″N 13°44′59.93″E

The Slovenian Naval Barracks (Slovene: Vojašnica Slovenski pomorščaki) is the sole barracks of the Slovenian Navy. It is situated in Ankaran, a settlement on the coast of the Adriatic Sea in southwestern Slovenia. The barracks were first used by the Slovenian Navy detachment in 1999. It is one of the smallest and newest barracks in Slovenia.
