= Debeli Rtič =

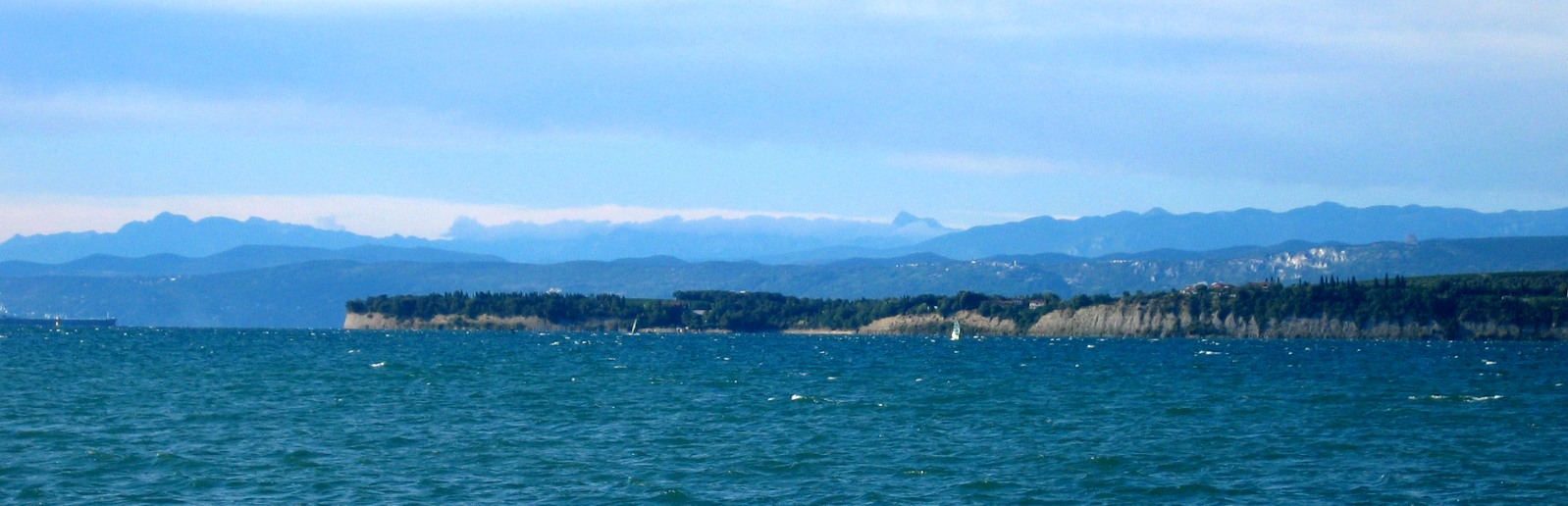

- Location in Slovenia
- Coordinates: 45°35′27.46″N 13°42′36.62″E
- Country: Slovenia
- Region: Slovenian Littoral
- Municipality: Ankaran
- Elevation: 19.2 m (63 ft)

Debeli Rtič (Slovene: Debeli rtič, Italian: Punta Grossa) is a cape in the northern Adriatic Sea on the border between Slovenia and Italy. It is located north-west of the Slovenian town of Ankaran, and west of the Italian town of Muggia. The name (both in Slovene and Italian) literally means 'Thick Little Cape'.

== Location and geology ==
Debeli Rtič is located on the west end of the Muggia peninsula, pointing toward northwest. The wide ridge of the cape elevates towards east into Jurjev hrib (George's hill), and gains altitude of 70 meters above sea. Its tip on the west end is characterised by flysch cliffs raging from 12 to 21 metres in height, and below them a narrow abrasion terrace. The gradual erosion of the cliffs erodes about 1–2 cm every year.

== Demographics and economy ==
Due to relatively shallow water around the cape and various natural obstacles in the sea it was impossible to build a port anywhere on the cape, so very few decided to live there, however the place was later used as fields to produce food, which remains up to this day.

The inner land of the cape is dominated by vineyards in ownership of Vinakoper. The Vinakoper company maintains a tradition of cabernet-growing since 1955. The park proved suitable for wine-growing as the quantity of products is significantly bigger than the counterparts in other nearby regions.

== Natural monument ==
Since 1991, part of the cape is protected as a natural monument, which is also home to the only salt meadow on the shores of the Mediterranean Sea. It is forbidden to build anything there. The natural monument area spans on 23.8 hectares (59 acres). It covers about 800 metres (2,600 ft) of coastline around the western edge, including the cliffs and the abrasion terrace. The area also includes the sea area of 200-metre (660 ft) belt along the coastline, and the small forest of about 50 trees.
