= Slovenian Navy =

Slovenian Naval Detachment
- 430th Naval Division
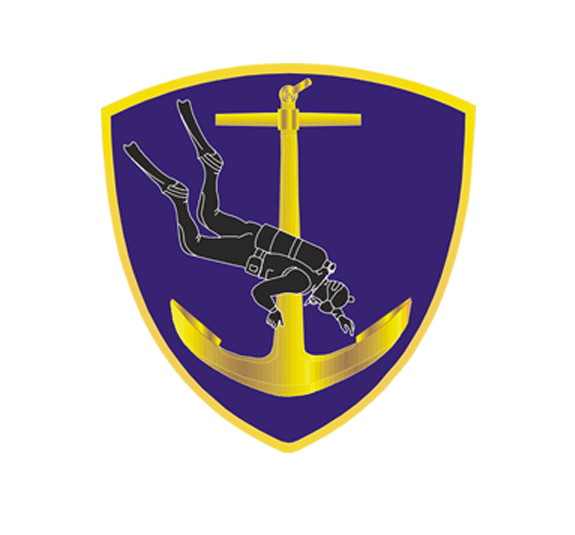
- Insignia of the 430th Naval Division
- Founded: 1993
- Country: Slovenia
- Type: Coastal defense force
- Role: Defending the sovereignty of the Slovenian sea
- Part of: Slovenian Armed Forces
- Command HQ: Slovenian Naval Barracks
- March: March of the Slovenian Navy
- Equipment: 2 vessels
- Engagements: Operation Atalanta; Operation Mare Nostrum; Operation Sophia

Insignia
- Naval ensign

- Naval jack

The Slovenian Navy, officially the 430th Naval Division (also 430th Naval Section) is not a separate service, but an integral part of the Slovenian Armed Forces. It is one of the smallest navies in Europe. As of 2024, the Slovenian Navy has 130 servicemen and two sizeable surface vessels, Ankaran and Triglav.

== History ==
The Slovenian navy was created after independence in 1991, as the Territorial Defense Forces of Slovenia had not been equipped with any maritime assets. No significant action of the Ten-Day War occurred at sea. In 1991, a small diving detachment was formed in Ankaran, equipped with sport-diving equipment because of the UN arms embargo against the former Yugoslav republics.

The 430th Naval Division was officially created in 1993. After the embargo was lifted in 1996, Slovenia purchased a single Israeli-built IAI-Ramta Super Dvora Mk2-class patrol boat, which was named Ankaran after the coastal town. In 2008, the Ministry of Defense announced that Slovenia would procure one Russian Project 10412 patrol boat, offered in payment of a multimillion-dollar debt owed to Slovenia. The vessel was subsequently named Triglav, after the mountain and national symbol. Specially equipped for Slovenian needs, it is optimized for a patrol role and lacks the anti-ship missiles of the version in service with the Russian Navy, instead mounting two rigid-hulled inflatable boats. In June and August 2015 both ships underwent overhaul in Trieste shipyard.

In 2024, the Slovenian navy introduced a new vessel, small Parker 920 Explorer patrol boat (of Polish origin) named Č-91 into service. The 10-metre boat is used, among other roles, as a diver support vessel.

In 2024 it was announced that Triglav was to undergo a major update to extend its service life and capabilities. The updated vessel was delivered in 2025.

== Equipment ==
=== Vessels ===
Name	Class	Photo	Origin	Type	Version	Number	Notes
Ankaran	Super Dvora Mk II		Israel	Patrol boat	Standard	1	
Triglav	Project 10412		Soviet Union / Russia	Patrol ship	Export version	1	

=== Drones ===
Name	Photo	Origin	Type	Number	Notes
Galeb		Slovenia	UAV	1	In 2021, the Slovenian Armed Forces acquired a drone from ElevonX that, in addition to military purposes, will also be used for search and rescue operations at sea.

== Deployments ==
The Slovenian patrol ship Triglav was sent to east Sicily in late 2013 to assist Italy with migrants from North Africa, as a part of Operation Mare Nostrum. In October 2015, Triglav was sent to southern Italy as a part of the European Union's Operation Sophia. In May 2018 Triglav suffered a major engine breakdown at the start of its deployment to the Mediterranean.
