= Malija =

Malija Malio
- Village
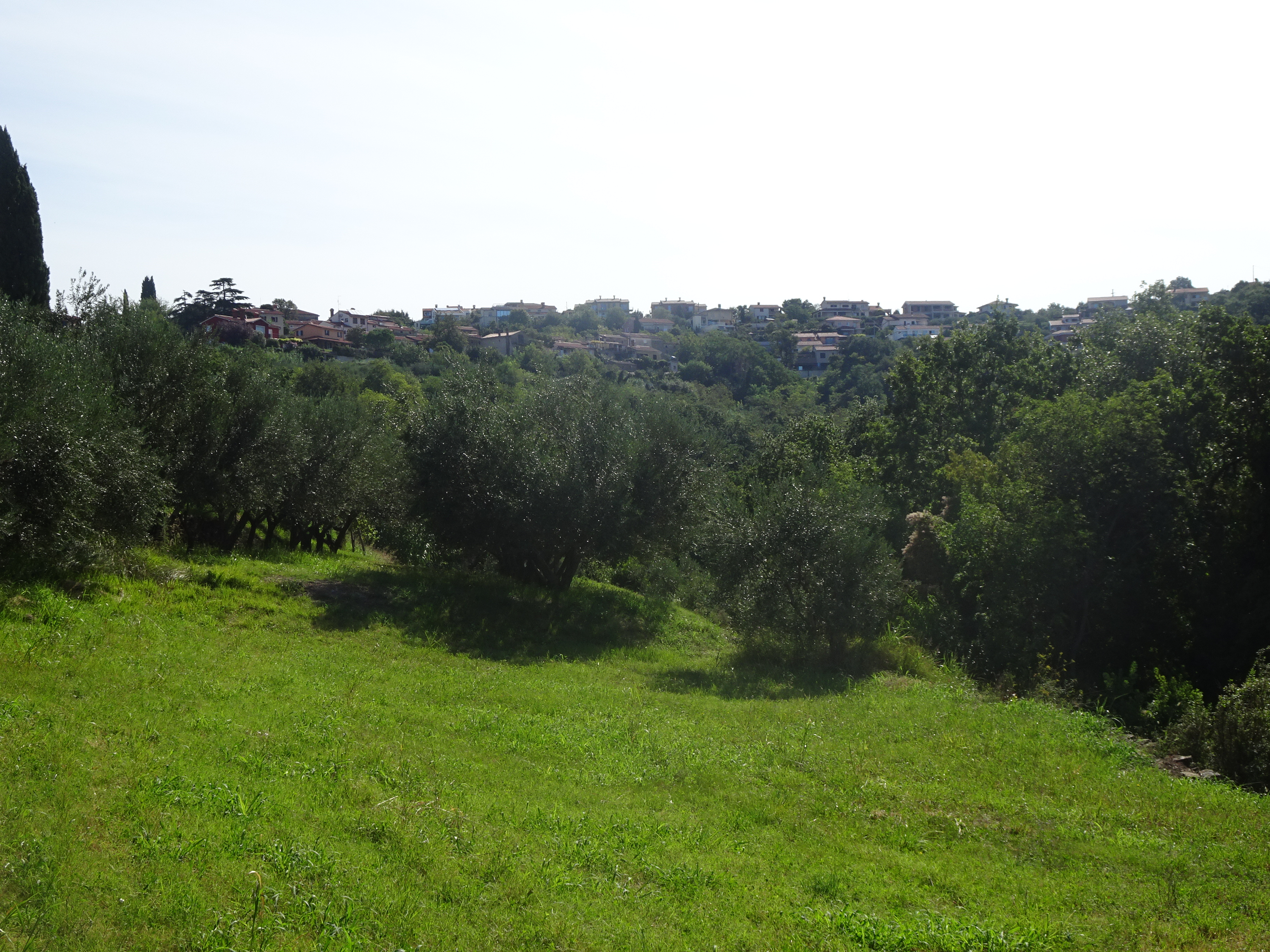

- Location in Slovenia
- Coordinates: 45°30′13.47″N 13°38′14.53″E
- Country: Slovenia
- Traditional region: Littoral
- Statistical region: Coastal–Karst
- Municipality: Izola

Area
  - Total: 1.55 km^{2} (0.60 sq mi)
- Elevation: 225.5 m (740 ft)

Population (2002)
  - Total: 363

Malija (pronounced [maˈliːja]; Italian: Malio) is a village in the Municipality of Izola in the Slovenian Istria region of Slovenia.

== Church ==
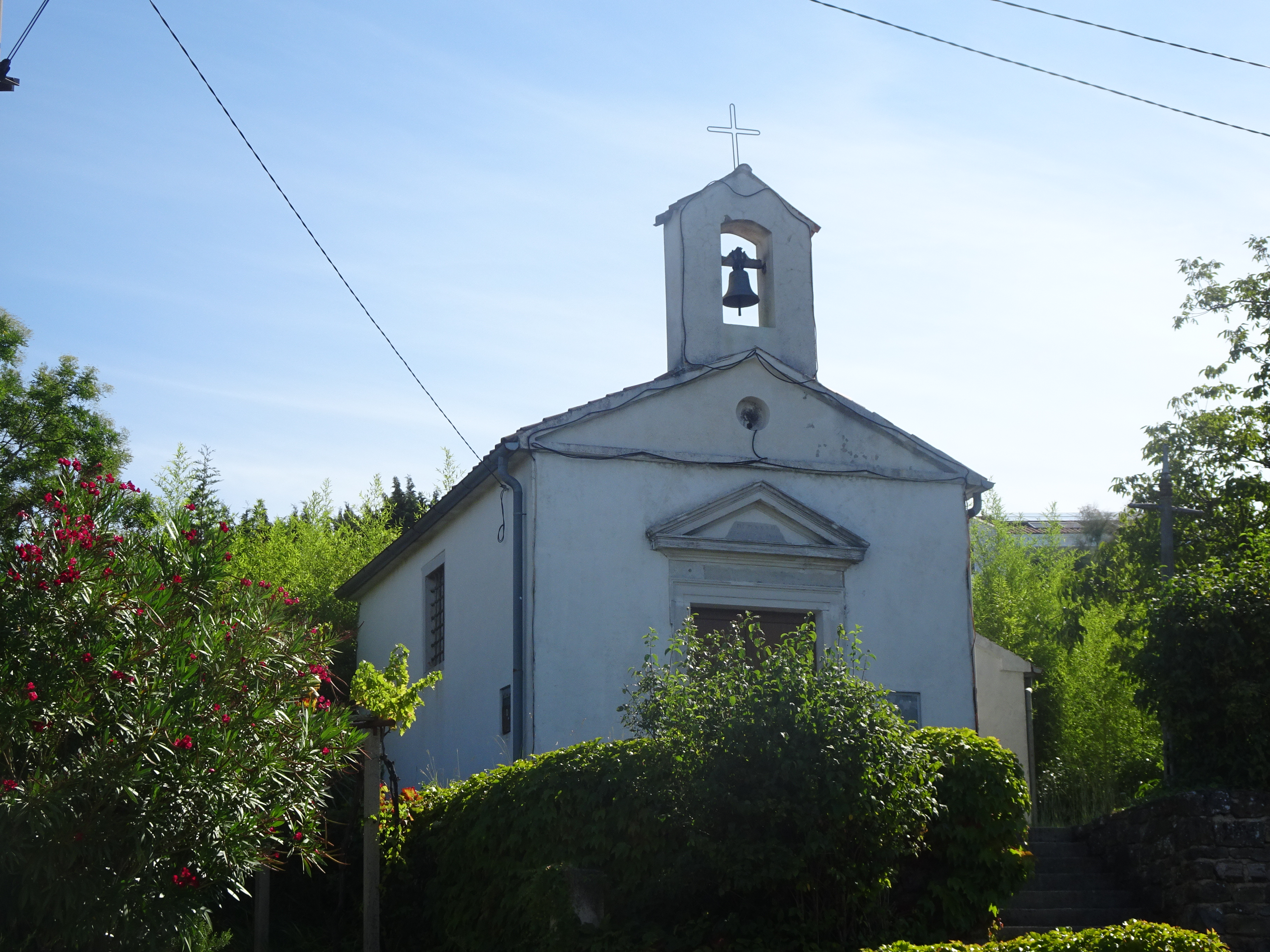
Our Lady of Mount Carmel Church

The local church is dedicated to Our Lady of Mount Carmel and was built in 1932.
