= Dobrava, Izola =

Dobrava Dobrava presso Isola (Italian)

- Location in Slovenia
- Coordinates: 45°31′52.39″N 13°37′56.47″E
- Country: Slovenia
- Traditional region: Littoral
- Statistical region: Coastal–Karst
- Municipality: Izola

Area
  - Total: 1.75 km^{2} (0.68 sq mi)
- Elevation: 89 m (292 ft)

Population (2002)
  - Total: 240

Dobrava (pronounced [dɔˈbɾaːʋa]; Italian: Dobrava presso Isola) is a settlement on the Adriatic coast in the Municipality of Izola in the Littoral region of Slovenia. The Belvedere tourist resort and camping are nearby.

== See also ==
- Dobrava (toponym)
