= Jagodje =

Jagodje Valleggia or Giagodie (Italian)
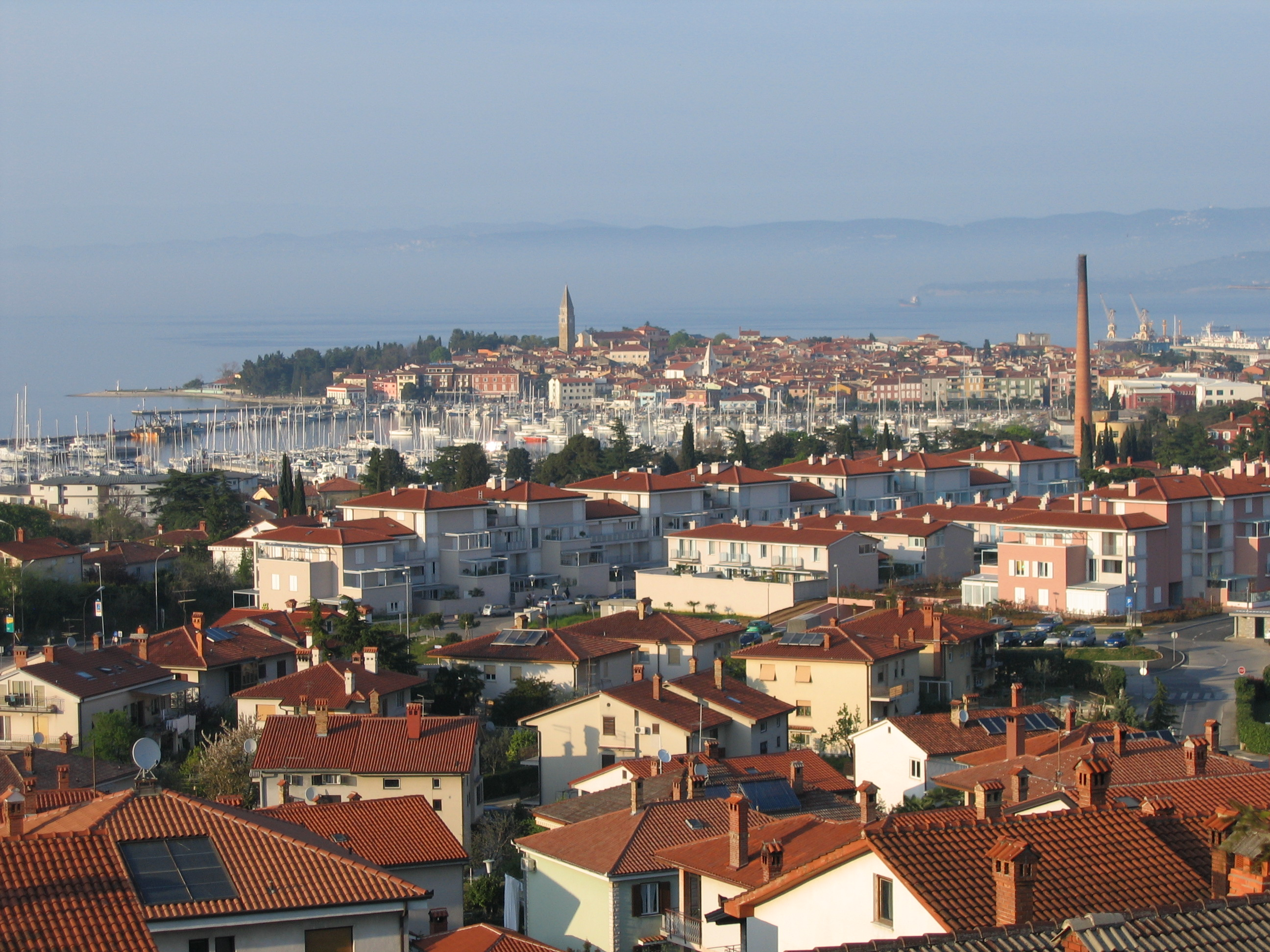
- Jagodje in the front with Izola in the background

- Location in Slovenia
- Coordinates: 45°31′41.68″N 13°38′49.73″E
- Country: Slovenia
- Traditional region: Littoral
- Statistical region: Coastal–Karst
- Municipality: Izola

Area
  - Total: 3.5 km^{2} (1.4 sq mi)
- Elevation: 28.5 m (94 ft)

Population (2002)
  - Total: 2,153

Jagodje (pronounced [ˈjaːɡɔdjɛ]; Italian: Valleggia) is a settlement on the Adriatic coast in the Municipality of Izola in the Littoral region of Slovenia. It is an urbanized settlement directly southwest of the town of Izola and was created from dispersed farmsteads in the area known as Jagodje and the hamlets of Kane (Canne), Kanola (Cànola), Kažanova (Casanova), Kostrlag (Costerlago), Lavore (Lavoré), Liminjan (Limignano), Loret (Loreto), Montekalvo (Montecalvo), and Šalet (Saletto). The local church is dedicated to the Holy Mother of Loreto. An ancient Roman port and settlement known as Haliaetum stood in the area of Simon Bay (Simonov zaliv) next to Jagodje as early as the 2nd century BC.
