= Port of Koper =

Port of Koper Luka Koper
- Interactive map of Port of Koper; Luka Koper

Location
- Country: Slovenia
- Location: Koper
- Coordinates: 45°33′N 13°44′E
- UN/LOCODE: SIKOP

Details
- Opened: 1957
- Owned by: Republic of Slovenia 51%
- Size: 280 ha (690 acres)
- No. of berths: 30
- No. of piers: 2
- Draft depth: max depth 18 m
- Employees: 2,097 (2024)
- President of the Management Board: Nevenka Kržan

Statistics
- Vessel arrivals: ▲1,798 sea ships (2024)
- Annual cargo tonnage: ▲23.0 million tons (2024)
- Annual container volume: ▲1,133,340 TEU (2024)
- Passenger traffic: ▲125,276 (2024)
- Annual revenue: ▲€330.1 million (2024)
- Net income: ▲€60.3 million (2024)
- Website www.luka-kp.si

Port of Koper (Slovene: Luka Koper, Italian: Porto di Capodistria) is a public limited company, which provides port and logistics services in the only Slovenian port, in Koper. It is situated in the Gulf of Koper in the northern part of the Adriatic Sea, mainly connecting markets of Central and Southeast Europe with the Mediterranean Sea and Far East. Unlike other European ports, which are managed by port authorities, the activities of Port of Koper comprise the management of the free zone area, the management of the port area and the role of terminal operator. It is currently the main port that serves the route between the Adriatic sea and Central Europe.

== Business ==
=== Terminals of the port ===
The Port of Koper has 12 specialized terminals:

- Container and Ro-Ro Terminal
- Car Terminal
- General cargo Terminal
- Fruit Terminal
- Timber Terminal
- Terminal for minerals
- Terminal for cereals and fodder
- Alumina Terminal
- European Energy Terminal
- Liquid Cargoes Terminal
- Livestock Terminal
- Passenger Terminal

The core business covers cargo handling and warehousing services for all types of goods, complemented by a range of additional services for cargo with the aim of providing a comprehensive logistics support for customers. The company manages the commercial zone and provides for the development and maintenance of port infrastructure.

== History ==
=== Before World War II ===
From its establishment during the era of the Roman Republic, maritime trade has played an important role in the history and development of Koper. The town received a charter from Holy Roman Emperor Conrad II in the early 11th century, while in the 13th century the Patriarchs of Aquileia granted Koper domain over its northern Istrian hinterland. In 1279, Koper was absorbed by the Venetian Republic, and developed into the pre-eminent commercial and administrative centre of Istria. Following the fall of Venice in 1797, the entire region was absorbed into the Habsburg monarchy, and, for a short while, Koper was known as the Imperial Austrian Port.

When Trieste and Rijeka were proclaimed as free ports in 1719, Koper's status, trade, and influence began to ebb. The collapse of the Venetian Republic and the transfer of local administrative and political power to Trieste that followed further hastened this decline. Koper's maritime and commercial stagnation continued, first under Habsburg rule, and then after 1919 under the Italian rule. Insecurity as to its future continued into the post-war era, during the period of the Free Territory of Trieste. Koper's status and long-term future were finally resolved in 1954 through the signing of the London Memorandum of Understanding, by way of which Zone B of the territory—including Koper and Istria—was ceded to Yugoslavia. The partition of the Trieste Free Territory led to mass emigration by ethnic Italians living in Istrian coastal towns. Neglected for more than two centuries, their commercial potential was poor and their industries obsolete, whilst maritime traffic and trade was strictly limited to local needs.

=== Postwar period ===
In investigating new possibilities for the development of Slovenian Istria, a group of enthusiasts began considering the potentials for construction of an international seaport. In 1957, they prepared an investment programme for the development of 135 metres of Koper's northern shore, while 23 May that year saw the foundation of the first handling and warehousing company Pristanišče Koper. Thus the new venture was established, employing local workers whose experience was crucial in the organisation of this new and intrepid undertaking.

By August 1957, the Peter Klepec, a floating dredger had deepened the seabed along the northern shore of town, and concreting the area around the first berth began in December. At the same time, work began on a dyke across the Stanjon inlet, and thus the operative areas of the new port began to take shape by a continuous process of dredging and accumulation. The Port of Koper was eventually permitted to join the Association of Yugoslav Ports (Slovene: Združenje jugoslovanskih luk), and in October 1958 received the state consent for its investment programme. At last due recognition was at hand.

=== The founding of Luka Koper ===
Despite developing in an era in which imports were rising, it was difficult to attract business away from the established ports in the region, such as nearby Port of Trieste (Italy) and Port of Rijeka (Croatia). But development gradually enhanced the port's competitive edge, as did its openness to prospective users, and this led to increasingly widespread commercial co-operation as well as the establishment of what were to become long-term partnerships between the port and its customers. It was mainly companies trading in foodstuffs and timber - including, amongst others, the national Silo and Warehouses Administration, Emona, Slovenijales and Centroprom - that decided to co-finance or invest in the construction of the necessary infrastructure.

Based on the resolution of the company's Workers` Council in October 1961, Pristanišče Koper changed its name to Luka Koper, and operated as a socially owned and managed enterprise. The company's objectives were clear, and by the end of 1962 its integrated operations were functioning efficiently. Development continued with the acquisition of the Dekani cold storage facility and the purchase of disinfection and fruit ripening units. By 1962, annual throughput amounted to 270,000 tonnes. Freight passing through the port was for the most part hauled by road, with a minor portion travelling by rail to Kozina, and from there transported by truck to Koper, and vice versa.

Imports were destined for the Slovenian and Serbian markets; unlike neighbouring Croatia, Serbia did not have its own access to the sea. During the early 1960s, outgoing maritime cargo, exports from the European continent, amounted to a mere 20 percent of total traffic, while the proportion of transit goods was similarly low. With nearly the same capacities and improved organisation, 1963 witnessed a throughput of 628,456 tonnes of cargo. This rapid growth was the result of increased imports of wheat, rice, fertiliser and fodder. As a consequence of its solid performance, in conjunction with its geographic and other advantages, Luka Koper gained the trust of its foreign partners, and recorded record growth.

The excellent results achieved in 1963 were also a consequence of the establishment of the first free zone, Luka Koper was able to provide a range of services for companies using the port. This new orientation required the reorganisation of the company into six units: Handling, Warehousing, Timber, Maintenance, Joint Services and Luški dom.

=== Era of railway ===
Accelerated development and operational growth revealed the inadequacy of communications with the hinterland. Various problems pertaining to the co-ordination of rail and road transport between Koper and Kozina increased the demurrage costs of vessels, wagons and trucks. Nevertheless, the freight handled by Luka Koper continued to rise, and in 1966 amounted to 788,616 tonnes.

Both the Yugoslav as well as the Slovenian authorities did not look favourably to the construction of a rail link for Koper, thus Luka Koper itself financed the initial study and project documentation. In 1964, following exhaustive negotiations, the company commissioned the scheme, and work on the new railway got underway. Despite financial difficulties and the troublesome terrain, construction work gradually proceeded, and an auspicious and lavish inaugural ceremony on 2 December 1967 marked the commencement of operations on the 31-kilometre line between Koper and Prešnica.

Soon afterwards, provisions adopted by Yugoslavia's Federal Executive Council gave fresh impetus to Luka Koper's development. Namely, foreign companies were allowed to invest in local enterprises active within the port's free zone. The construction of the Bulk Liquids Terminal was one such tangible consequence of these provisions.

Foodstuffs still accounted for the majority of cargo passing through Koper. In 1967, the total throughput of tropical fruit amounted to 113,000 tonnes, which placed it top of the list of Yugoslav ports handling such perishables. There was also an increase in transit cargo, in particular for Czechoslovakia (140,572 tonnes), Hungary (49,645 tonnes), West Germany (47,592 tonnes), Austria (15,039 tonnes), Italy (11,369 tonnes), Switzerland (1,680 tonnes), as well as Bulgaria, Romania and the USSR (with an aggregate total of 12,479 tonnes). Between 1968 and 1977 the development of the Port of Koper was exclusively dependent on indigenous resources, namely the company's own profits and raised loans. A high degree of indebtedness in conjunction with rapid development led to a number of economic and operational difficulties.

=== A leap in growth in the late 1960s ===
The most important investment in 1968 was the construction of the liquid fuels terminal, which began operations in November of that year. Indeed, petroleum derivatives saw the greatest rates of annual growth over the ensuring years. The railway was now proving itself to be an excellent investment, and even more ardent opponents to the project were finally forced to admit its worth. As a result of favourable public opinion and excellent performance, the Koper line was officially incorporated into the national rail network. At the same time the state committed itself to an interest-rate subsidy on loans raised for the development of port infrastructure, an action which greatly relieved the company's debt burden, particularly as regards the financing of the railway and port infrastructure. Accelerated development, and the large liabilities accrued through such ceaseless investment, affected cash flow and solvency. Employment conditions deteriorated, which led to a large turnover in personnel: 703 new workers were employed in 1969, while 490 also left the company. Due to the shortage of domestic labour, workers were brought in from other Yugoslav Republics. All of these conditions concerted negatively on Luka Koper's operations, and the countermeasures adopted ameliorated the situation only slightly.

=== Cargo throughput growth prior to 1970 ===
Annual maritime cargo throughput surpassed the one-million-tonnes threshold for the first time in 1968; just two years later the quantity was nearly two million tonnes. In addition to petroleum derivatives, general cargo throughput also increased, which can mainly be attributed to the revival of Slovenian trade and commerce.

The Port of Koper began operations by handling a variety of cargo, in particular fruit, timber, wheat and fodder, general cargos and oil. Initially, imports accounted for more than half of throughput, and a mere ten percent were Slovenian exports. The balance was accounted for by transit goods destined to the countries of Eastern Europe.

=== Cargo throughput growth 1970 - 1980 ===
The 1970s witnessed a slow-down in rises in cargo throughput; the growth rate averaged 2.6 percent per annum, which resulted in an increase of less than thirty percent over the decade. This deceleration was a consequence of the high degree of corporate indebtedness, labour cost rises and organisational instability.

From this period on, Luka Koper began to increasingly specialise and concentrate on certain types of cargo. The volume of timber throughput rose, whilst mineral and ore cargo shipments became ever more frequent. In addition to petroleum, other liquid cargos, such as chemicals, wine and vegetable oil were also handled. Containers and RO-RO were crucial innovations of the 1970s for which a specialised terminal came on stream in 1979.

In this era, half of cargo handled, not including petroleum derivatives, pertained to the domestic market of which imports accounted for 35 percent, and exports 15 percent of total. The other half was transit cargo pertaining to Czechoslovakia, Hungary and Austria.

=== Cargo throughput growth 1980 - 1990 ===
The 1980s were an extremely significant period in the development of Luka Koper; total throughput more than doubled, while the range of capacities were extended to those which the port has to this day. Alumina imports commenced in 1990, while dry bulk cargos increased eightfold over the decade.

In addition, the 1980s witnessed the first major shipment of cars, a trade which - over the years - was to develop into one of the most important areas of business. The second half of the decade was characterised by considerable down-turns in raw timber and fruit throughput, which was due mainly to the more widespread introduction of containerisation.

The proportion of transit freight rose throughout the 1980s, and bulk cargos for Austria particularly so. By 1990, Koper's total business, with Hungary and Czechoslovakia each still holding some 10 percent.

=== Cargo throughput growth 1990 - 2000 ===
The final few years of the 20th century were marked by dynamic growth, underpinned by an up-turn in the Slovenian economy. The late 1990s marked a particularly successful period of development for Luka Koper, while between 1990 and 2000 cargo throughput increased by over 70 percent, i.e. some 8 percent per annum.

By 2000, Luka Koper was again handling 300,000 tonnes of timber per annum. And while petroleum derivates volume reached three-fold the level they had been in the early 1990s, the company actively capped the commensurate growth that was occurring in iron ore and coal traffic. Vehicle throughput increased seventeenfold in a mere decade. The late 1990s also saw the upgrade of livestock operations. Although growth in container freight continued, it only increased by twenty percent over the decade, which for the most part was a consequence of the unstable political and economic situation experienced in many of the hinterland states during the early 1990s.

The 1990s also saw the creation of a cargo market structure that persists to this day. Some one-third of all traffic was attributable to Slovenian domestic market, while the countries of the European hinterland of Koper accounted for the remainder. By 2000, Austria was placed first with over two million tonnes of goods per annum, while Italy accounted for a significant ten percent of total.

=== Cargo throughput growth 2000–2006 ===
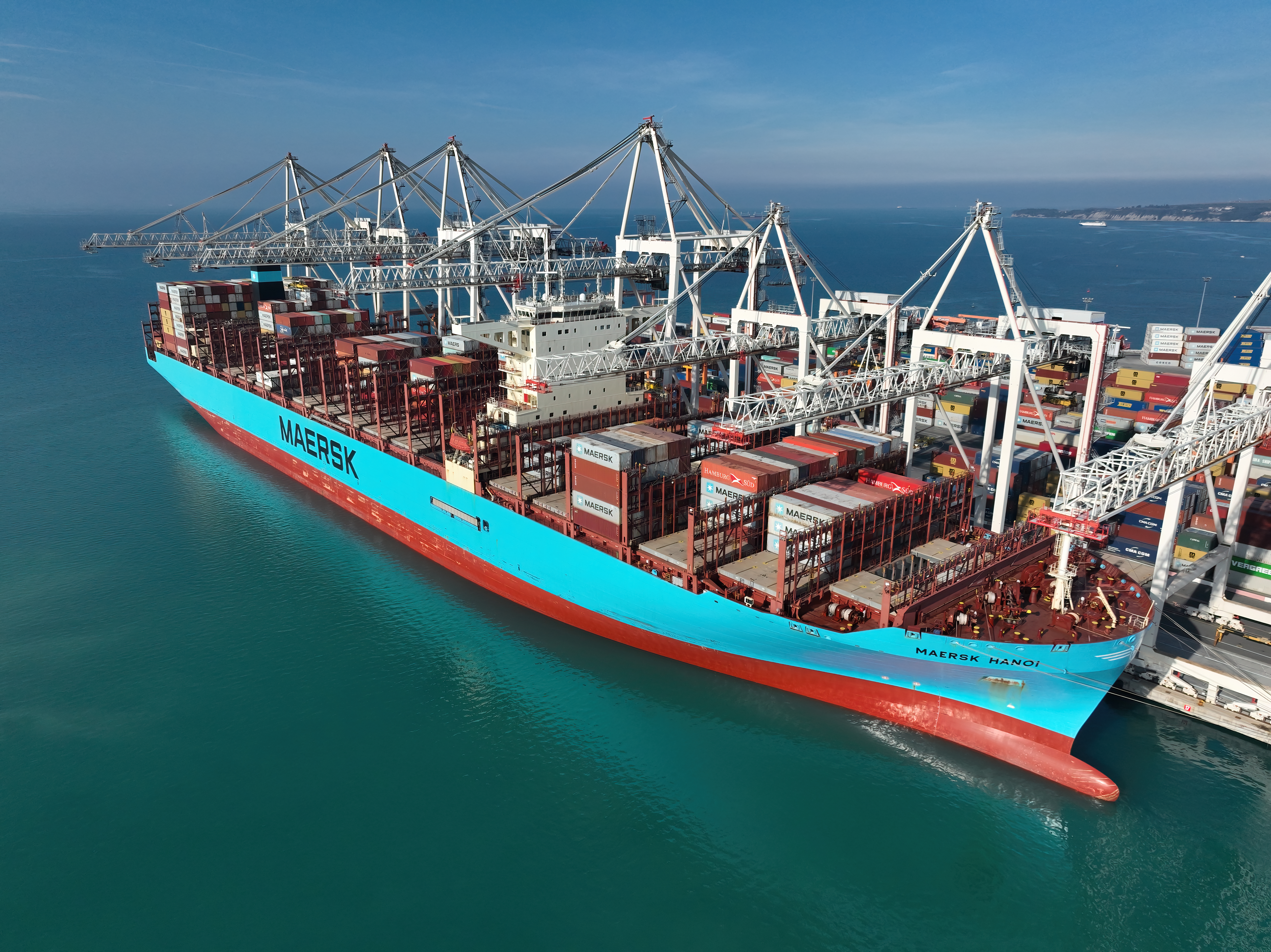
Container Ship Maersk Hanoi at the Port of Koper (2024)

From 2000 to 2006, the throughput in container traffic, vehicles, timber, liquid cargoes (excluding petroleum), and cereals, have all doubled, while general cargo has increased by over 50 percent.

The most intensive growth was recorded in trade with Hungary, which surpassed a million tonnes in 2006. Nevertheless, Austrian clients—with 3.5 million tonnes, or a quarter of total throughput—still top the transit freight list, whilst trade with Italy, which now accounts for 15 percent of business, also grew rapidly. The domestic market generated some 30 percent of turnover. The throughput has increased in average for 7 percent annually.

During 2006, cargo throughput almost reached saturation level due to the limitations posed by the single-line rail link with the national network. Over recent years the growth in container freight and vehicles has been of particular importance to the prosperity of Luka Koper, and shall remain among the company's key strategic development orientations over the coming decade.
