= Fiesa, Portorož =

Street in Portorož, Slovenia

Coordinates: 45°31′N 13°35′E

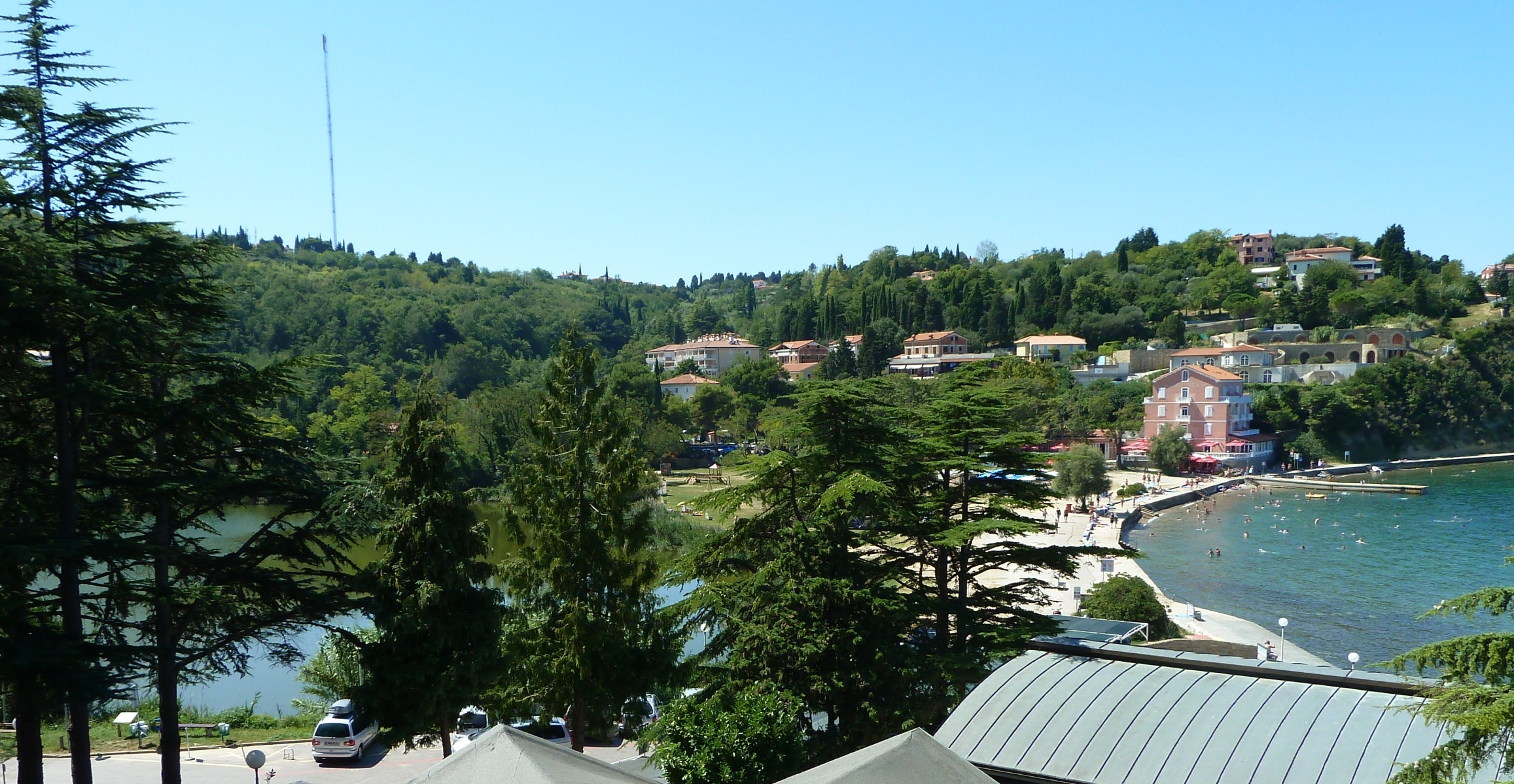
The central part of Fiesa

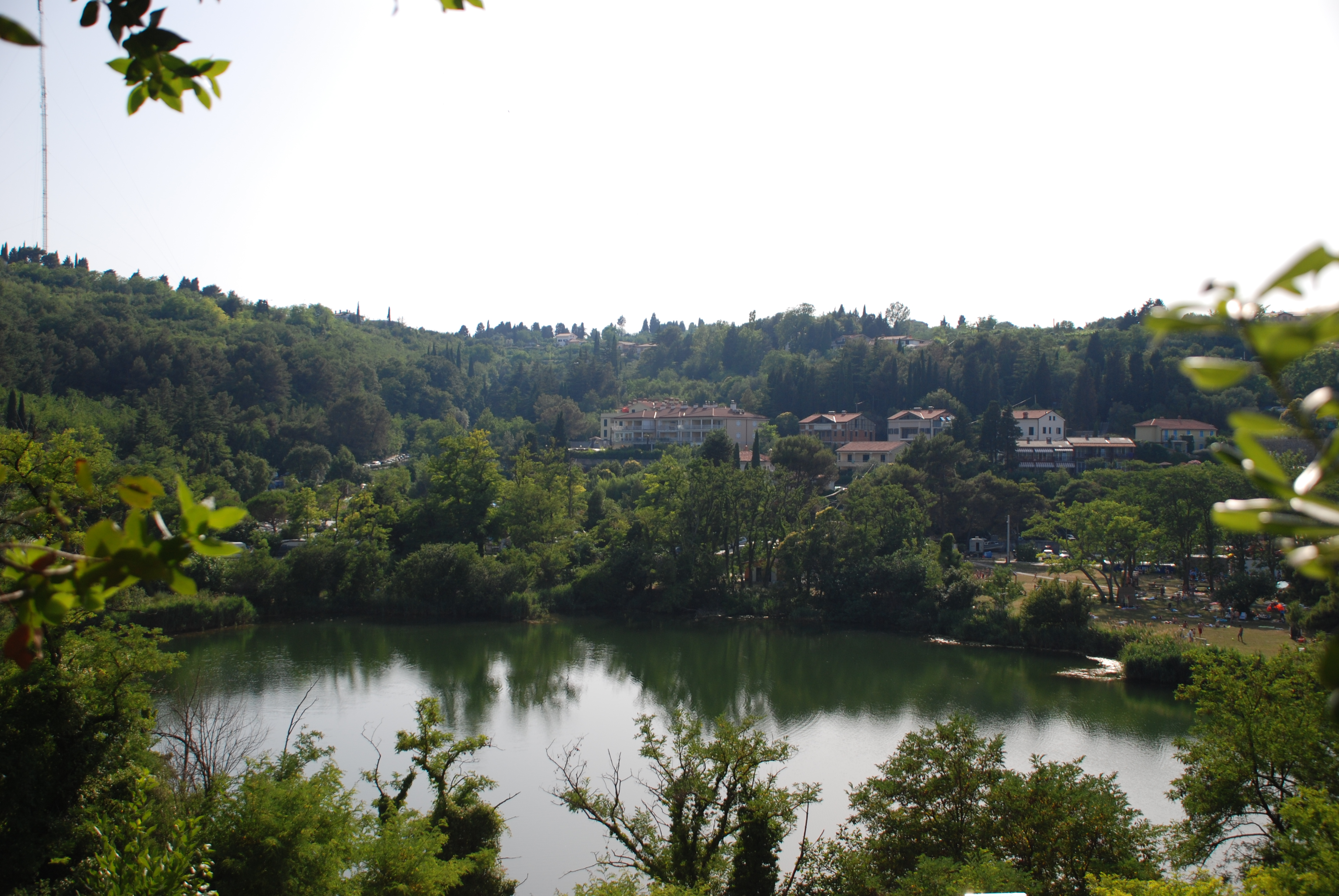
The larger coastal lake

Fiesa (sometimes Fjesa or Fjeso; Italian: Fiesso) is a street in Portorož, a settlement in the Municipality of Piran. It mainly lies in a small plain next to Fiesa Bay west of Strunjan and southeast of Piran. The beachfront west and east of the central part has high cliffs. It is connected with Piran by a road through the hills and a beach promenade along the northern beachfront. There are two hotels, a few guesthouses, and a camping site in Fiesa.

== Name ==
Fiesa was attested in written sources in 1763–87 as Fontana di Fiesso. The Slovene name is borrowed from Italian, based on the old Italian adjective fiesso 'twisted, bent' (< Latin flexus), presumably referring to the bend in the coastline at Fiesa Bay. The Slovenian feminine name Fiesa is a back-formation from the accusative Fieso, reinterpreted as a feminine noun.

== Lakes ==
There are two lakes near Fiesa Bay. They are remnants of a clay pit next to a brick factory from the first half of the 20th century. The larger one is about 20 metres (66 ft) from the coast and has a depth of up to 9 metres (30 ft). The smaller lake lies to the southwest and is around 6.5 metres (21 ft) deep. The coastal lake is the only brackish lake in Slovenia. The two lakes have become a shelter to various rare species, and so they were protected as a natural monument in 1989. The natural monument covers 2.1 hectares (5.2 acres).
