= Masami =

- Pronunciation: (Mah-sah-mee)
- Gender: Unisex

Origin
- Origin: Japanese
- Meaning: It can have many different meanings depending on the kanji used
- Region of origin: Japan

Other names
- Related names: Masako; Masumi

Masami (まさみ,マサミ, 雅美, 匡省) is a common Japanese given name and can be given to either sex.

== Written forms ==
- マサミ in (katakana)
- まさみ in (hiragana)

Forms in kanji can include:

- 惟美, meaning "Considerate beauty"
- 真己, meaning "True self"
- 真巳, meaning "Truth, Snake"
- 昌美, meaning "Prosperous beauty"
- 雅美, meaning "Gracious beauty"
- 成美, meaning "Become beautiful"

== People with the name ==
- Masami Akita (秋田 昌美; born 1956), Japanese Noise musician
- Masami Anno, Japanese director of the anime series Chūka Ichiban! which is based on the manga series of the same name
- Masami Chinen (知念 正美; 1898-1976), Okinawan martial arts master
- Daishōhō Masami (大翔鳳 昌巳; 1967–1999), Japanese sumo wrestler
- Masami Fukushima (福島 正実; 1929-1976), Japanese science fiction editor, author, critic, and translator
- Masami Hata (波多 正美; born 1942), Japanese animator and director
- Masami Hirosaka (広坂 正美; born 1970), Japanese radio-controlled car racer
- Masami Hisamoto (久本 雅美; born 1958), Japanese comedian, actress, singer and tarento
- Masami Horikoshi (堀越 正巳; born 1968), Japanese rugby union player and coach
- Masami Horiuchi (堀内 正美; born 1950), Japanese actor
- Masami Ichimura (市村 政美; born 1950), Japanese alpine skier
- Masami Ihara (井原 正巳; born 1967), Japanese former footballer and manager
- Masami Imai (今井 雅巳; born 1972), Japanese economist
- Masami Ishigaki (石垣 雅海; born 1998), Japanese professional baseball infielder
- Masami Iwaki (岩城 真美; born 1976), Japanese sports shooter
- Masami Iwasaki (岩崎 征実; born 1971), Japanese voice actor
- Masami Kageyama (影山 正美; born 1967), Japanese racing driver
- Masami Kawamura (川村 雅未; born 1999), Japanese rugby union player
- Masami Kikuchi (菊池 正美; born 1960), Japanese voice actor and narrator
- Masami Kobayashi (小林 仁; 1890–1977), Japanese admiral in the Imperial Japanese Navy during World War II
- Masami Kubota (久保田 正躬; born 1931), Japanese former gymnast who competed in the 1956 Summer Olympics
- Masami Kurumada (車田 正美; born 1953), Japanese manga artist and writer
- Masami Kuwashima (桑島 正美; born 1950), Japanese former racecar driver
- Masami Masuda (born 1944), known as Cusi Masuda, Japanese-American artist, sculptor and painter
- Masami Mitsuoka (光岡 昌美; born 1986), Japanese pop singer
- Masami Miyamoto (宮本 まさみ; born 1934), Japanese diver
- Masami Nagasawa (長澤 まさみ; born 1987), Japanese TV drama and movie actress
- Masami Nakabo (中坊 雅美; born 1941), Japanese former swimmer
- Masami Nishimura (西村 正美; born 1963), Japanese former politician
- Masami Ōbari (大張 正己; born 1966), Japanese anime director, animation director and mecha and character designer
- Masami Odate (大館 昌美; born 1990), Japanese professional wrestler
- Masami Ohinata, Japanese academic and president of Keisen University in Tokyo
- Masami Ōishi (大石 正巳; 1855–1935), Japanese daimyō during late-Edo period
- Masami Okui (奥井 雅美; born 1968), Japanese singer and songwriter
- Masami Inaba (稲葉 正巳; 1815–1879), Japanese singer and songwriter
- Masami Sato (佐藤 正美; born 1981), Japanese former football player
- Masami Shimojō (下條 正巳; 1915–2004), Japanese film and stage actor
- Masami Shinoda (篠田 昌已; 1958–1992), Japanese alto-saxophonist and composer
- Masami Shiratama (白玉 雅己; born 1974), Japanese musical composer and former bass guitarist for the band Porno Graffitti
- Masami Suzuki (鈴木 真仁; born 1972), Japanese actress, voice actress and singer
- Masami Tachikawa (立川 真紗美; born 1980), Japanese basketball player
- Masami Taki (滝 雅美; born 1972), Japanese football manager
- Masami Tanabu (田名部 匡省; 1934–2025), Japanese politician and former ice hockey player and coach
- Masami Tanaka (田中 雅美; born 1979), Japanese former breaststroke swimmer
- Masami Taniguchi (谷口 雅美; born 1976), Japanese volleyball player
- Masami Teraoka (寺岡 政美; born 1936), Japanese-American watercolor artist who mimics the style of traditional Japanese wood-block prints
- Masami Tsuchiya (Aum Shinrikyo) (土谷 正実; 1965–2018), Japanese convicted terrorist and senior member of Aum Shinrikyo
- Masami Tsuchiya (singer) (土屋 昌巳; born 1952), Japanese singer-songwriter, guitarist, and record producer
- Masami Tsuda (津田 雅美; born 1970), Japanese manga artist
- Masami Tsuruoka (鶴岡 政己; 1929–2014), Japanese-Canadian karate instructor and practitioner
- Masami Uno (宇野 正美; born 1942), Japanese writer
- Masami Yamazaki (山崎 雅美; born 1978), Japanese katsudō-benshi, voice actor, actress, choreographer and a tarento
- Masami Yokoyama (横山 雅美; born 1981), Japanese volleyball player
- Masami Yoshida (javelin thrower) (吉田 雅美; 1958–2000), Japanese javelin thrower
- Masami Yoshida (sprinter) (吉田 正美; born 1946), Japanese sprinter
- Masami Yoshida (吉田 雅美; born 1962) ,known as Devil Masami Japanese professional wrestler
- Masami Yūki (ゆうきまさみ; born 1957), Japanese manga artist

== Fictional characters ==
- Masami Eiri (英利 政美), villain from the anime Serial Experiments Lain
- Masami Kaida, a character in the air combat video game The Sky Crawlers: Innocent Aces
- Masami Oyamada (小山田雅美), from the manga and anime Someday's Dreamers
- Masami Saotome (早乙女正美), from the live action film: Boogiepop and Others
- Masami Yamada (山田 正臣), teacher from the anime Onegai Teacher
- Masami Aomame, the full name of the lead female protagonist in Haruki Murakami's novel, 1Q84
- Masami Yoshida the wealthy daughter of the Rainbow Factory Owner from The Amazing World of Gumball
- Masami Kousa, a yakuza boss in the manga/anime series Black Lagoon
- Masami Fujii, a character in the manga/anime series Ro-Kyu-Bu!
- Masami Iwasawa (岩沢雅美), the original lead vocalist and rhythm guitarist of Girls Dead Monster from the anime Angel Beats!

== See also ==
- Japanese name
- Japanese language
