= Forma viva =

In Slovenia, a forma viva (from Latin 'living form') is an open-air sculpture gallery or museum set in a park, displaying contemporary sculpture from around the world.

It also refers to Forma Viva, an annual symposium on the subject of sculpture. The symposia take place annually at different locations in Slovenia. The main venues are in Portorož on the Seča peninsula (for stone), and Kostanjevica na Krki (for wood). Other locations are Ravne na Koroškem (for steel) and Maribor (for concrete). The symposia are the world's oldest active of their kind.

== History ==
The project was started in 1961 by Slovenians Janez Lenassi and Jakob Savinšek. They first met in 1959 at the Bildhauersymposion St. Margarethen in the quarry at Sankt Margarethen im Burgenland. In proposing the name forma viva, they meant exploring living sculpture in ever new directions; the meaning became extended to mean the symposia themselves, and later to describe any outdoor collection of sculpture.

Soon after came parks at Ravne na Koroškem (1964) and Maribor (1967).

From their symposia, the curators of the Littoral Galleries at Piran, who are in charge of the park, collected over 300 pieces of sculpture for the park at Portorož alone. These are now distributed around the several parks on the Slovenian coast, as originally planned over fifty years ago, although there are no plans for expansion.

The symposia use some of their proceeds as grants to their exhibitors, in exchange for a donation of one or more works to the parks, such as Jose Ramon Villa Soberon's celebrated work Regatta in the marina of the port of Koper, where the mariners probably wonder what it is, while the few art-lovers passing by cannot even enjoy the view, it being rather in a blind spot.

In its first year (1961) there were 22 international participants. The symposia in Seča have continued without exception every two years, with sculptors from 30 countries so far participating, creating over 120 works, and up to 30,000 visitors attending.

== Locations ==
International sculptors invited to the Portorož symposium work in white Italian stone, whereas in Kostanjevica they generally work in wood, the typical building material for the region. In Ravne na Koroškem they work in steel, and in Maribor in concrete.

=== Portorož — Stone ===
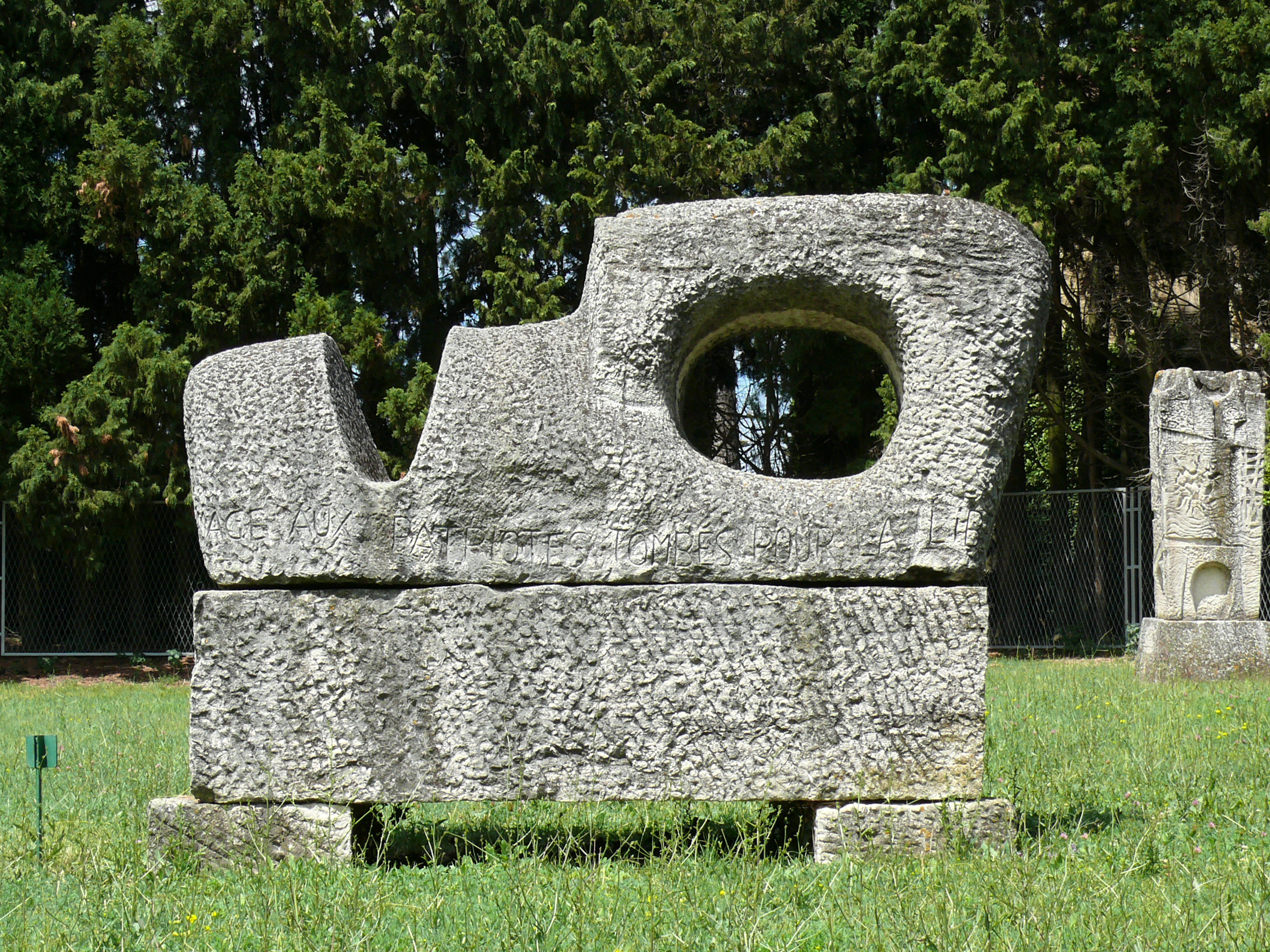
Hommage aux patriotes tombés pour la liberté (English: "Homage to patriots who died in the cause of liberty") from the 1963 Forma Viva by Achiam

The park at Portorož, in the Slovenian Littoral region, sits atop the small peninsula of Seča. It has beautiful views over the Adriatic Sea. It was the first to be founded, in 1961, by the two Slovenian sculptors, although the park at Kostanjevica na Krki was inaugurated the same year. At first, the founders held annual symposia in both Portoroz and Kostanjevica but, for economic reasons, this had to be curtailed after a few years, so that Portorož and Kostanjevica hold the symposia alternately, each every two years.

The majority of the stone sculptures are located in the park on the Seča peninsula (45°30′7″N 13°35′33″E) on the Adriatic Sea and a minority in parks at Koper, Izola and Piran. They are sculpted from the hard and resistant bright Istrian stone, a local limestone. Istrian stone is favoured for its hardwearing quality, especially against water erosion (among other things it is used for the historic fountains in Venice).

=== Kostanjevica na Krki — Wood ===
Parallel to the symposia in Seča, others in Kostanjevica na Krki, in the south-east of Slovenia, were organized from 1961. These were held annually until 1966, and then every other year. Between 1988 and 1998 there was no co-ordination between the symposia in Seča and those in Kostanjevica.

== Sources ==
- Breulj, Lusi (2012). "Forma viva" e il dibattito sulla scultura contemporanea in Slovenia (in Italian). Trieste: Università degli studi di Trieste.. Master's degree thesis.
- Božeglav-Japelj, Majda (2002). Zbornik (ed.). "Kultura na narodnostno mešanem ozemlju Slovenske Istre – Varovanje naravne in kulturne dediščine na področju konservatorstva in muzeologije. – Mednarodni kiparski simpozij Forma viva". Razprave filozofske fakultet. Lubjljana: Znanstveni Inštitut Filozofske Fakultete: 323–365.
- Exhibition catalogues: 1962, 1964, 1973 – 79, 1980, 1981, 1987 – 1989.
