= Portorož =

Portorož Portorose (Italian)
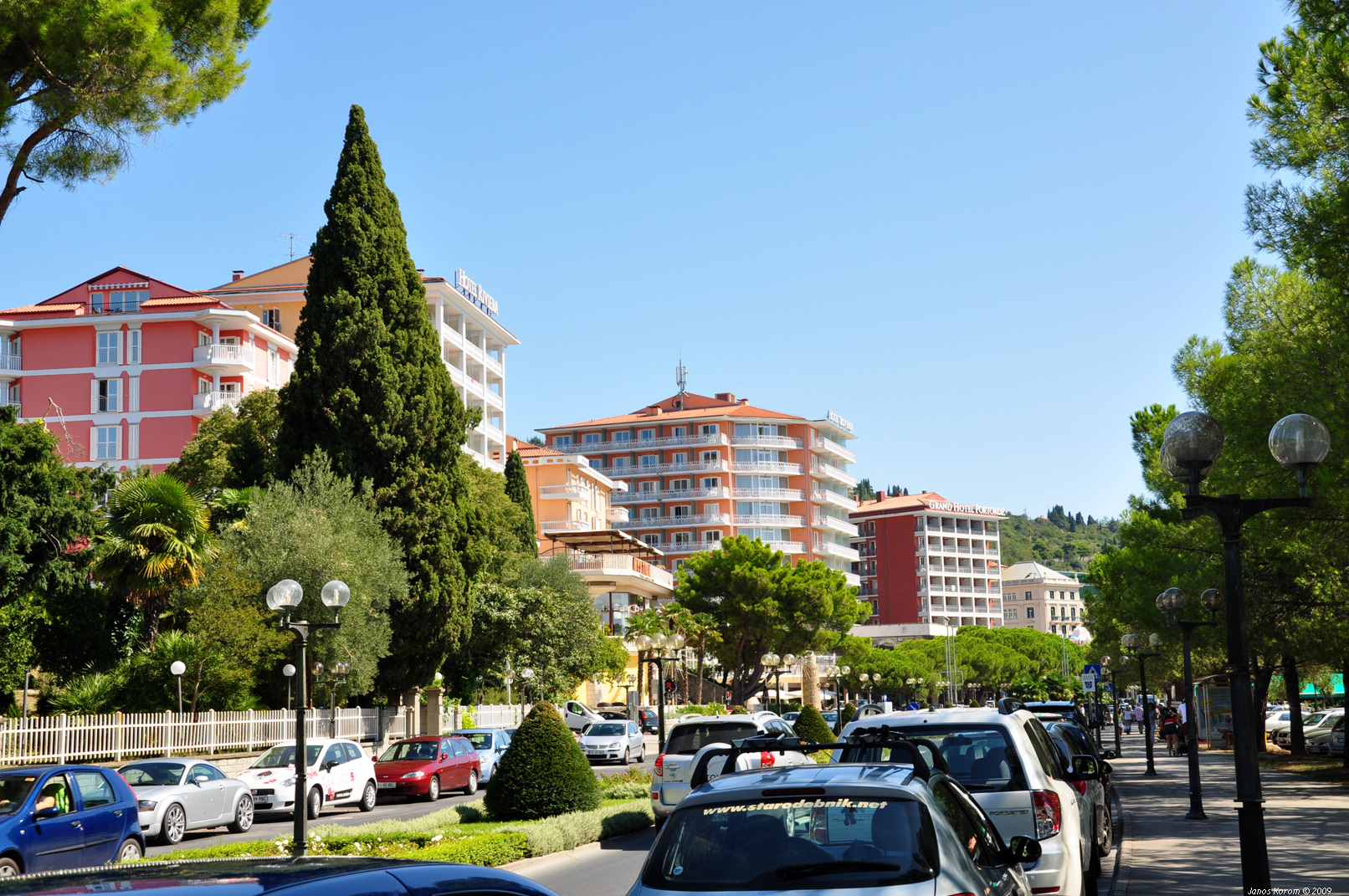
- Portorož in late August 2009
- Interactive map of Portorož
- Location in Slovenia
- Coordinates: 45°30′59.88″N 13°34′47.89″E
- Country: Slovenia
- Traditional region: Slovenian Littoral
- Statistical region: Coastal–Karst
- Municipality: Piran

Area
  - Total: 2.97 km^{2} (1.15 sq mi)
- Elevation: 31.2 m (102 ft)

Population (2002)
  - Total: 2,849

Portorož (pronounced [pɔɾtɔˈɾóːʃ]; Italian: Portorose) is a Slovenian Adriatic seaside resort and spa settlement located in the Municipality of Piran in southwestern Slovenia. Its modern development began in the late 19th century with the vogue for the first health resorts. In the early 20th century Portorož became one of the grandest seaside resorts in the Adriatic, along with Opatija, Lido and Grado, then as part of the Austrian Littoral. It is now one of Slovenia's major tourist areas. Located in the centre is the Palace Hotel, once one of the most important resorts for the Austro-Hungarian monarchy, and currently one of the finest hotels between Venice and Dubrovnik.

The settlement and its surrounding areas are served by Portorož International Airport which is located in the nearby village of Sečovlje.

== Name ==
The Slovene name Portorož is borrowed from Italian Portorose, literally 'port of roses', which was recorded in the 12th century as Porto di rose. The name is derived from Santa Maria delle Rose 'St. Mary of the Roses', the patron saint of a former church in the settlement.

== History ==
The history of the settlement is directly connected to that of the neighbouring town of Piran, with Illyrian settlers already living there in the prehistoric era. They were followed by Celtic tribes, which were later conquered and annexed by the Roman Empire in 178 B.C. Archaeological finds suggest that in this period many farms and villas, also named villae rusticae, were built in the area. A large development of the area followed only after the demise of the empire, with enlargement of the number of settlers seeking shelter from attacks by the Barbarians.

In the 7th century, the area was a part of the Byzantine Empire. Due to increasing dissatisfaction with the feudal rule, as well as the rising power of the Venetian Republic, the settlement of Pirano signed a trade treaty with Venice, which included a lesser degree of autonomy.

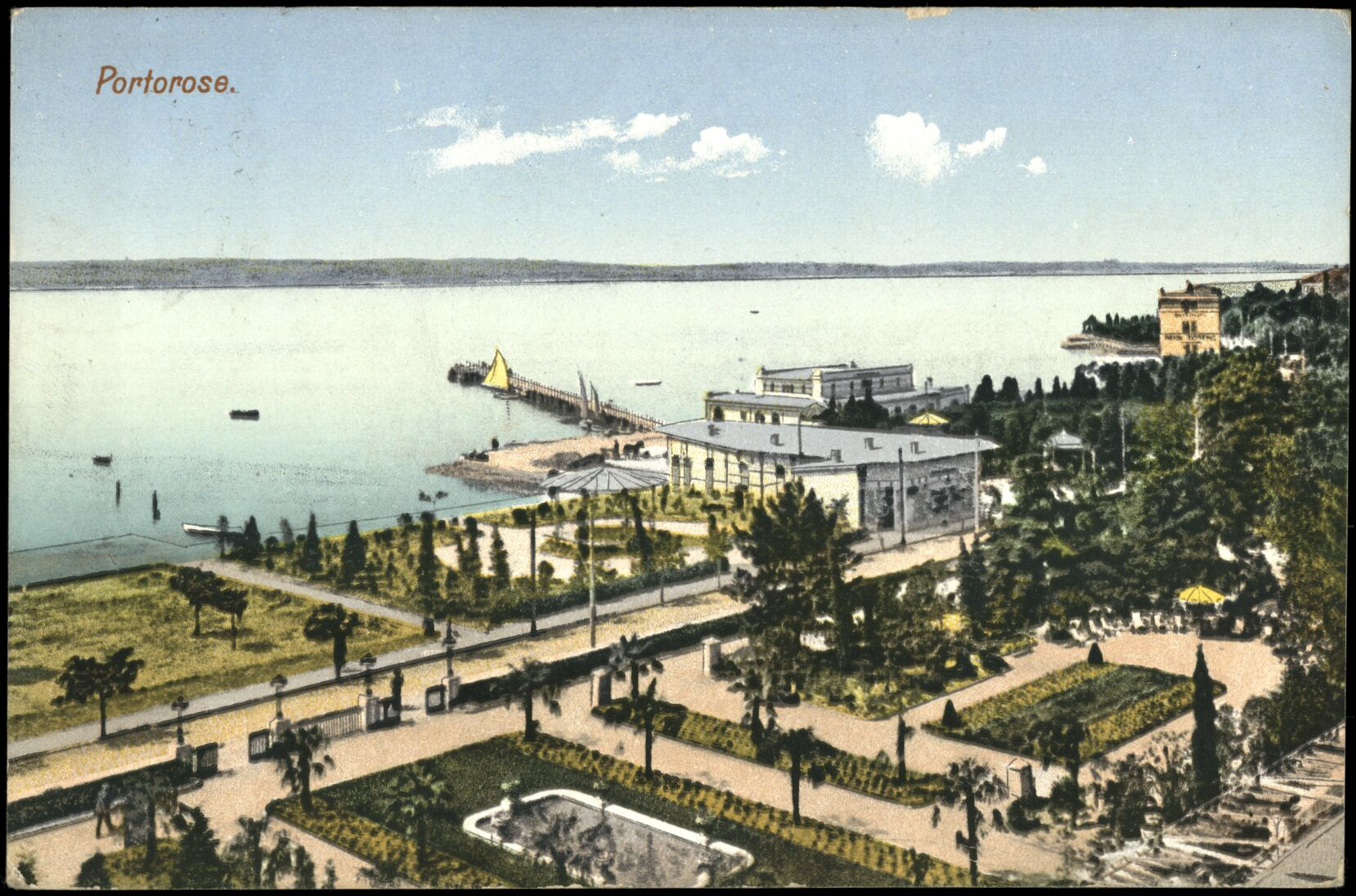
Portorose in 1912

One of the first religious orders who came to this area was the Benedictines. In the 12th century, the broader region already had four monasteries and even more churches. Among those, one of the oldest was the church of Our Lady of the Rosary, which stood by the bay in the beginnings of the 13th century. Its name was Sancta Maria Roxe or S. Maria delle Rose, and in 1251 the bay was named by it Portus sanctae Mariae de Rosa.

One of the most important roles in the history of the settlement was the monastery of Saint Laurence, where the Benedictines healed rheumatic illnesses, ascites and other diseases with concentrated saltwater and saline mud. In 1210, the area was overtaken by the Patriarchy of Aquileia.

In the 13th century, Pirano entered a brief war from December 1282 to January 1283, in which it was defeated by the Venetian Republic.

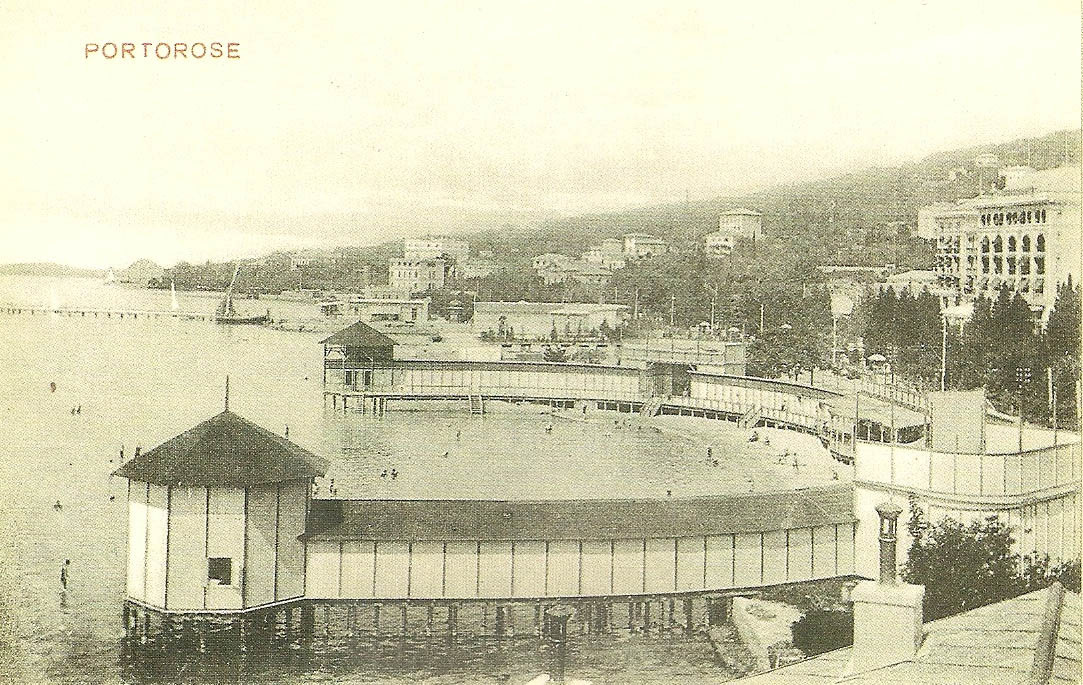
Portorose's bath in 1915

During the second Venetian rule, it was, contrary to other towns on the Istrian peninsula, loyal to Venetian rule, and as such gained special privileges within the republic, which in turn caused the local economy to boom. In 1797, Venetian rule came to a close as the Austrian Empire took over the area for a brief period until 1806. From 1806 to 1813, the entire Istrian Peninsula became part of the Illyrian Provinces.

A period of economic growth followed during the second Austrian rule, with enlargement of trade and locally important salt pans in nearby Lucija and Sečovlje. In the aftermath of the Great War, the Treaty of Rapallo determined the Istrian peninsula to be from that point on a part of the Kingdom of Italy.

Under the royal and then fascist rule, the area found itself amidst economic decline and civil conflicts between the populace and the state. In World War II, the area had not seen much action, although the important industrial hub of Trieste suffered multiple bombings. In the aftermath of the war, the settlement found itself in the United Nations-administered Free Territory of Trieste. After the dissolution of the Trieste state it became a part of Yugoslavia.

== Economy ==
The economy of Portorož is mainly based on tourism and the gambling industry. The facilities include a marina, numerous sporting facilities and several casinos, along with many hotels and apartment complexes.

=== Tourism development ===
In the second half of the 19th century, the leaders of the Pirano municipality and local doctors decided to stimulate tourism in the region, by offering health treatment by concentrated salt water and salina mud. From 1879 onward, Giovanni Lugnano was first to offer such salt treatments to various visitors.

In 1885, after several years of successful start of new spa salt treatments, constructions of new treatment complexes and private villas began, and, in 1890, the predecessor of the famous Hotel Palace was built.

In 1908, Orazio Pupini, a prominent Austrian doctor with a notable treatment history opened a sanatorium. He was also the main doctor of the Austrian Railways, and a member of the Austrian Doctors' Association. In 1902, the Parenzana railway system was introduced which increased the popularity of the region, but was later dissolved because of decreased spa interests.

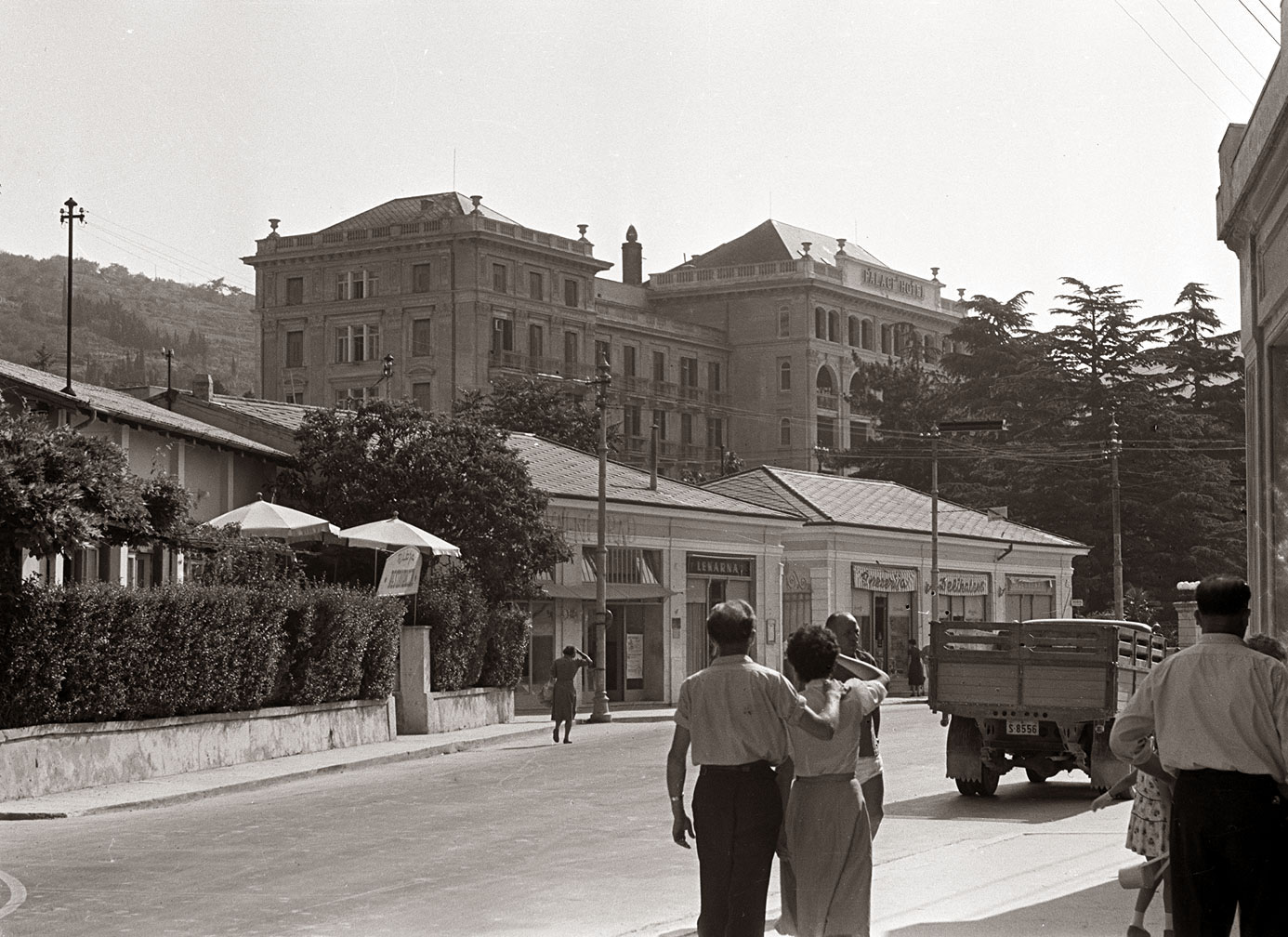
Palace Hotel in 1957

In 1909, the era of construction of most private villas ended with opening of a much bigger building for accommodation standards at the time; the Palace Cur Hotel, later known as the Palace Hotel. At the initial opening ceremony, in 1910, the Palace Hotel was named "the most beautiful hotel on the Adriatic coast". The hotel was equipped with the most modern therapeutic accessories, and a casino was built for important wealthy guests.

The thriving tourist community was halted by World War I, and a few years after the war (in which they came under Italian rule) in 1928 they included a new electric therapy among their treatment programmes. In the interwar period the settlement was slowly regaining its former glory when World War II severely crippled it again. The crisis lasted until 1968 when renovations and new constructions under the new entity of Yugoslavia began to take place along the whole region. In this time they began to build the settlement's infrastructure with the casino doing the bulk of the investments in reconstructing the sports airfield in nearby Sečovlje and building the multi-purpose auditorium in 1972.

In 1976, two hotel complexes were constructed in Bernardin; in the following year another was added in the same area. In the same year they began transforming the Lucija saltworks into a marina for smaller vessels. Since the separation of Slovenia from Yugoslavia, Portorož has become one of the most important tourist sites in the country.

=== Gambling ===
The first casino to be opened was in Villa San Lorenzo, on 27 July 1913, and was run by the Casino des Etrangers society. It only lasted a few months before being shut down.

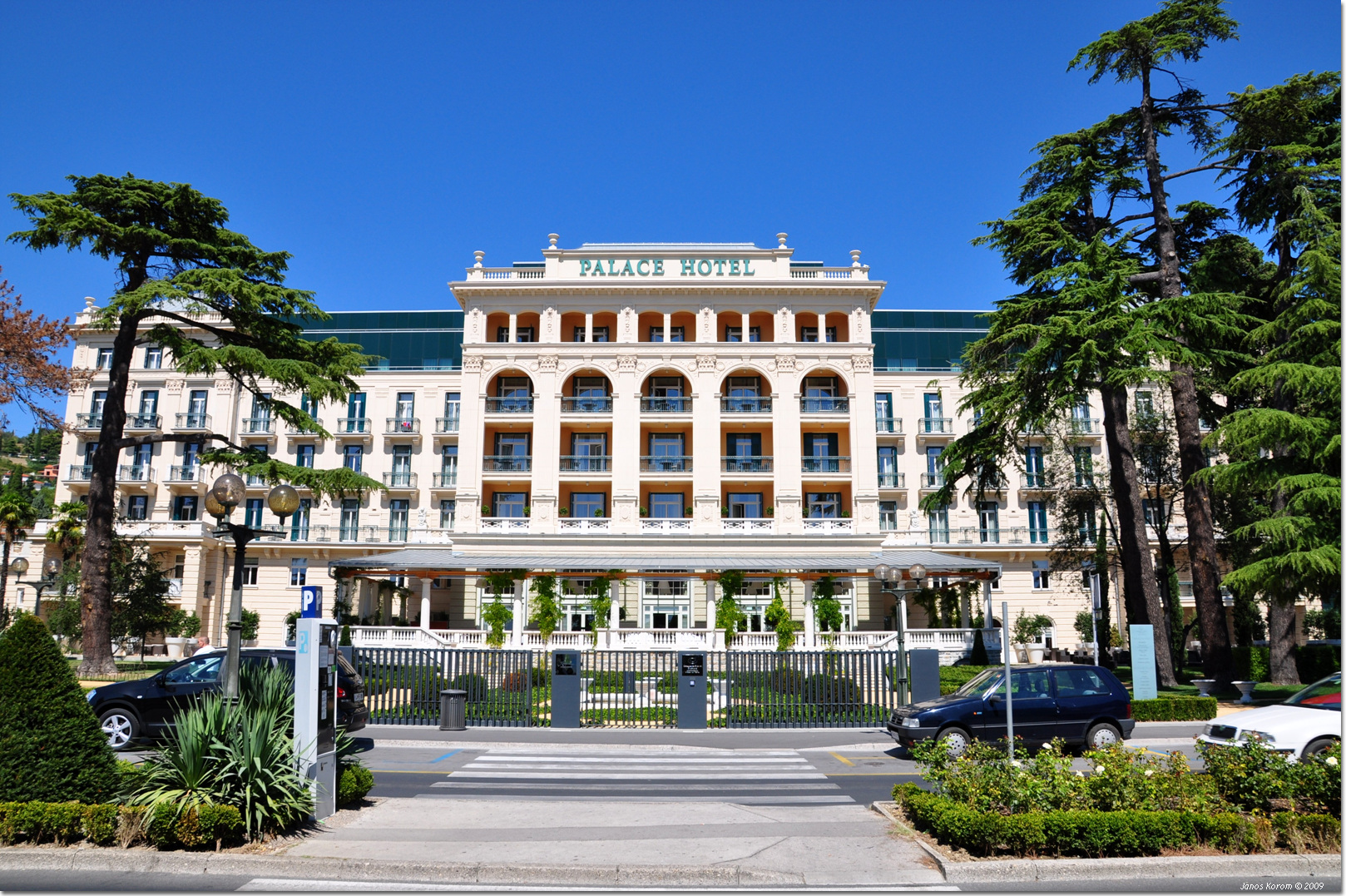
Palace Hotel, present day

The industry faded away in the northern Adriatic region, until 1963, when Zavod za pospeševanje turizma, whose president was Anton Nino Spinelli, proposed a reopening of the casino. The next year the first casino in the Socialist Republic of Slovenia, and the second within Yugoslavia other than the one in Opatija, Croatia.

In 1972, the company moved into the newly built and much larger Remisens Premium Hotel Metropol, where they employed around 450 people. Having a large budget surplus, they began investing in the settlement's infrastructure. Today there are multiple casinos located in Portorož, such as the Casino Riviera, Grand Casino Portorož, and the Casino Bernardin, located in the Grand Hotel Emona complex, which includes the Hotel Villa Park.

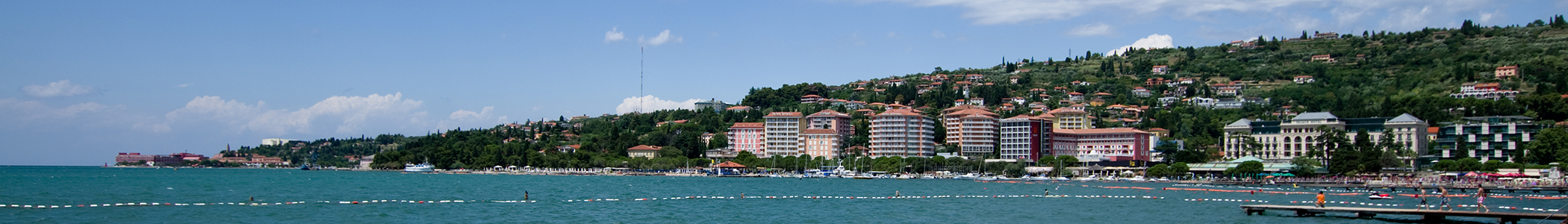

=== Bernardin ===
Bernardin is a tourist complex located in the western part of Portorož. Its name derives from sveti Bernardin ("Saint Bernardino"), as the church, now in ruins, was named. Before the construction of multiple complexes, the area was a shipyard for smaller vessels, later moved to the town of Izola. In 1971, Emona company from Ljubljana established Hoteli Bernardin, and began working on building the complex. In 1976, the first two hotels, Bernardin and Vile Park were built, with Grand hotel Emona following the next year.

The monastery associated with Saint Bernardino's Church, which was built in 1452, was closed in 1806. In 1830, the Austrian military converted the structure into a fortress to guard the Bay of Piran, after which the buildings started to deteriorate.

== Geography ==
=== Location ===
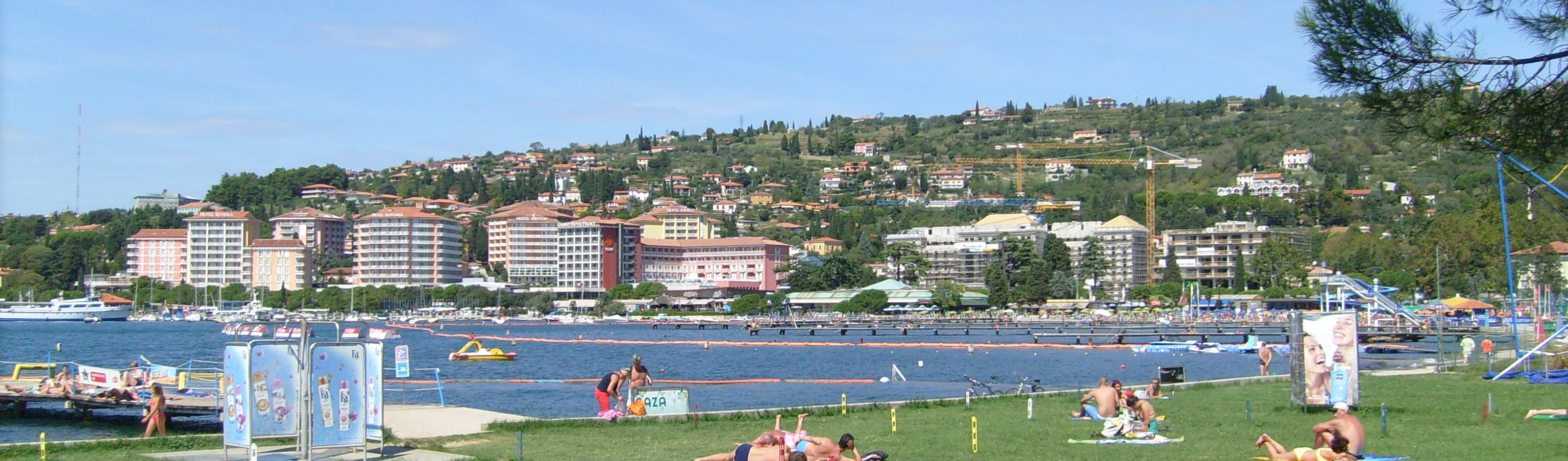
Portorož

Portorož belongs to the coastal municipality of Piran, located in the southwest of the Gulf of Trieste (at the northernmost point of the Adriatic Sea) between the boundaries of Italy to the north and Croatia to the south. Part of Portorož are the streets Fiesa and Pacug. In the southern part near the salt pans there are some old salt warehouses, on the hill of Crocebianca (Beli Križ), there is a viewpoint over the Portorož bay and the Radio Capodistria antenna.

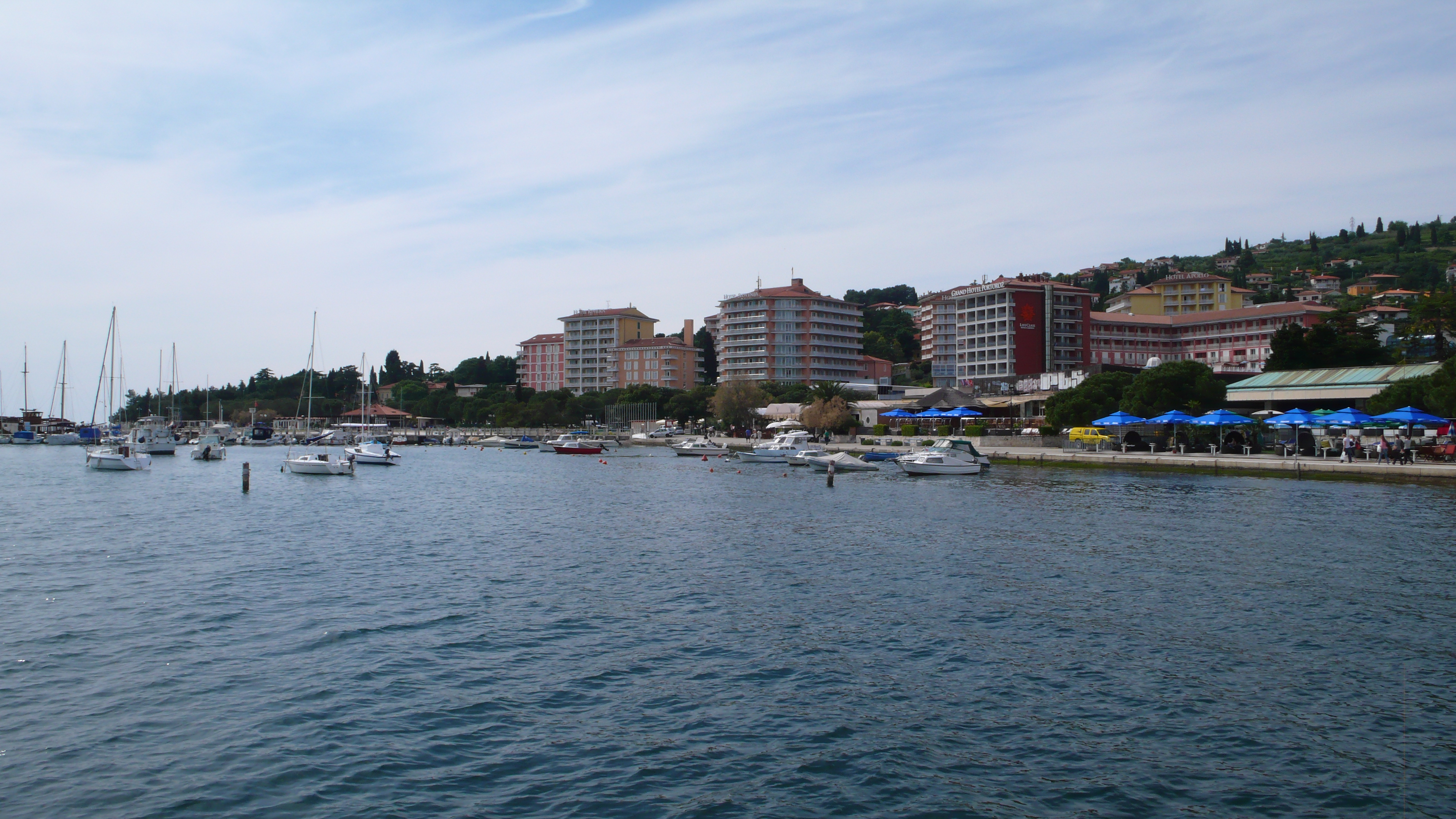
Waterfront

=== Climate ===
Portorož has humid subtropical climate (Köppen climate classification Cfa) with cool winters and warm summers. Winters are cool with a January average of 4.75 °C (40.5 °F) while summers are warm with a July high of 29.4 °C (84.9 °F) and a low of 17.3 °C (63.1 °F). Due to its coastal location, temperatures below −10 °C (14.0 °F) or above 35 °C (95.0 °F) are rare. The average annual precipitation is 947.4 millimetres (37 in) which is fairly distributed throughout the year, though September and October see a peak in precipitation levels. Portorož averages 2,423 hours of sunshine per year.

Climate data for Letališče Portorož, 1991–2020 normals, extremes 1951–2020
Month	Jan	Feb	Mar	Apr	May	Jun	Jul	Aug	Sep	Oct	Nov	Dec	Year
Record high °C (°F)	18.2 (64.8)	22.6 (72.7)	23.4 (74.1)	28.2 (82.8)	33.2 (91.8)	35.6 (96.1)	37.4 (99.3)	37.3 (99.1)	34.3 (93.7)	27.6 (81.7)	24.3 (75.7)	19.1 (66.4)	37.4 (99.3)
Mean daily maximum °C (°F)	9.3 (48.7)	10.5 (50.9)	14.2 (57.6)	18.3 (64.9)	22.7 (72.9)	27.0 (80.6)	29.4 (84.9)	29.5 (85.1)	24.7 (76.5)	19.6 (67.3)	14.5 (58.1)	10.4 (50.7)	19.2 (66.5)
Daily mean °C (°F)	4.9 (40.8)	5.4 (41.7)	8.7 (47.7)	12.6 (54.7)	17.2 (63.0)	21.4 (70.5)	23.4 (74.1)	23.0 (73.4)	18.4 (65.1)	14.1 (57.4)	10.0 (50.0)	6.0 (42.8)	13.8 (56.8)
Mean daily minimum °C (°F)	1.3 (34.3)	1.3 (34.3)	4.2 (39.6)	7.7 (45.9)	11.9 (53.4)	15.6 (60.1)	17.4 (63.3)	17.4 (63.3)	13.8 (56.8)	10.2 (50.4)	6.5 (43.7)	2.4 (36.3)	9.1 (48.4)
Record low °C (°F)	−13.7 (7.3)	−13.1 (8.4)	−10.4 (13.3)	−3.7 (25.3)	0.3 (32.5)	5.1 (41.2)	8.8 (47.8)	7.6 (45.7)	4.2 (39.6)	−1.7 (28.9)	−6.2 (20.8)	−9.9 (14.2)	−13.7 (7.3)
Average precipitation mm (inches)	54 (2.1)	62 (2.4)	56 (2.2)	64 (2.5)	74 (2.9)	78 (3.1)	59 (2.3)	71 (2.8)	122 (4.8)	110 (4.3)	122 (4.8)	87 (3.4)	959 (37.6)
Average snowfall cm (inches)	0.2 (0.1)	1 (0.4)	0.3 (0.1)	0 (0)	0 (0)	0 (0)	0 (0)	0 (0)	0 (0)	0 (0)	0 (0)	1 (0.4)	2.5 (1)
Average precipitation days (≥ 0.1 mm)	9	8	8	10	11	9	7	8	9	10	12	10	111
Mean monthly sunshine hours	102	132	182	212	260	290	334	313	221	162	94	95	2,397
Source: Slovenian Environment Agency (ARSO)

== Arts ==
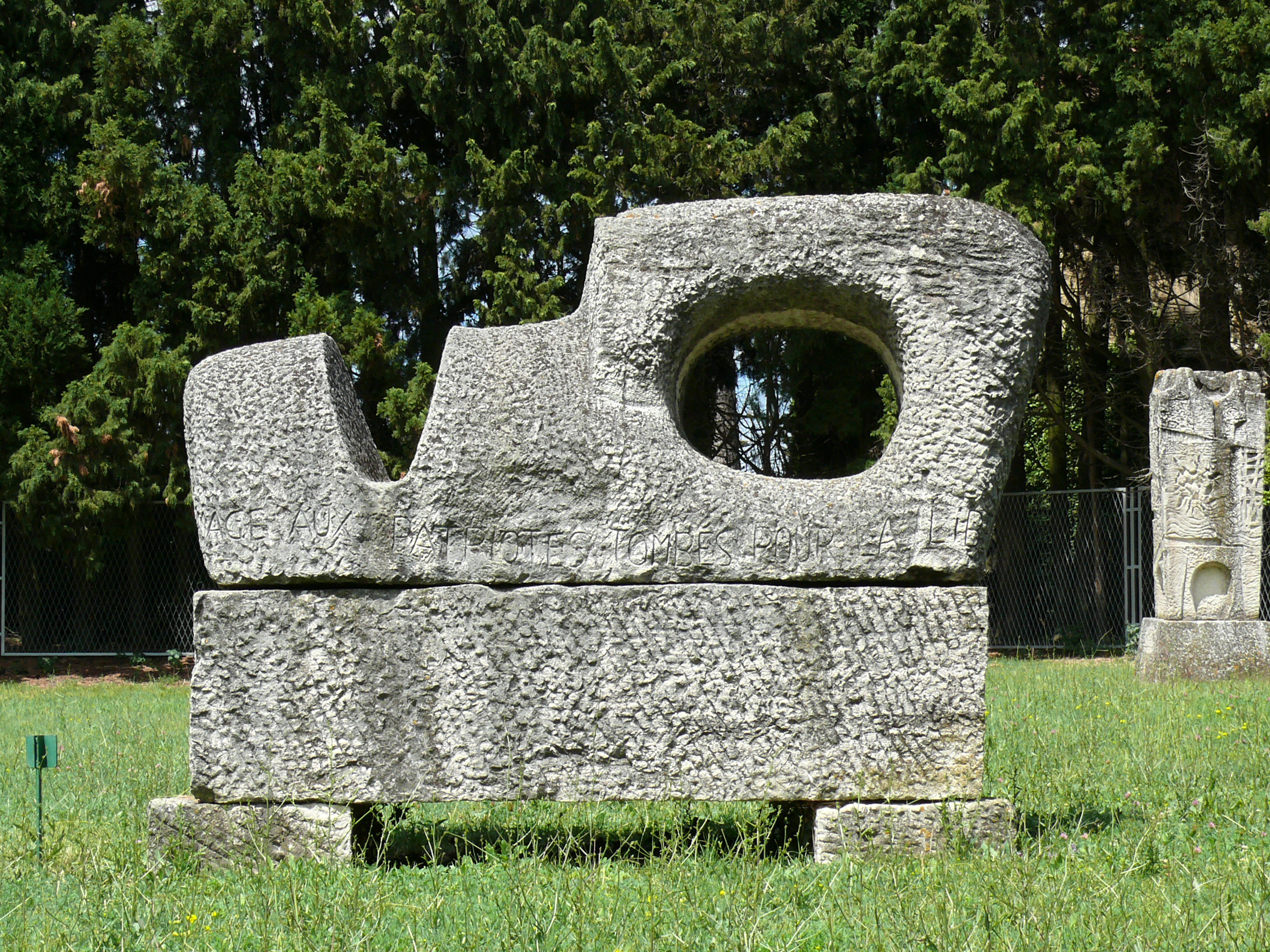
Achiam: Tribute to the Fallen Patriots for Liberty (1963)

Portorož hosts the annual Festival of Slovenian Film (Festival slovenskega filma), with Vesna awards being awarded for the best achievements in Slovenian cinematography.

Since 1961, Portorož has also hosted a contemporary art biennale, the International Forma Viva Sculpture Workshop. The works are on display at Forma Via in a sculpture park above the village of Seča.

The settlement is also home to The Rolling Stones Museum, one of the most unique ones of its type in the world.

== Sports ==
Portorož was a home of the Banka Koper Slovenia Open tennis tournament of WTA Tour from 2005 to 2010. Since 2013 the Tilia Slovenia Open, a men's ATP Challenger tournament, takes place every summer on the same courts of the ŠRC Marina.

In 1958, the Portorož international chess tournament was won by Mikhail Tal; Bobby Fischer finished sixth, and was awarded the title of grandmaster at the (then) record age of 15. Tal went on subsequently to win the candidates tournament and the world title of 1960.

Portorož was host to the International Physics Olympiad in 1985 and the European Universities Debating Championships in 2001.

In 2008, the new Euro-Mediterranean University of Slovenia was inaugurated in collaboration with universities of the EU, the Middle East, and North Africa.

In 2023, Portorož hosted the European Girls' Mathematical Olympiad.
