= Masumi =

Masumi is a unisex Japanese given name. Notable people with the name include:

== People ==
- Masumi Aoki (青木 益未; born 1994), Japanese athlete
- Masumi Asano (浅野 真澄; born 1977), Japanese voice actress, singer and narrator
- Masumi Aya (綾 真澄; born 1980), Japanese hammer thrower
- Masumi Fuchise (渕瀬 真寿美; born 1986), Japanese racewalker
- Masumi Hamachi (浜地 真澄; born 1998), Japanese professional baseball player
- Masumi Harukawa (春川 ますみ; born 1935), Japanese actress
- Masumi Hayashi (disambiguation)
- Masumi Hayashi (1945–2006), American photographer and artist
- Masumi Hoshino (星野 真澄; born 1984), Japanese former professional baseball pitcher
- Masumi Ishiyama (born 1981), Japanese former cricketer
- Masumi Itō (伊藤 真澄), Japanese singer and composer
- Masumi Kuwata (桑田 真澄; born 1968), Japanese former right-handed pitcher
- Masumi Mishina (桑田 真澄; born 1982), Japanese softball player
- Masumi Mitsui (1887–1987), Japanese-Canadian veteran of World War I
- Masumi Miyazaki (宮崎 萬純; born 1968), Japanese actress and model
- Masumi Okada (岡田 眞澄; 1935–2006), Japanese-French professional actor, singer, stand-up comedian, and film producer
- Masumi Okawa (大川 真澄; born 1978), Japanese gymnast
- Masumi Ono (小野 真澄; born 1975), Japanese athlete
- Masumi Oshima (大島 真寿美; born 1962), Japanese writer
- Masumi Tazawa (田澤 茉純; born 1993), Japanese voice actress
- Masumi Uno (宇野 満寿美; born 1932), Japanese watercolor painter
- Sachiko Masumi (桝見 咲智子; born 1984), Japanese long jumper

== Fictional characters ==
- Masumi, the main character of Swan
- Masumi, a character in the manga version of Candy Boy
- Masumi Inou, in Search Guard Successor Foundation
- Masumi Nishijima, in Future Diary
- Masumi Sera, a character from Detective Conan
- Masumi Soda, a character from Red Data Girl
- Masumi Ageo, the character of Crayon Shin-Chan
- Masumi Usui (碓氷真澄), a character from the video game A3!

== See also ==
- 4293 Masumi, a main-belt asteroid
