= Cusi Masuda =

Japanese-American Contemporary Artist

Masami Masuda (Masuda Masami, born June 1944), known professionally as Cusi Masuda, is a Japanese-American artist, sculptor and painter.

Born in Shizuoka prefecture, Matsuda attended Musashino Art University in Japan. He then worked on sculptures, taking part in then Yugoslavian (now Slovenia) Forma Viva 1970 in Maribor before moving to New York City in late 1970. After he moved to New York City, he participated in the 1981 Whitney Counterweight. He continues to make art in New York. He took on the name Cusi because of his admiration of and deep reverence for Romanian artist Brancusi. He has been featured in multiple art publications including Artforum, Art in America, and Sulfur. He also has a minor role in the 2013 documentary, Cutie and the Boxer. His work Eternal performance for the 50th anniversary of Hiroshima is included in the Joan Flasch Artists' Book Collection at the School of the Art Institute of Chicago. Masuda's work was also included in Out of Actions - Aktionismus, Body Art & Performance, 1949-1979 at the Museum of Applied Arts, Vienna in 1998
