= Achiam =

French sculptor

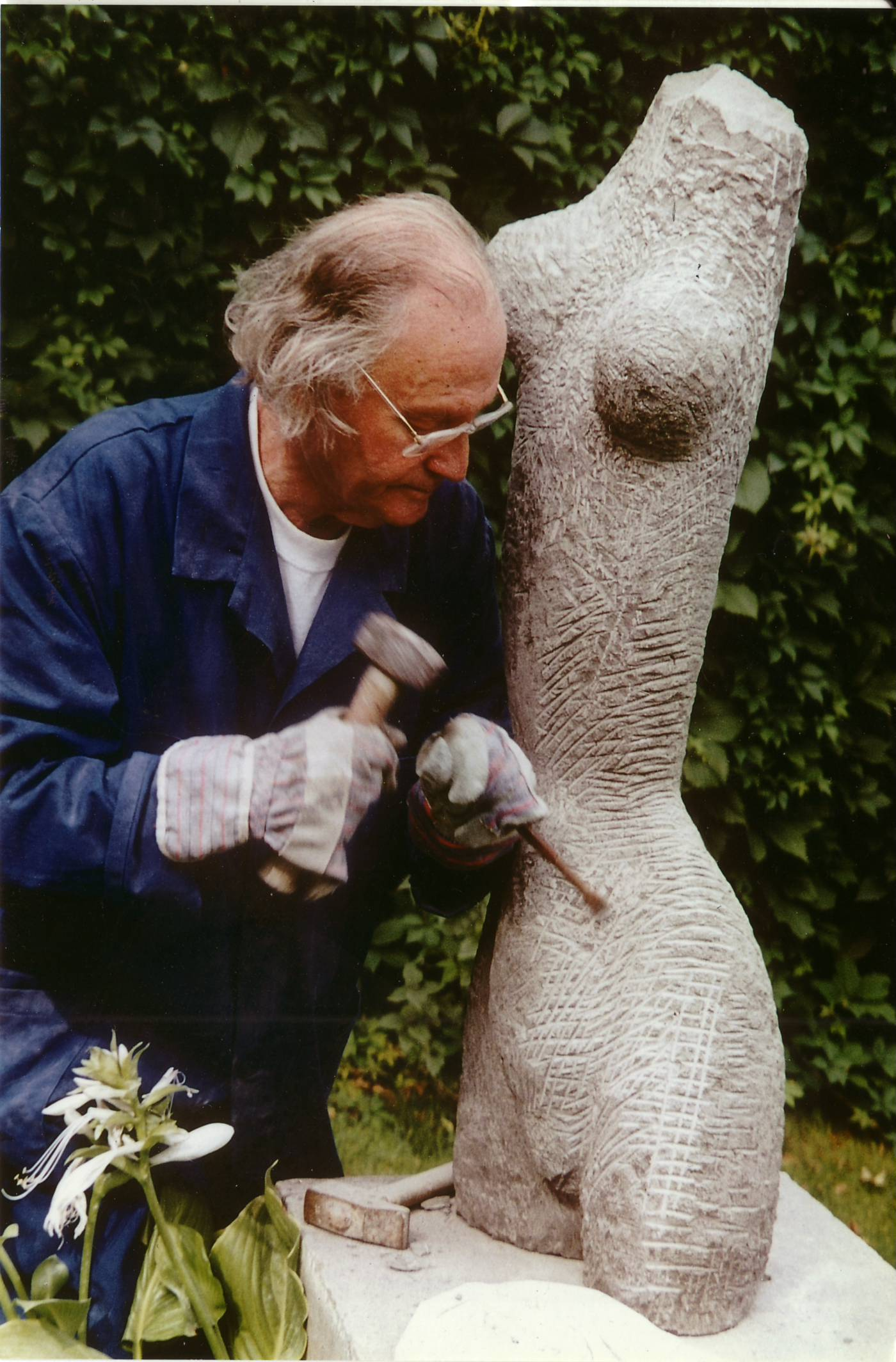
- Achiam sculpturing Torso of dancer (Basalt)
- Born: Ahiam Shoshany; February 10, 1916
- Died: March 26, 2005 (aged 89); Paris
- Awards: Grand Prix des Beaux-Arts de Paris in 1965

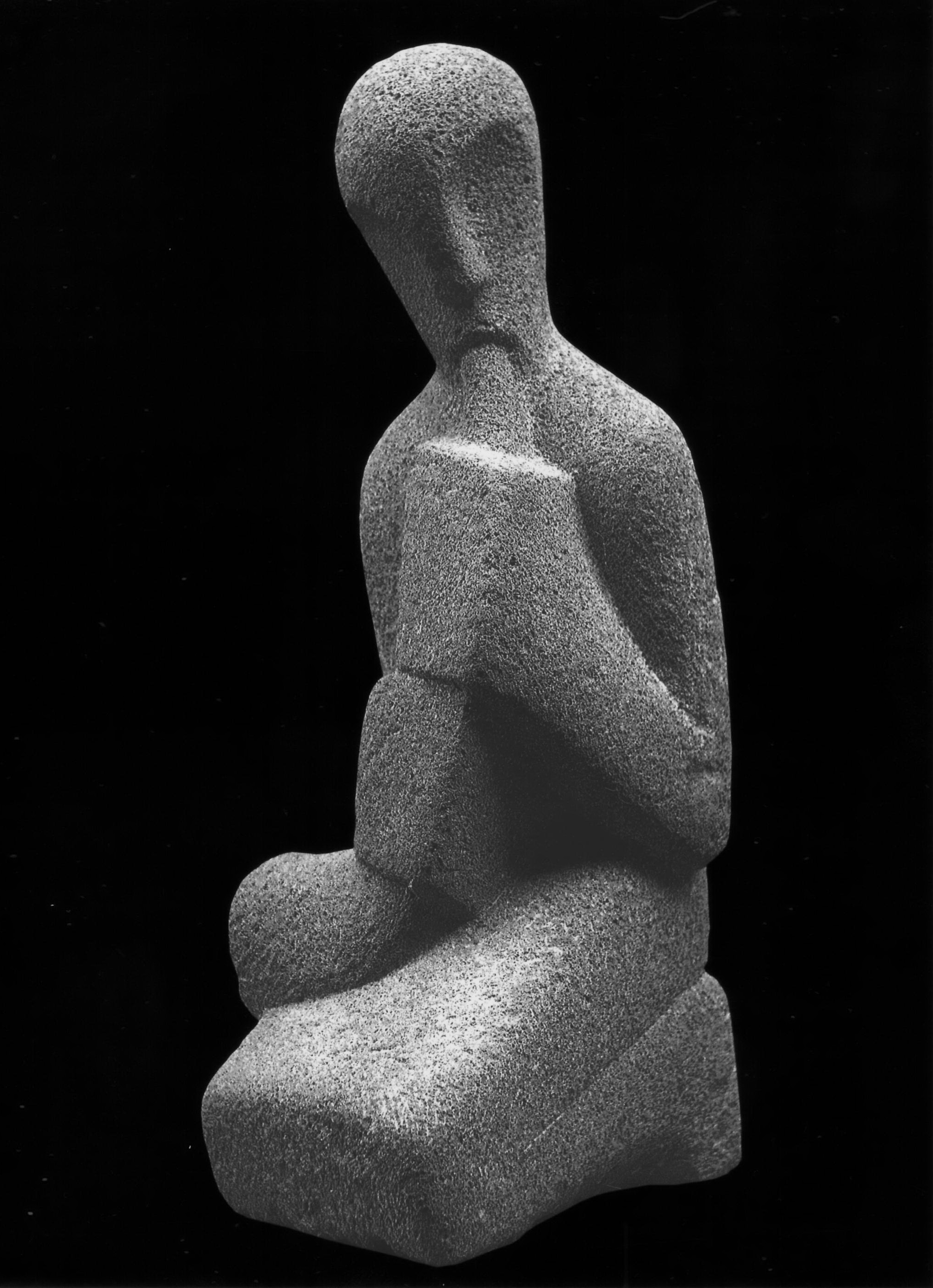
"Horn player" - Basalt, Grand-Prix des Beaux-Arts de la Ville de Paris 1965.

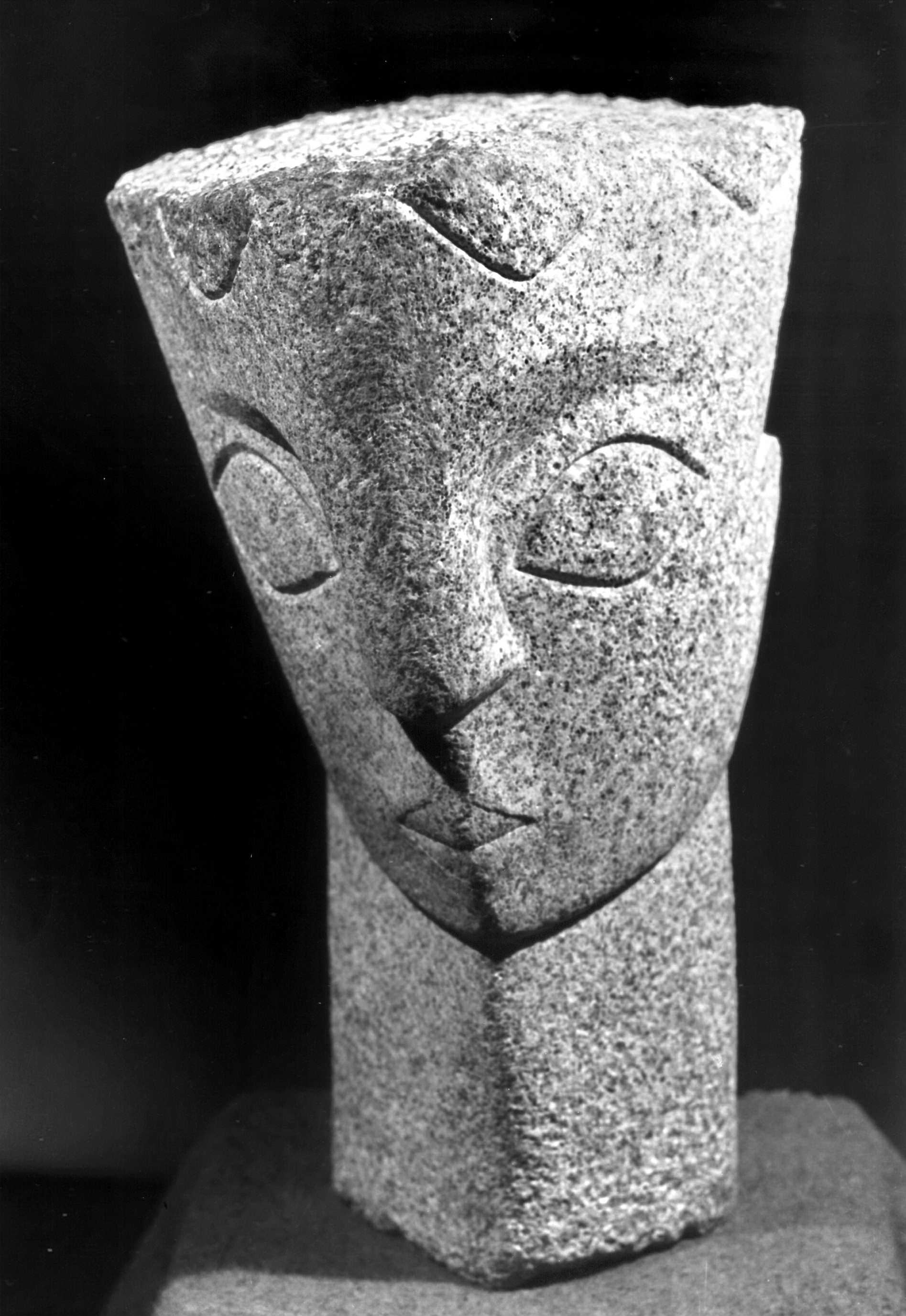
"King David" - Granite, Shuni museum.

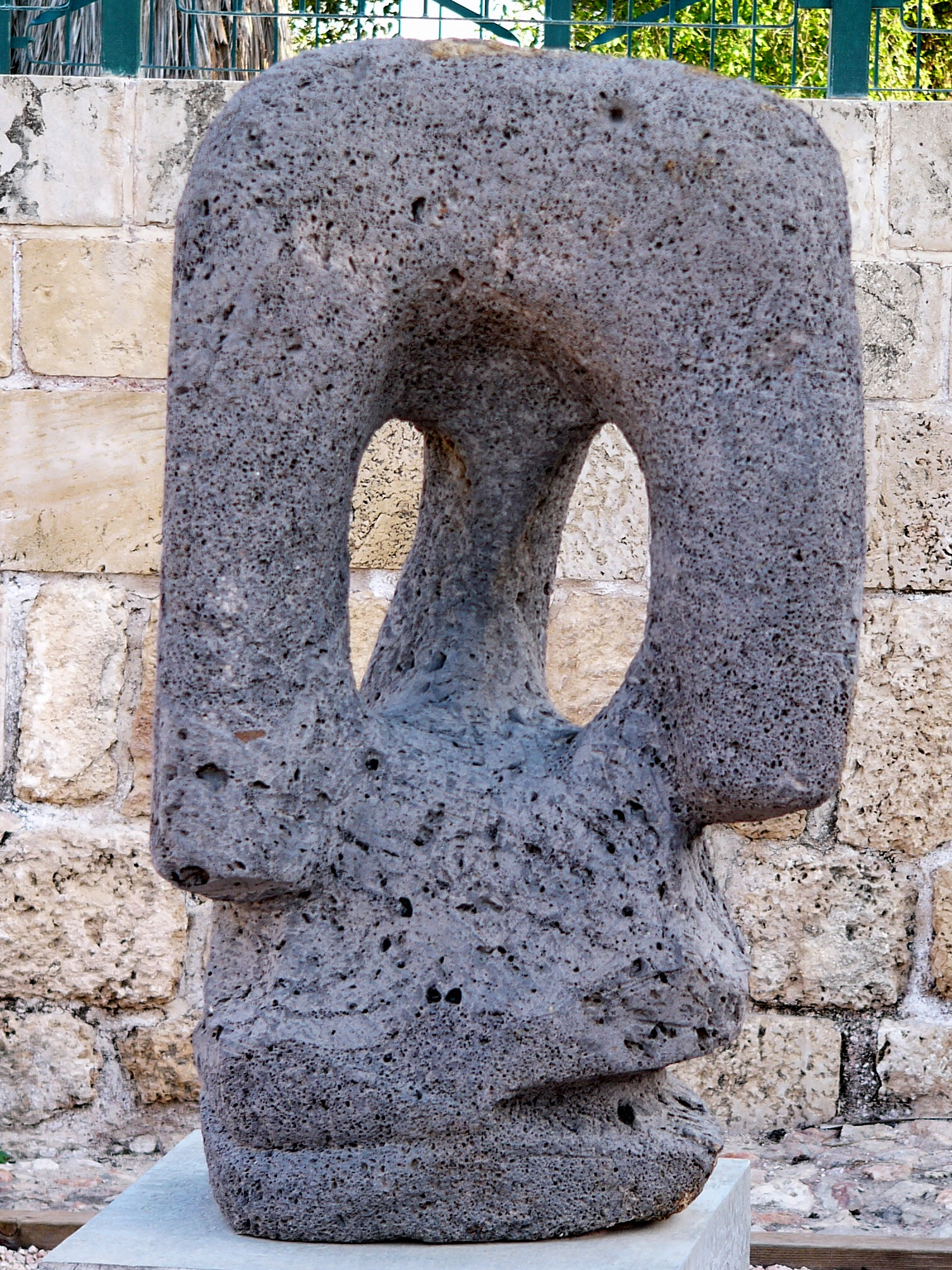
"Three-face head" - Basalt, Shuni museum.

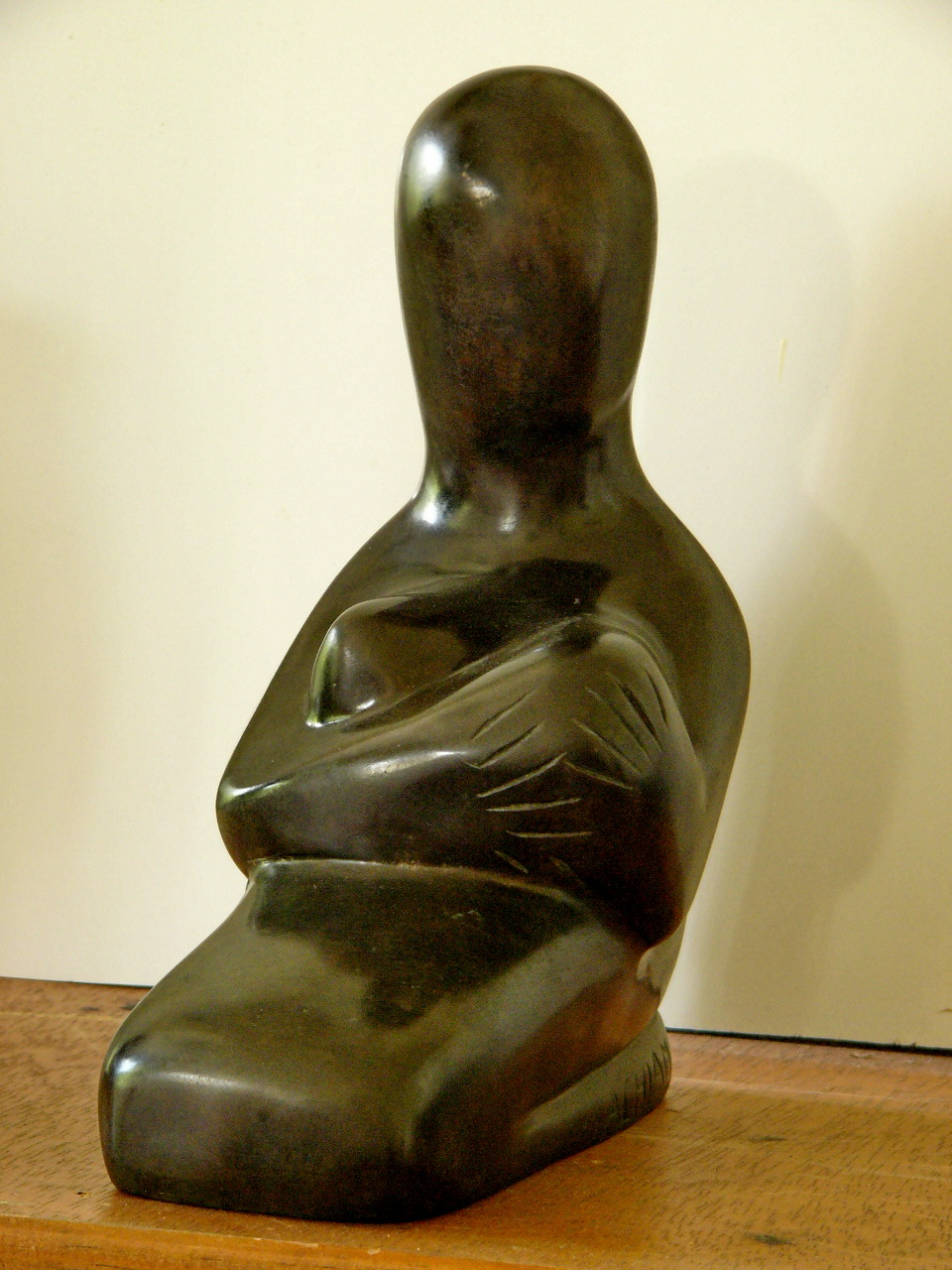
"Breast-feeding" - Bronze

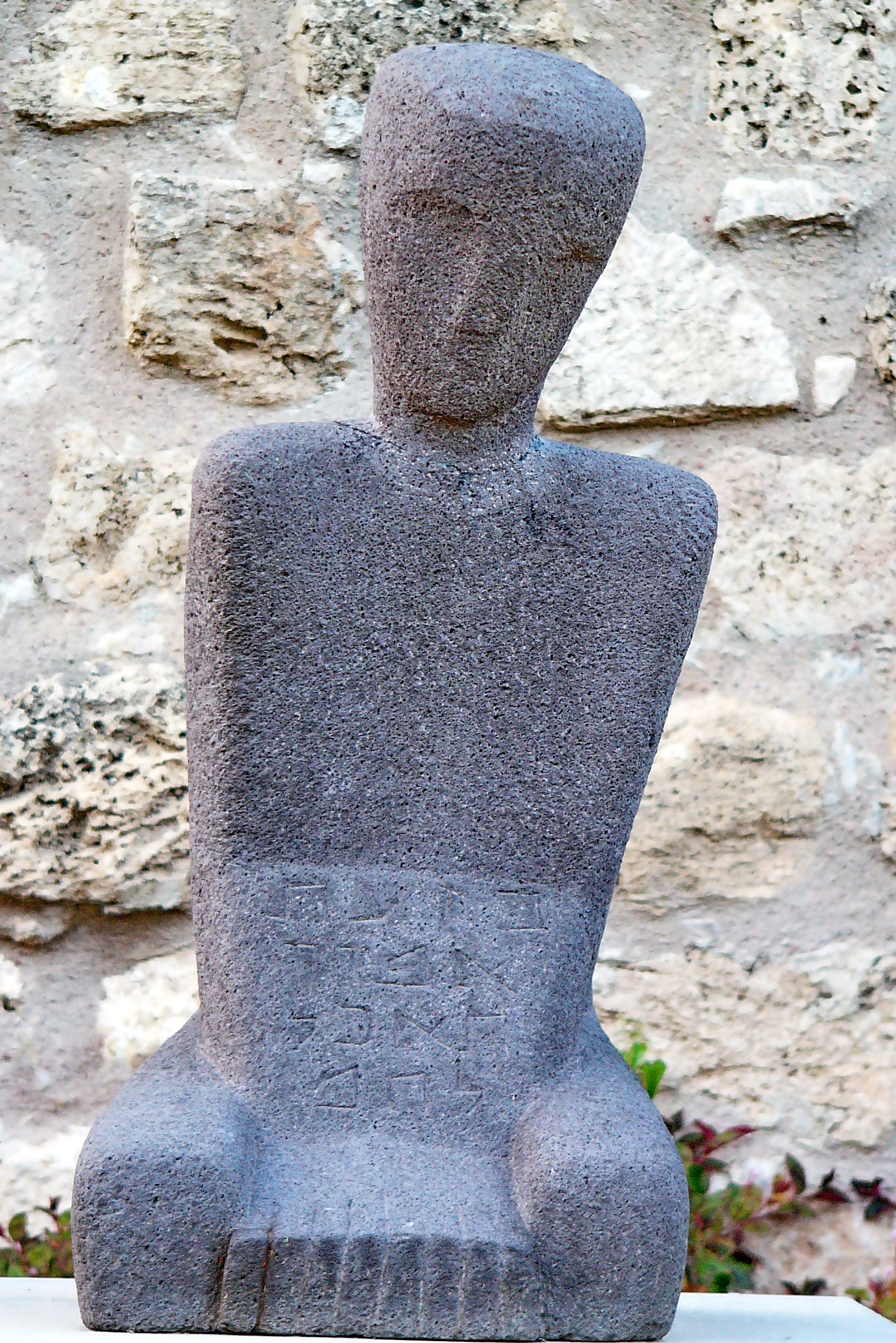
"Adam": In the sweat of thy face shalt thou eat bread - basalt, Shuni museum, Israel.

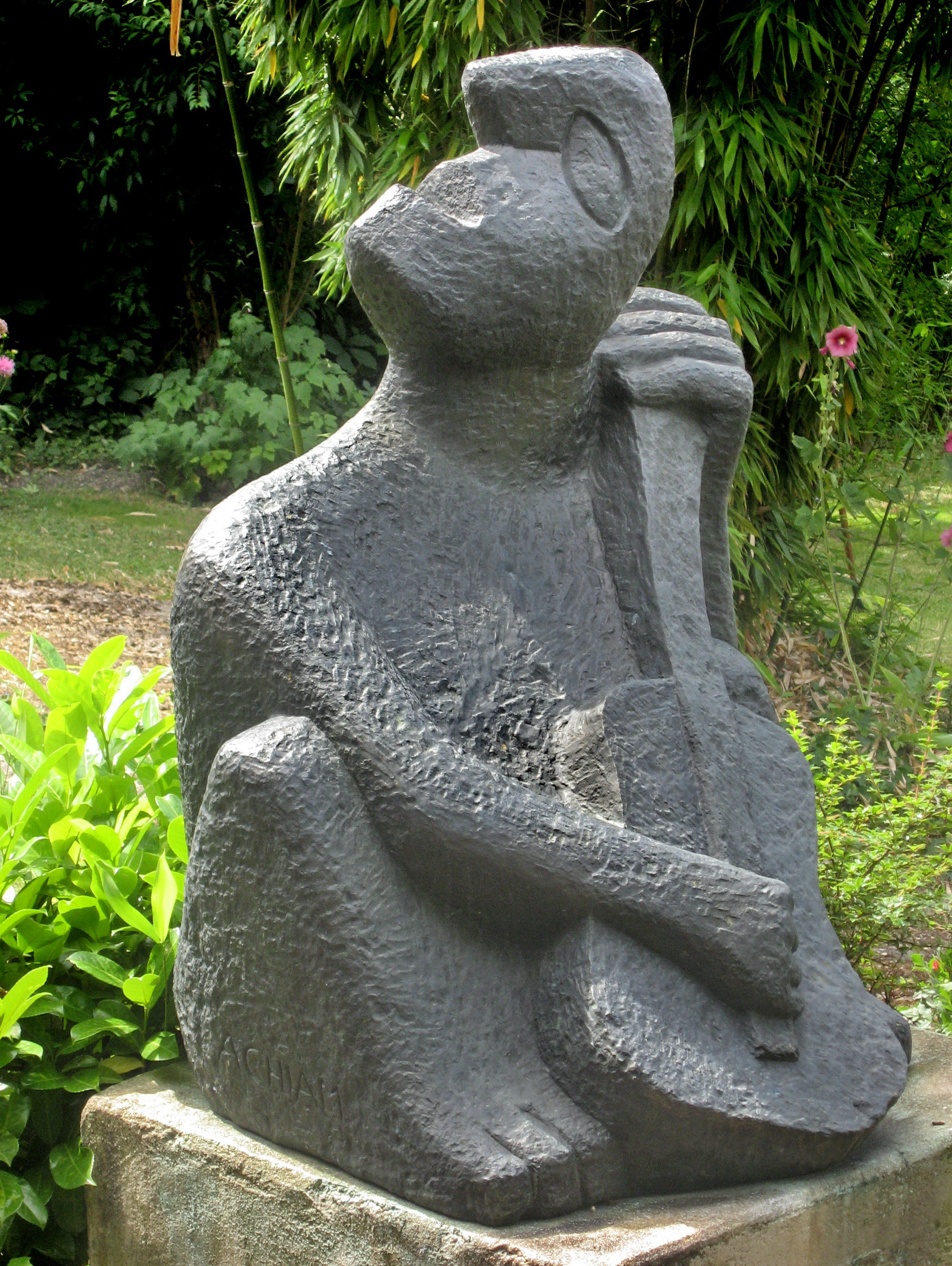
"Guitar player", bronze.

Achiam (born Ahiam Shoshany; February 10, 1916 – March 26, 2005) was a Franco-Israeli sculptor who worked around Paris after 1947. His work consists largely of direct carvings in stone and wood—very plain, pure forms, mostly figurative.

== Biography ==
Achiam was born in Beit-Gan (today part of Yavne'el), in the Galilee and had a peasant's childhood. His early education was in agronomy. Arrested by the British because off his political activities, he discovered his talent as a sculptor while carving bas-reliefs on the walls of his jail cell. He learned sculpture techniques by working as a stone cutter in the quarries of Jerusalem.

In 1947 he was invited to Prague where he won the Grand Prix in the competition for the rebuilding of the martyred town of Lidice in the Czech Republic. He then went to Paris as did many artists at this time.

In Paris, he worked with scrap stones, in a style of naïve art that was quickly recognized by Jean Dubuffet. He was also noticed by Michel Tapié, head of the René Drouin Gallery where his work was exhibited in 1948.

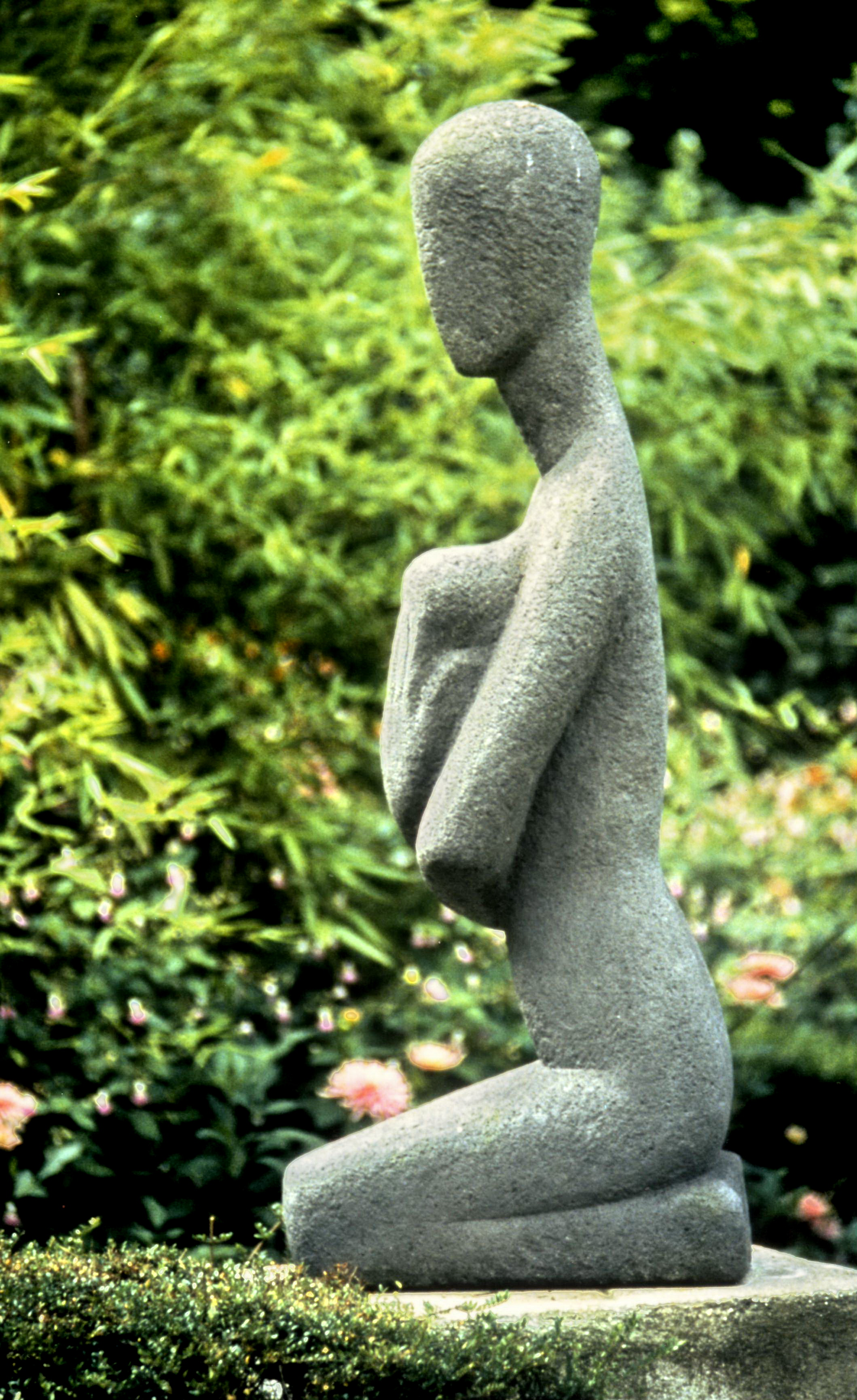
Mother with child - Basalt

Experimenting with other styles, he spent time in Montparnasse and particularly at La Coupole. There he met other renowned artists of the time including Salvador Dalí, Zadkine (with whom he had many disputes) Pablo Picasso and Brâncuși whose simplified forms he admired.

He regularly took part in many exhibitions (such as La Jeune Sculpture, Comparaisons and Le Salon d’Automne), winning recognitions such as the Grand Prix des Beaux-Arts de Paris in 1965.

Achiam did not consider himself part of any artistic school and he did not wish to teach.

At first little known in Israel, his work was discovered during major exhibitions organized by the Open Museum of Tefen (Galilee). In 2003 an Achiam Museum, displaying over a hundred of his works was created in the thermal baths of the Roman amphitheatre of Shuni in Binyamina in Israel (Jabotinsky Park).

It is possible to see Achiam's monumental works in Sèvres, where he lived, in the five municipalities of the conurbation of Arc de Seine (92), in the schools of Saint-Mamet (Cantal) and Saint-Martin d'Hères, in kibbutz Yifat (Israel) and in the Lavon Sculpture Garden (Israel), at Sankt Margarethen im Burgenland (Austria) as well as in Portorož (Slovenia).

== Presentation of the work ==
Achiam explained:

If realist sculpture does not satisfy me, abstract sculpture—looking for purely aesthetic forms—doesn't satisfy me either. I consider that abstract forms which are beautiful by themselves and can be perfect relative to their three dimensions can gain an additional dimension, a ‘fourth’ one, when they express human meaning. For me this is essential because if I also look for beautiful forms I want them to express love, joy, sadness, etc. I am sure that there is much to achieve in this domain.

If, like Brâncuși, I use forms that are themselves abstract, I try to build a composition that is close to man and his feelings. It is easy to see, for instance, that one of my sculptures, the Horn Player, originating with abstract forms, is, in fact, a figurative sculpture suggesting the shepherd I once was in Galilee.

The art of Achiam is therefore centered on Man, Woman, their feelings, love, childbirth and nurture. He often expressed his opposition to wars, suffering and the injustice which oppresses humanity.

Another major source of his inspiration comes from the Bible, from its heroes, prophets and kings, whose essential characteristics he represents while rejecting anecdote in order to express their universal meaning.

Music allowed him to express a search for fusion between man and the musical instrument. His works often represent a variety of feelings in the same character, in the same composition. He also depicts familiar animals such as dogs and cats.

After a long period of studying the stone to find a subject that "fits" the stone, Achiam created his works by cutting direct without using a model or making a sketch or prototype. He chose hard stone for his monumental works (granite, basalt, sandstone) and more sensual stone for his interior pieces (alabaster, serpentinite).

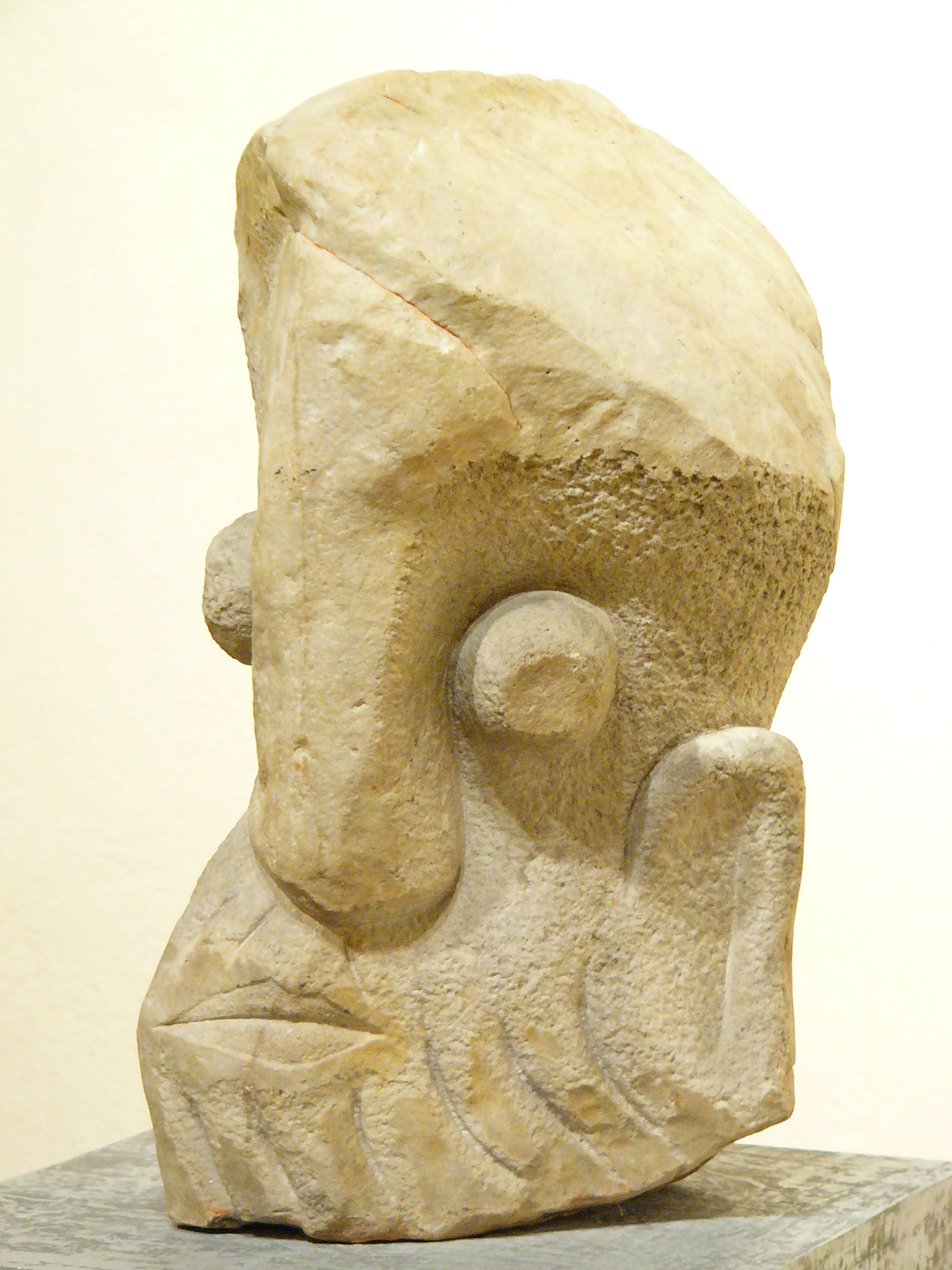
The Prophet (Quartz)

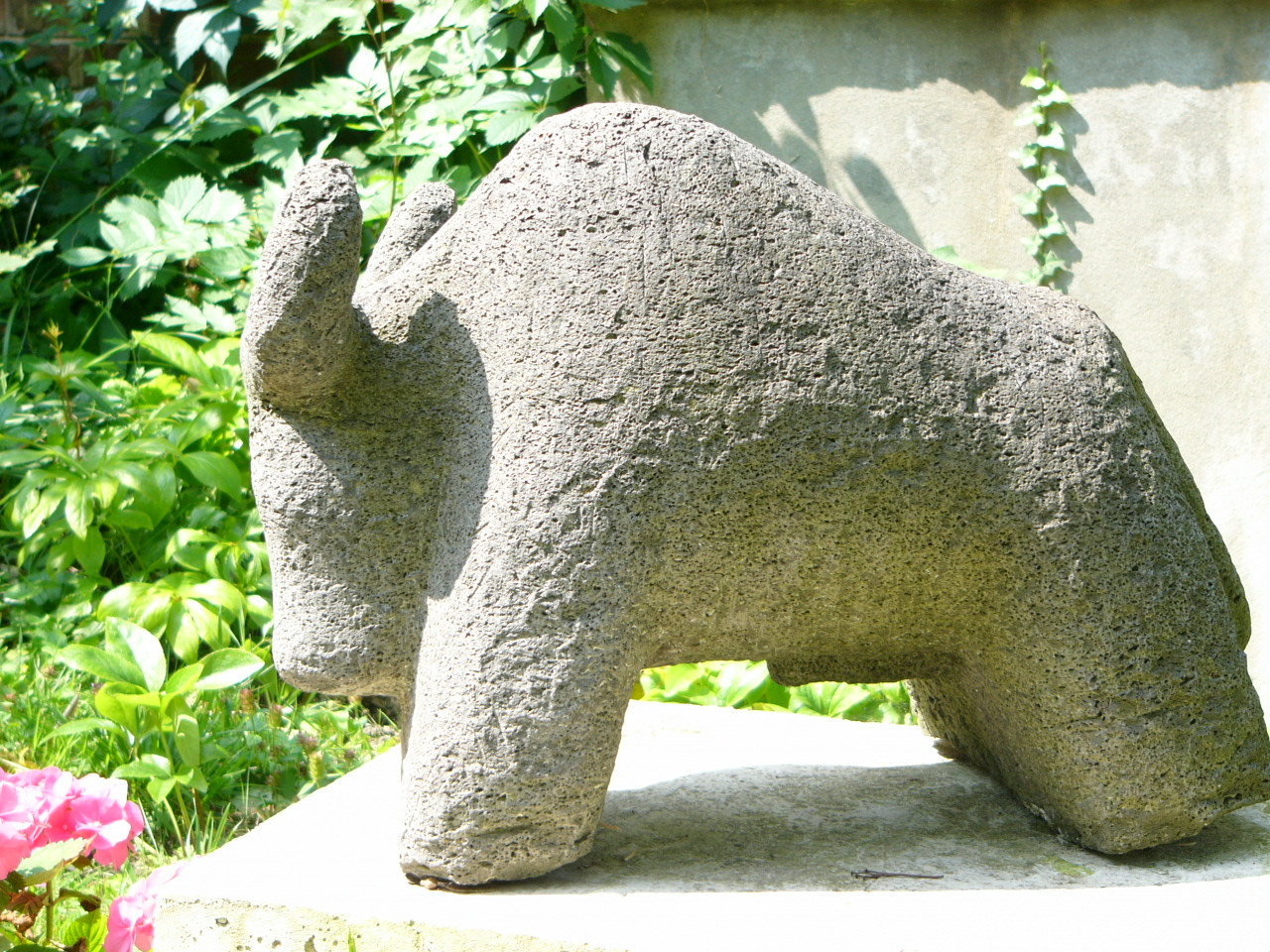
Buffalo (Basalt)

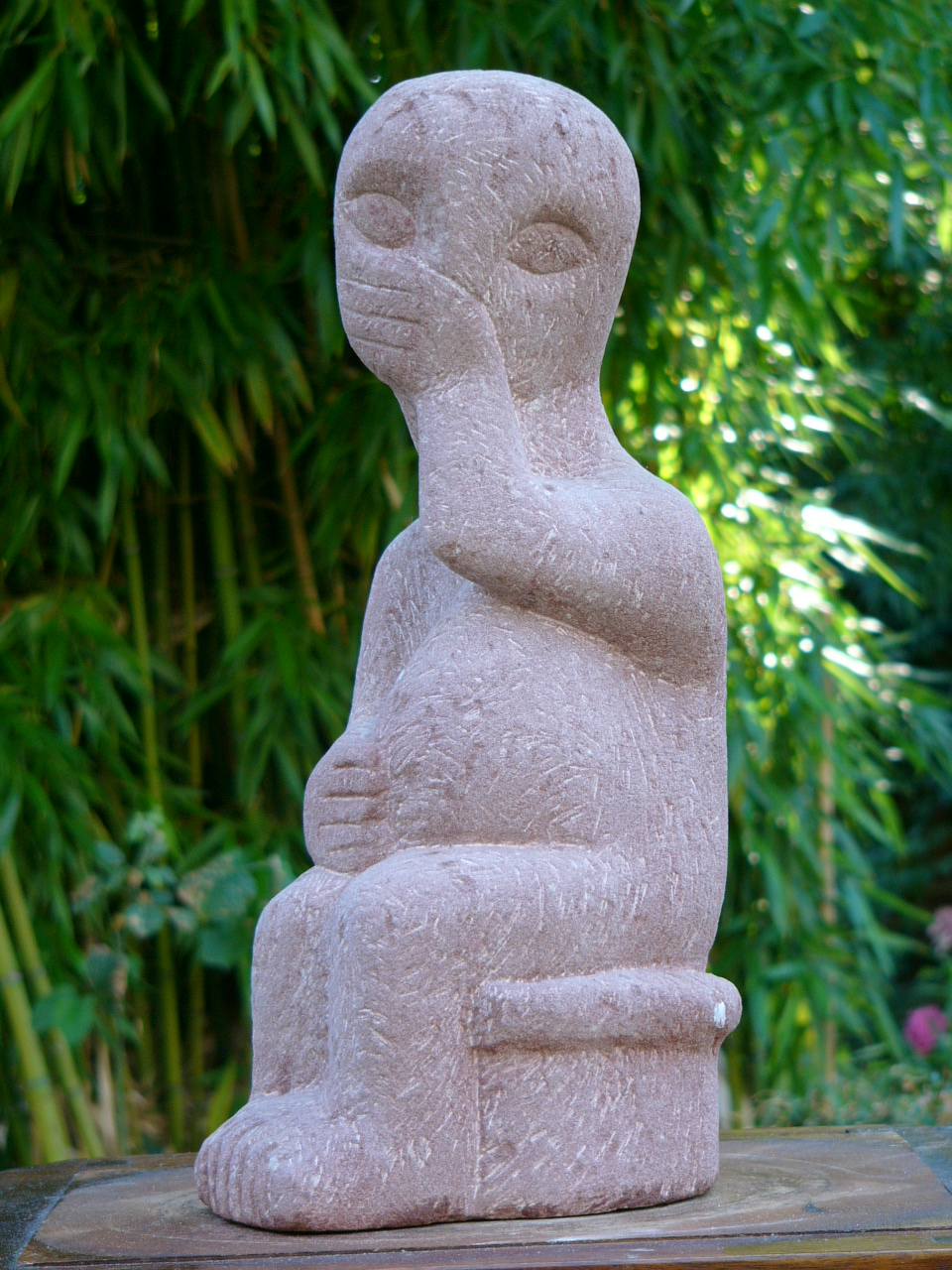
Baby using the potty
(Red sandstone)
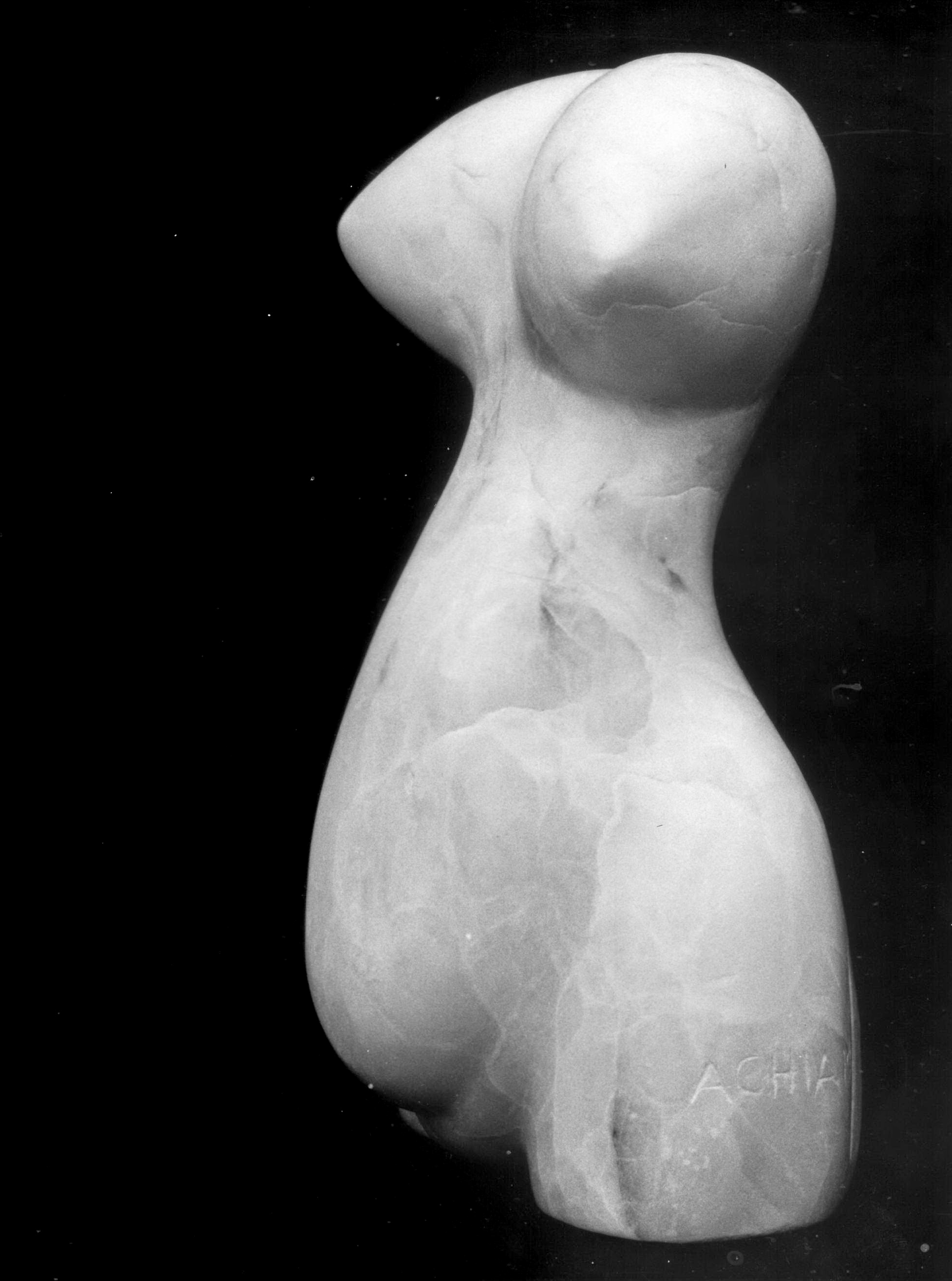
Belly dancing (Alabaster)

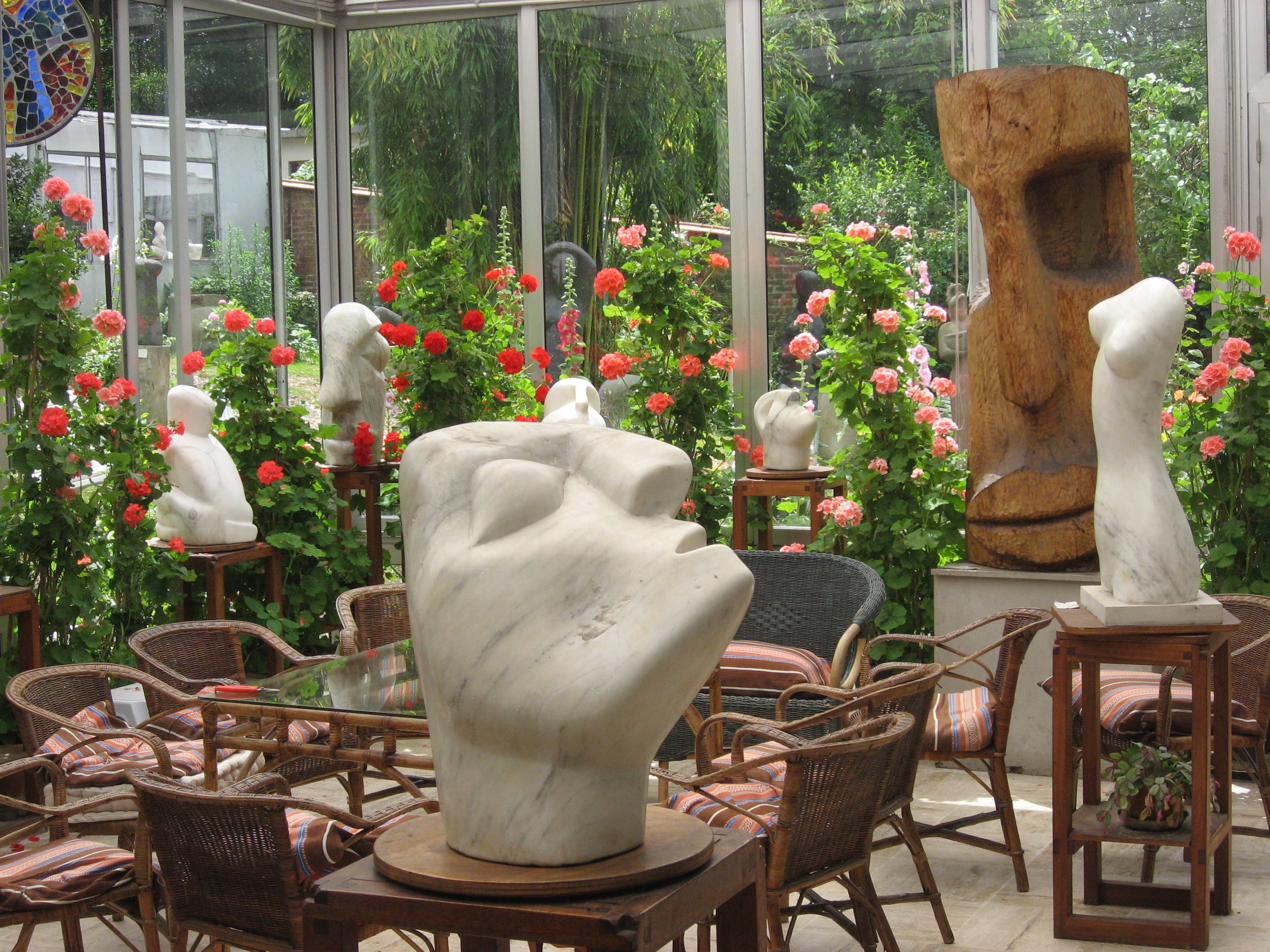
The Scream
(Maurienne marble)

== Awards ==
- 1965 : Grand Prix des Beaux-Arts de la ville de Paris in 1965
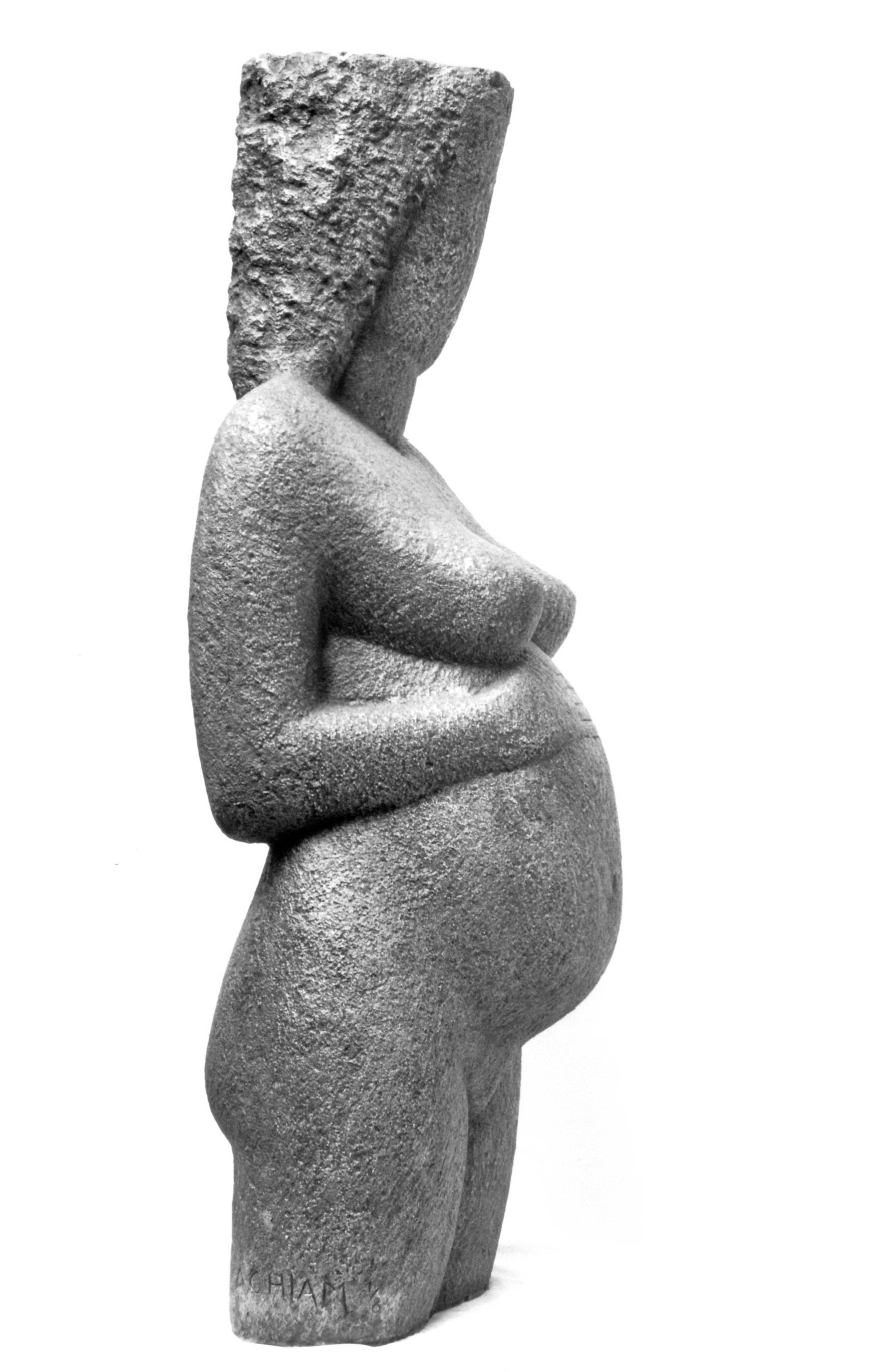
Pregnant woman (Bronze)
Shuni museum

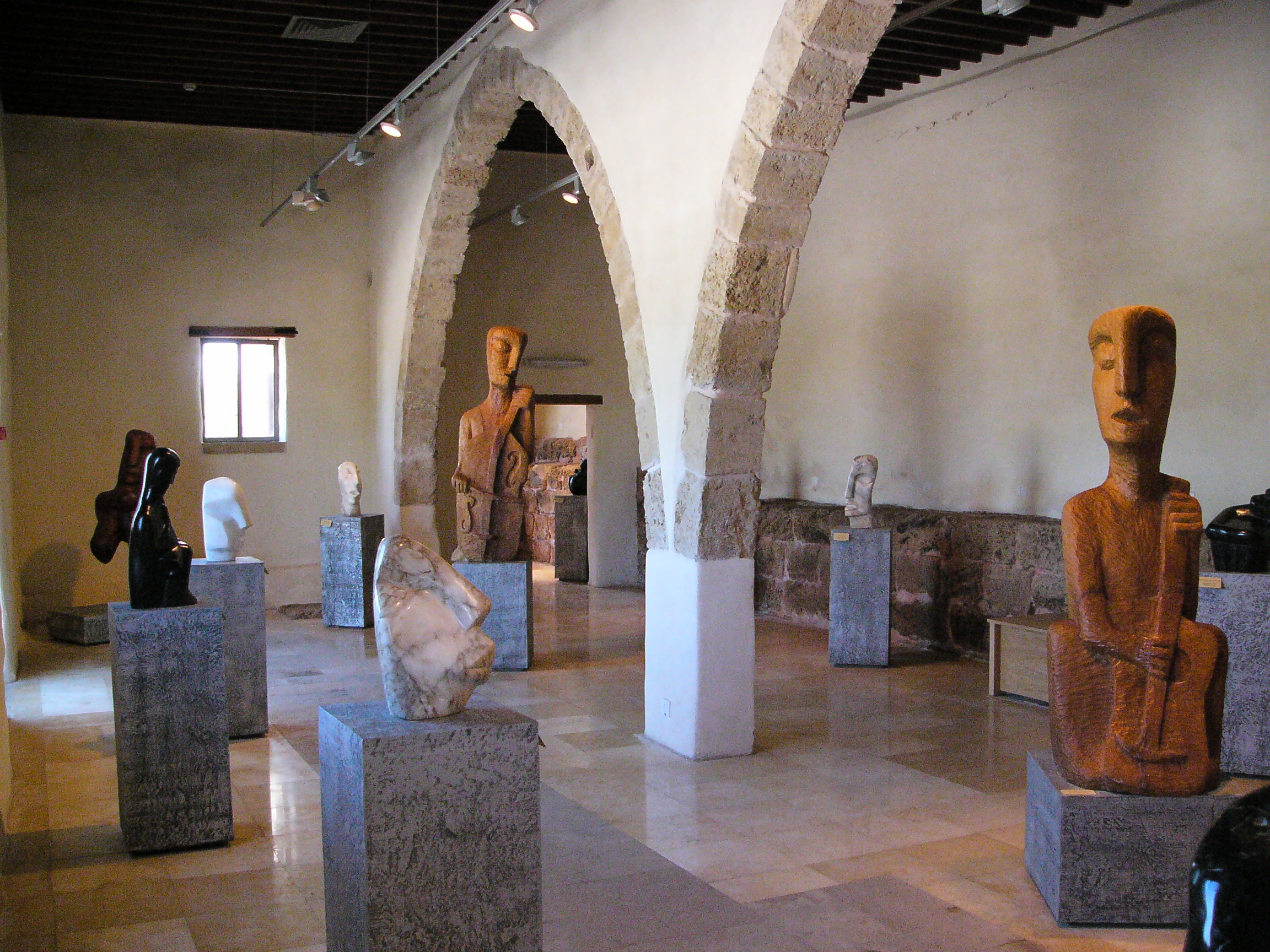
A gallery in Shuni museum

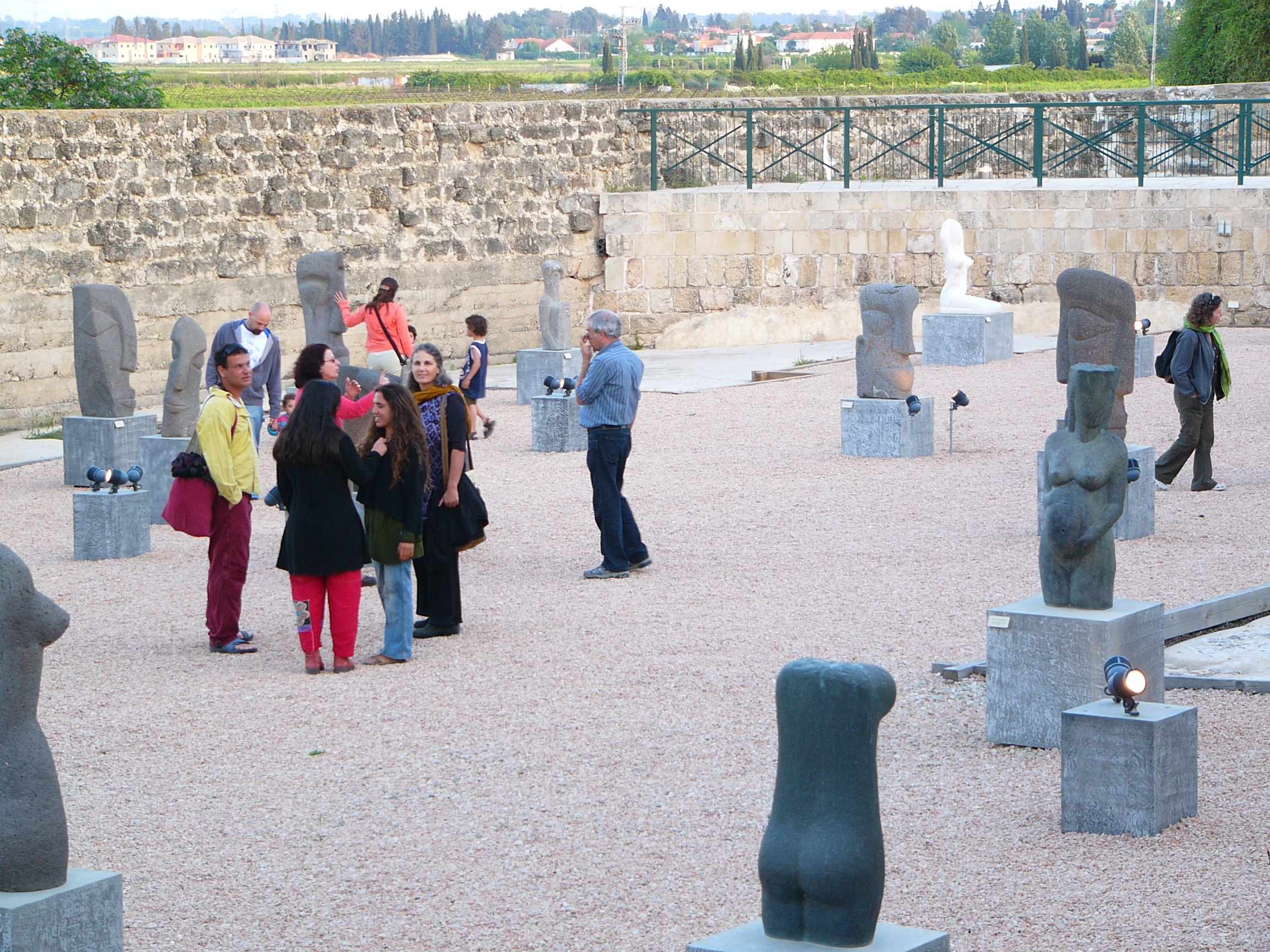
The swimming pool of former Roman baths of Shuni was redesigned to accommodate monumental works of Achiam

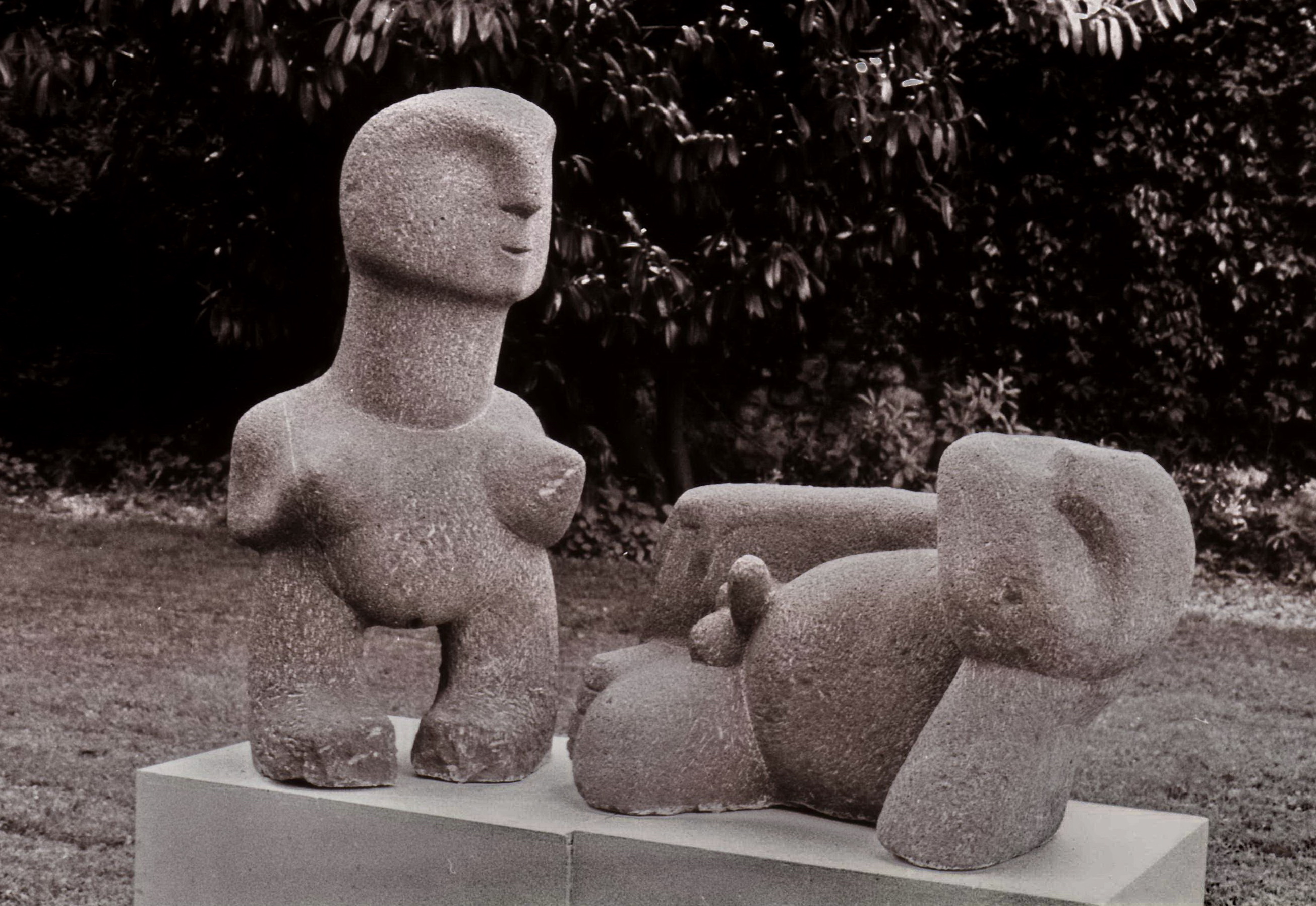
Adam and Eve at the Open Museum of Tefen (Israel)

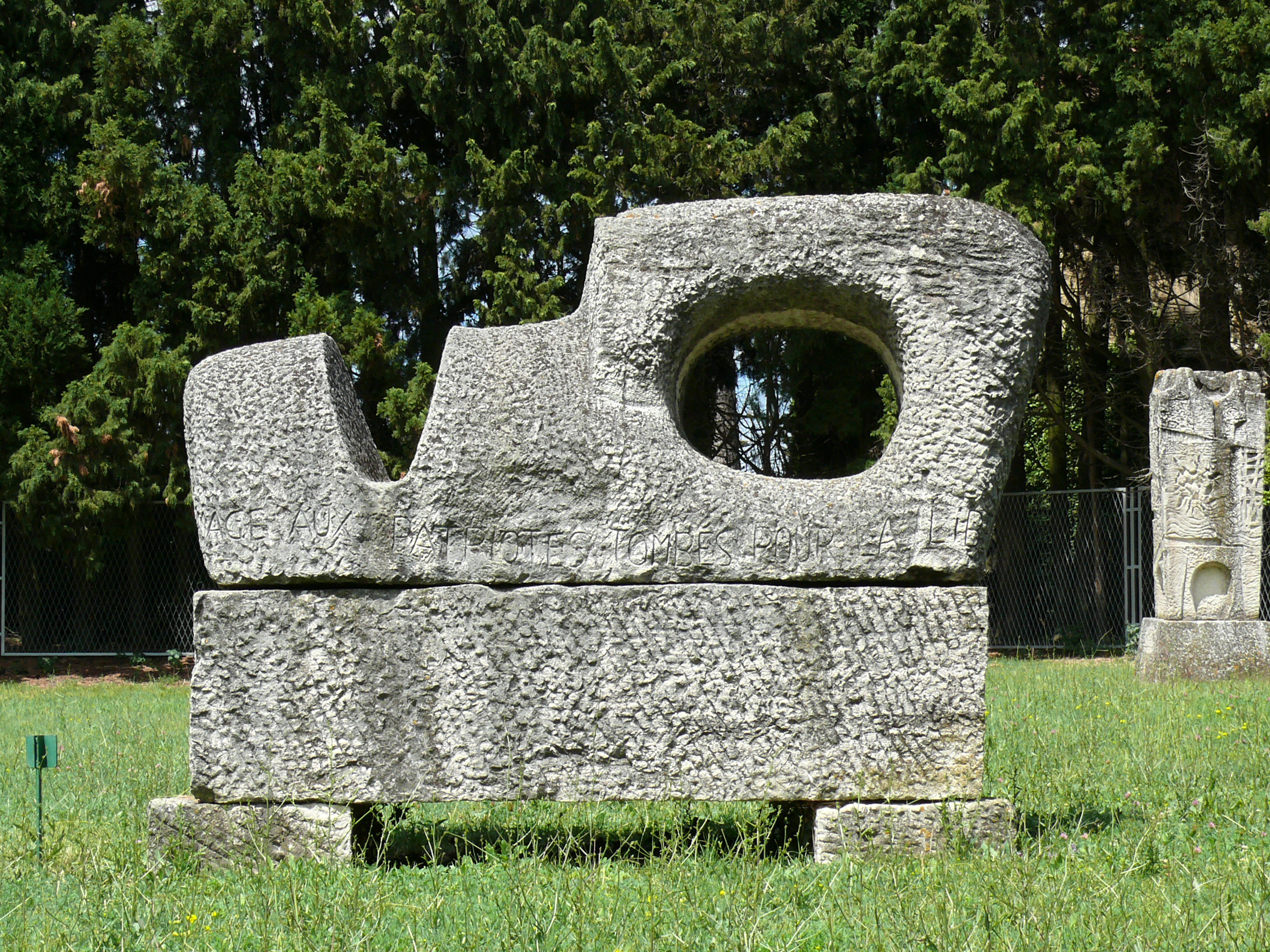
Forma Viva 1963: Tribute to the Fallen Patriots for Liberty nearby Portorož, (Slovenia)

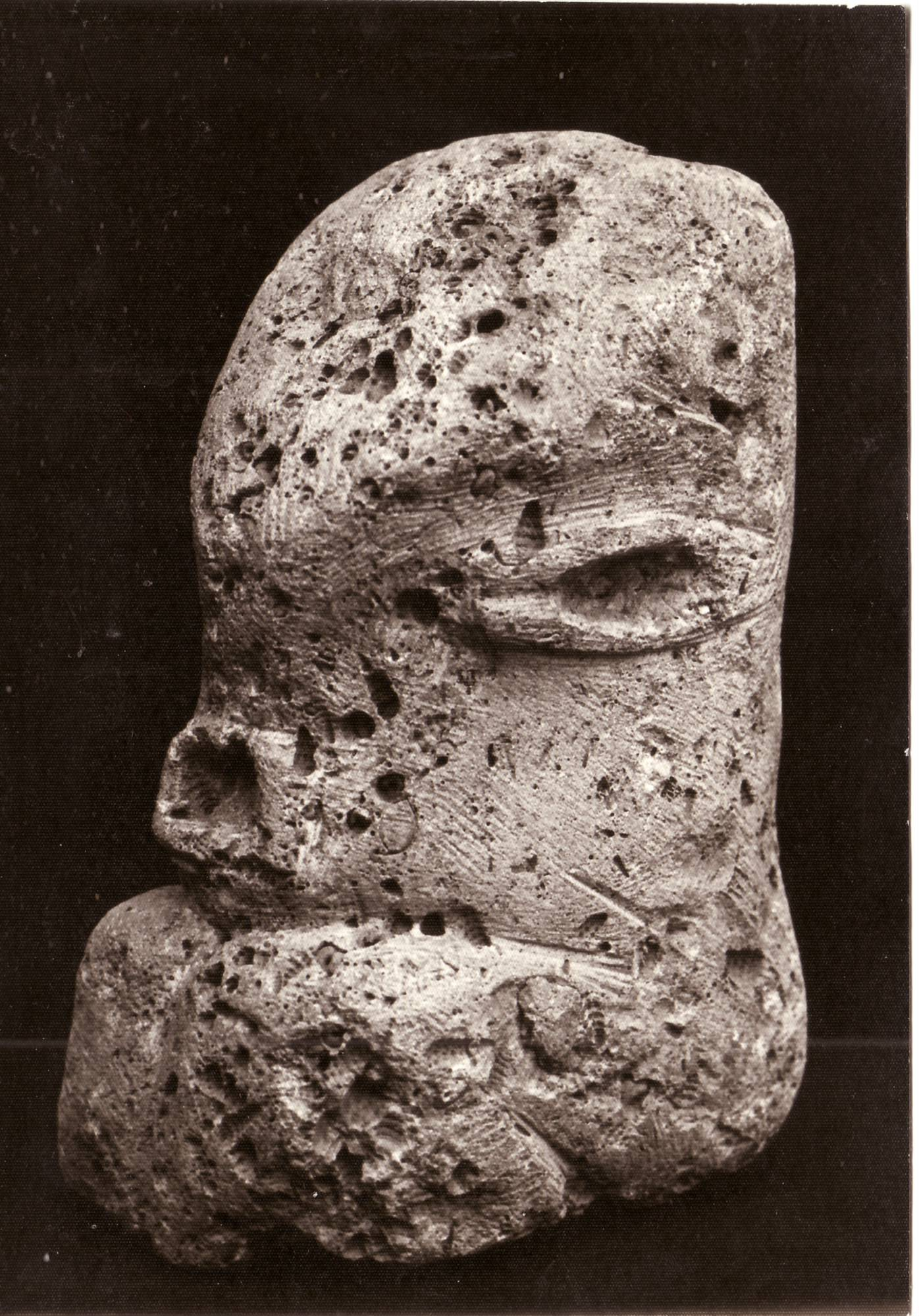
Baby
Limestone

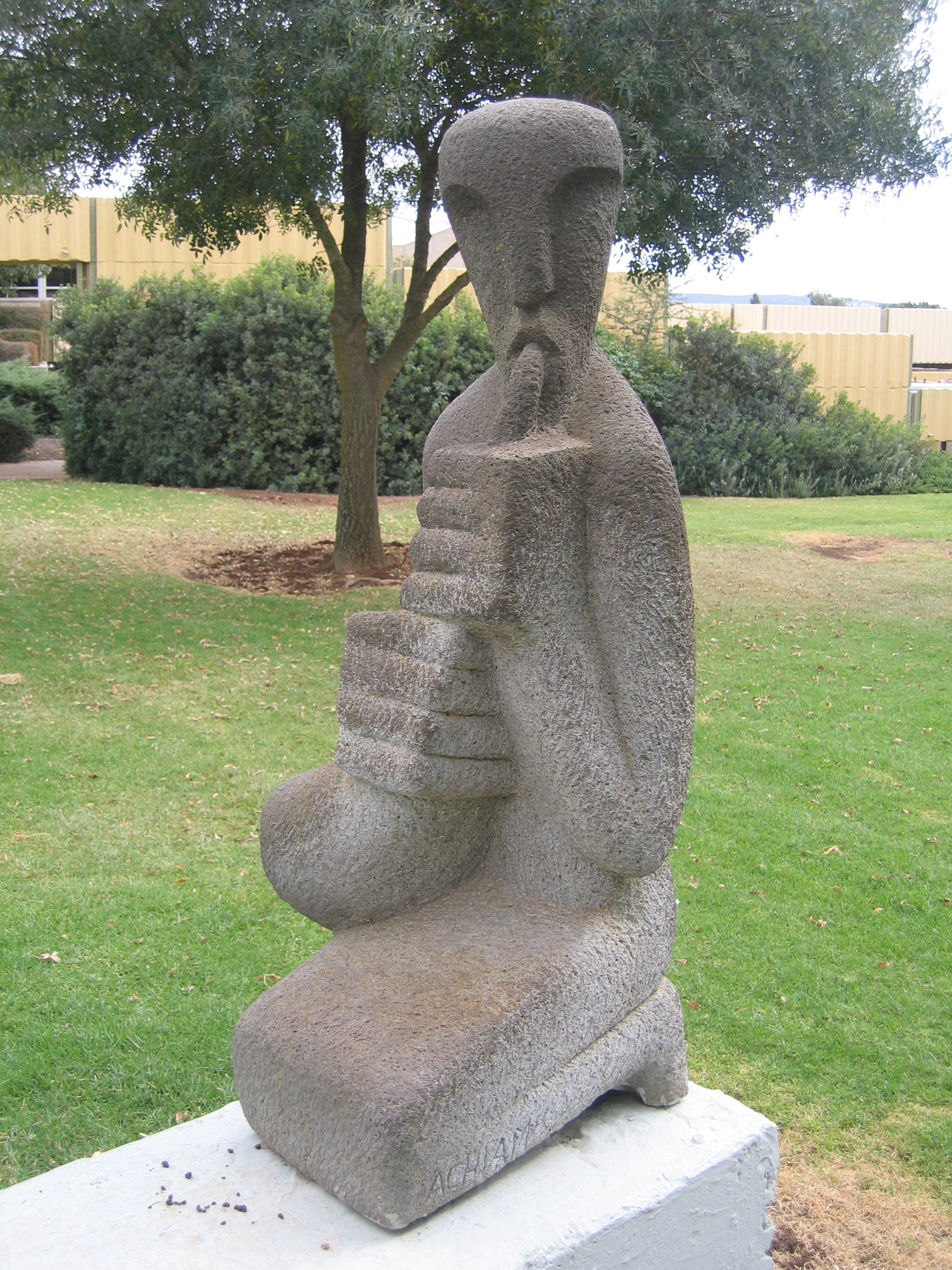
Horn player (Basalt) (1964) at the Open Museum of Tefen (Israel)

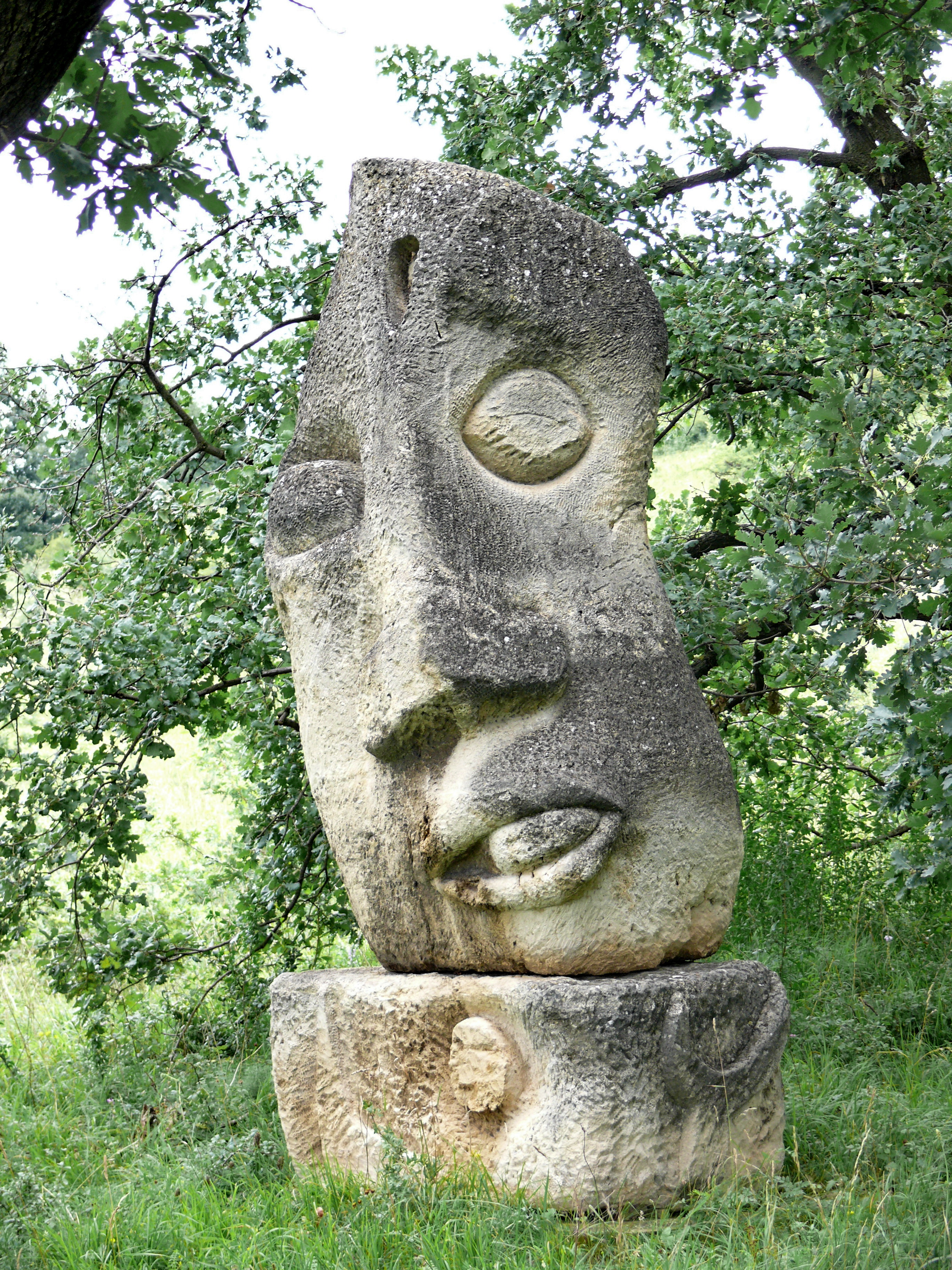
Goliath (Limestone)
1961, international sculpture symposium in St Margarethen (Austria)

== Museums and public collections ==
A museum is dedicated to Achiam in Israel in the old Roman thermal baths of Shuni (Jabotinsky Park) in Binyamina near Caesarea.

Many of his works are in the collections of the Museum of Modern Art and the National Museum of Modern Art in Paris.

The Open Museum of Tefen and the Lavon Sculpture Garden (Galilee, Israel) permanently exhibit about ten of his works; nearby are works of other 20th century Israeli artists, such as Itzhak Danziger and Shlomo Selinger.

After his death, the suburban region of Arc-de-Seine acquired about twenty of his works so as to place them in the five constituent towns. In the town of Ville-d'Avray, five of them, principally statues evoking music, have been installed in the castle park, near the Academy of Music. Not far away, the town of Sèvres exhibits five works, among them Rooster, Guitar Player, and Maternity.

Other institutions, like Gratz College in Philadelphia (USA), the Esterhazy Museum in Eisenstadt (Austria), and the Caisse des dépôts et consignations also possess some works of Achiam.

== Exhibitions ==
- 1948 Paris : René Drouin's gallery.
- 1953 Paris : René Breteau's gallery.
- 1957 Paris : Lara Vinci's gallery.
- 1965 Paris : Paul Ambroise' gallery.
- 1966 Philadelphia (USA) : Civic Center museum
- 1967 Paris : Paul Ambroise's gallery.
- 1969 Nancy (France) : Museum of Fine Arts of Nancy
- 1971 Lausanne (Switzerland) : Galerie l'Entracte.
- 1973 Amsterdam (Pays-bas) : Israel Galerie.
- 1976 Paris : Paul Ambroise' gallery.
- 1980 Haifa (Israel) : University museum
- 1980 Eisenstadt (Austria) : Schloss Esterházy
- 1984 Paris : Galerie Sculptures.
- 1986 Meudon (France) : Museum of Art and History.
- 1988 Tefen (District nord (Israel-Golan Heights) : Open museum.
- 1992 Meudon (France) : Museum of Art and History.
- 1991-1993 Tefen (District nord (Israël-Golan) - Israël) : Open museum.
- 1995 Les Andelys (France) : Nicolas Poussin's museum.
- 1996 Ville d'Avray (France) : Colombier Cultural Center.
- 1998 Trouville (France) : Galerie du Musée.
- 1998 Sèvres (France) : « Achiam in the city »
- 2001 Paris : Galerie Arcane.
- 2002 Ville d'Avray (France) : Galery Corot.
- 2004 Ville d'Avray (France) : Colombier Cultural Center.
- 2005 Volvic (France) : Musée Marcel Sahut.
- 2007 Aulnay-sous-Bois : exhibition on the theme of the bust line

Many works are exhibited in its sculpture garden in Sèvres. They can be seen at open houses that are regularly organized by the municipality.

== Bibliography ==
- Achiam (1979). Sculptures et poèmes (in French and English). Préface by André Flament. Paris: Éditions de l'Archipel. p. 110.
- Elliott, Patrick (1988). Sculpture en taille directe en France de 1900 à 1950. Préface by Pascale Grémont-Gervaise. Fondation de Coubertin. p. 110.
- Ionel Jianou, Achiam in Ionel Jianou; Gérard Xuriguera; Aube Lardera (1982). La sculpture moderne en France depuis 1950 (in French). Paris: Arted. ISBN 2-9506806-3-4.
- Kenan, Amos (1993). Achiam at Tefen (in English and Hebrew). Preface by Stef Wertheimer. Industrial parc - Tefen (Israel): The Open Museum.
- Achiam Sculpture Museum - Jabotinsky Parc, Shuni (in English and Hebrew). Keren Kayemeth LeIsraël. 2003. p. 118.
- Achiam, notice inDarmon, Adrian (2003). Autour de l'art juif (in French). Éditions Carnot. p. 264. ISBN 2-84855-011-2.

Extract on Google books

- Antony, Anne-Marie (2001). Achiam, sculpteur (in French). Publibook.
- "Achiam, une œuvre à cœur ouvert". Chaville magazine (in French). Chaville - France. October 2007. pp. 18–19. ISSN 1269-231X.

== Filmography ==
- Marianne Rigaud-Roy (1993). La voie d'Achiam (in French). La Fémis.
