= Masumi Hayashi =

Masumi Hayashi may refer to:

- Masumi Hayashi (photographer) (1945–2006), Japanese-American photographer
- Masumi Hayashi (murderer), convicted of killing four people with poisoned curry
