= Croatia–Slovenia relations =

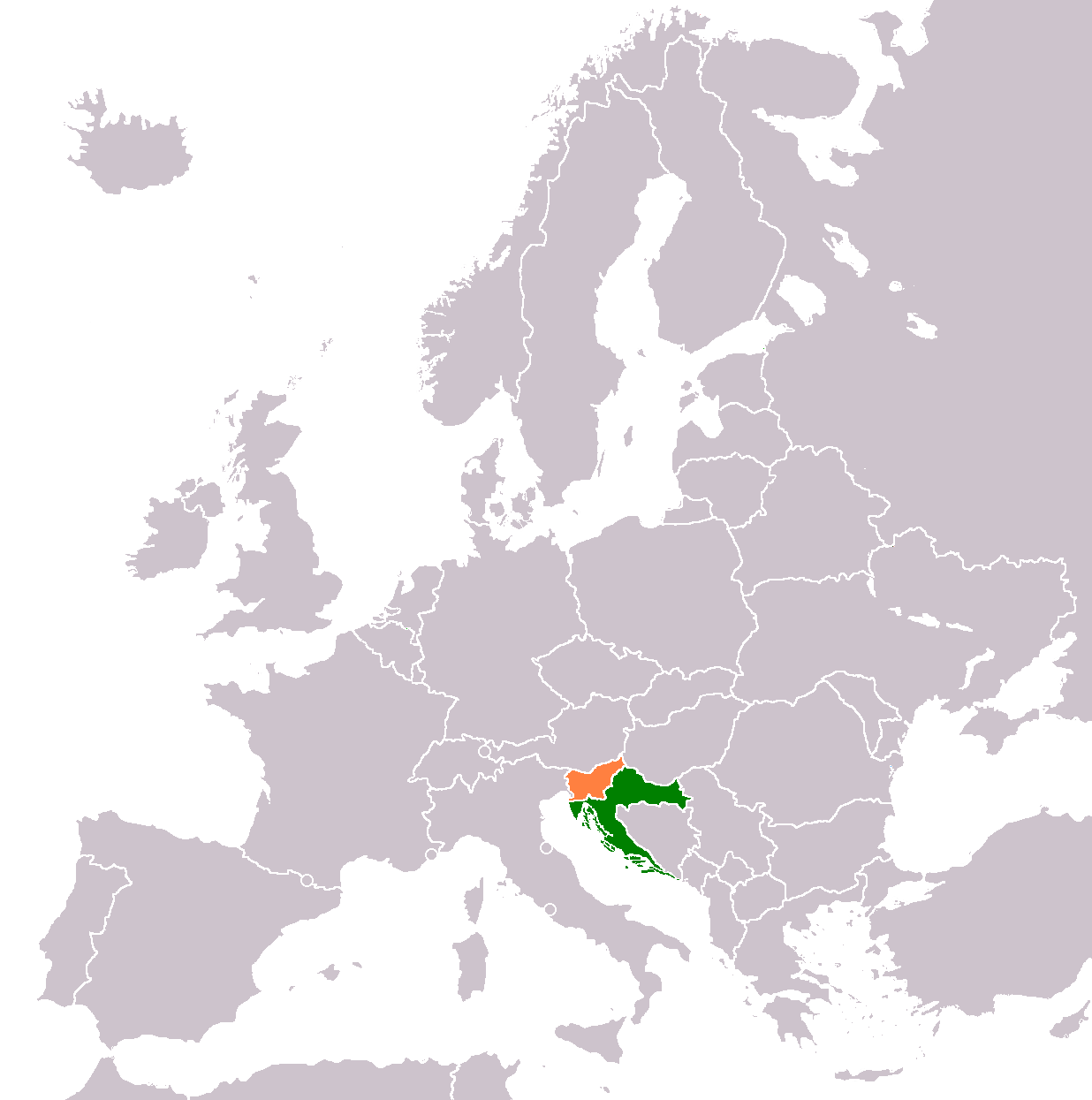

- Croatia: Slovenia

Diplomatic mission
- Embassy of Croatia, Ljubljana: Embassy of Slovenia, Zagreb

The foreign relations between Croatia and Slovenia are bound together by shared geopolitical and cultural history, ethnogenesis and ethnolinguistics, geography as well as shared modern political ideologies and geopolitical alignment. Both states established diplomatic relations in 1992, following the dissolution of Yugoslavia and the independence of Croatia. Modern relations are warm and friendly, with collaboration across a variety of initiatives. There are limited disputes over their border and sovereign rights over certain nuclear and economic assets. The countries share 670 km (420 mi) of common border. They are perennially each other's largest trading partners on an import-export basis.

As the two wealthiest former Yugoslav republics by GDP-per-capita, Slovenia and Croatia were the first two countries to achieve independence, with both later joining the European Union (EU) in 2004 and 2013, respectively. Both are close military allies, sharing membership in NATO as well as the EU defense forces. Croatia has an embassy in Ljubljana and two honorary consulates in Maribor and Koper. Slovenia has an embassy in Zagreb and an honorary consulate in Split.

== History ==
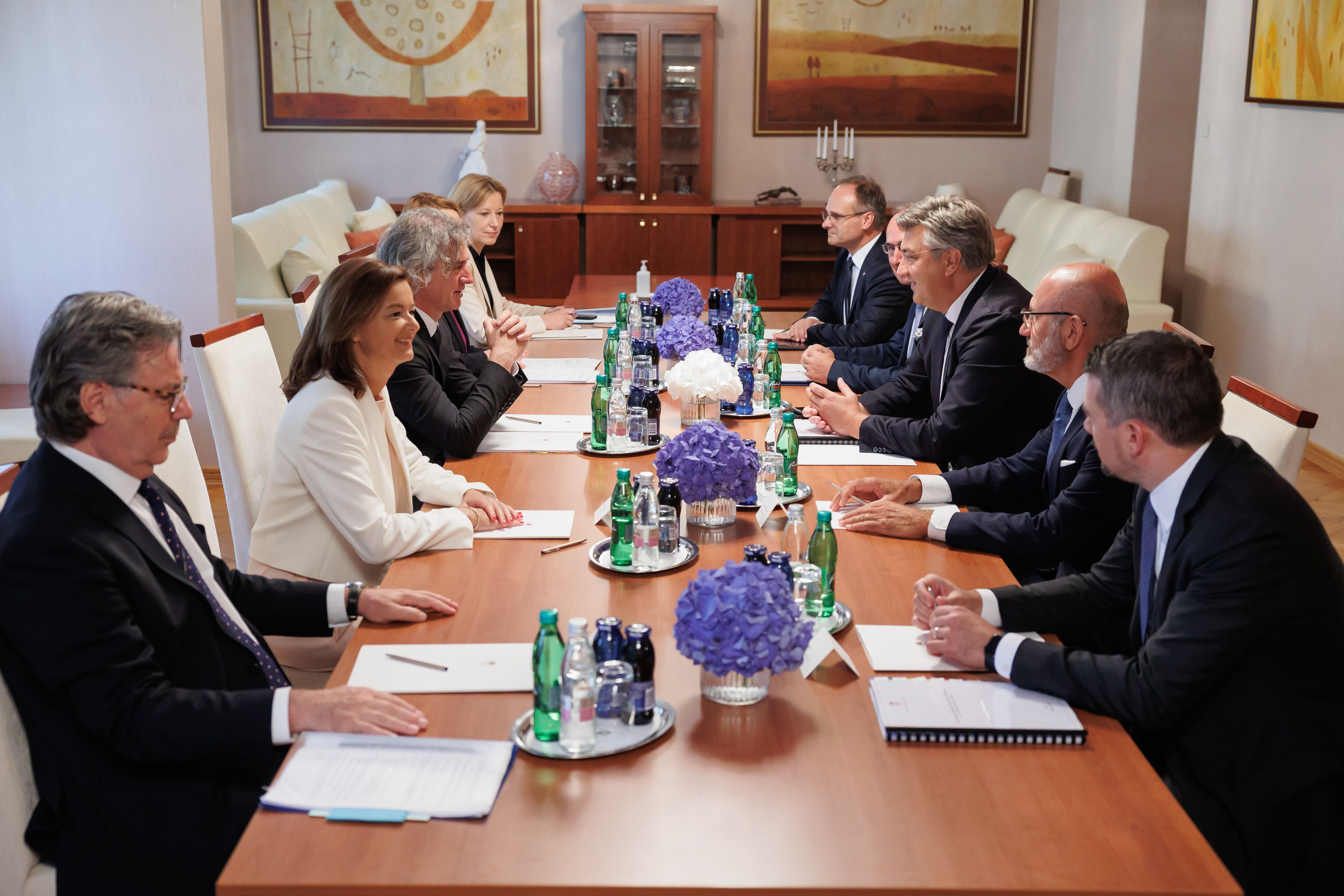
Prime Ministers Andrej Plenković and Robert Golob at the Bled Strategic Forum, 2022.

Before 1991, both countries were part of Yugoslavia. On June 26, 1991, a mutual recognition agreement was signed by both countries. Diplomatic relations between both countries were established on February 6, 1992. In a series of high-level meetings since the latter half of 1998, Slovenia and Croatia have been engaged in settling bilateral differences, a process which accelerated after the death of Croatian President Franjo Tuđman in 1999. In 2004, Slovenia joined the European Union, along with a handful of other countries. As Slovenia acceded to the European Union (EU) in 2004, it leveraged this position to blockade Croatia's candidacy in 2013 to join the EU in order to settle some of these disputes. The two states allowed the European Commission to successfully arbitrate which saw to Croatia's membership in the EU and NATO that year.

On 3 March 2013, Croatia and Slovenia reached an agreement on Ljubljanska banka. A month after that, the Parliament of Slovenia unanimously ratified the Croatian accession treaty. Croatia joined NATO in 2009. Slovenia joined NATO in 2004. Croatia joined the EU in 2013. Slovenia joined the EU in 2004.

== Issues of contention ==
=== Border disputes ===
The border disputes between the two states concern:

- the division of former Yugoslav territorial waters, particularly in the Gulf of Piran;
- the hamlets of Bužini, Mlini, Škodelini and Škrile located to the south of river Dragonja in Istria, which were administered by Croatia from 1954, after the river was re-routed, and which Slovenia claims as part of cadaster municipality Sečovlje;
- the Sveta Gera (Trdina Peak) in the Žumberak Mountains, with the Slovenian Army occupying barracks that according to the Croatian side lay partially in Croatian territory;
- the changing meanders of the river Mura, near Hotiza and Sveti Martin na Muri, where the situation in nature differs from the descriptions in official maps and documents.

Slovenia claims that the maritime border in Piran Bay does not go through the middle of the bay, while Croatia claims it does. This is causing problems for fishermen due to there being an undefined area where the naval police of each country may patrol. Related to the border in Piran Bay is Slovenian access to international waters in the form of a corridor which would require Croatia to cede its exclusive rights over at least some of its territorial waters to the west of Umag. The disputed Dragonja area is located near the Sečovlje-Plovanija official border crossing point, set up by an interim agreement of the two countries in the 1990s.

A referendum regarding the ratification of the agreement on the arbitration between Slovenia and Croatia regarding the Gulf of Piran border dispute was held in Slovenia in June 2010. Croatia and Slovenia agreed to let outside arbitrators come up with a plan to divide the Gulf in 2009 in the hopes of finding a resolution to the dispute and easing Croatia's entry to the Union. Though the parliaments in both Croatia and Slovenia ratified the agreement, the Slovene parliament additionally voted to require a public referendum on the deal. The agreement was supported by 51.54% of voters and opposed by 48.46% of voters. In October 2010, the Slovenian law on the ratification of the agreement was also unanimously recognized by the Slovenian Constitutional Court as being in accordance with the Constitution of Slovenia. The diplomatic notes about the agreement were exchanged between the Government of Slovenia and Government of Croatia on November 25, 2010. The agreement came into force on November 29, 2010.

=== Exclusive economic zone in the Adriatic Sea ===
A disputed issue with Croatia was Slovenian and Italian opposition to the proclamation of the Croatian Ecological and Fisheries Protection Zone (Exclusive Economic Zone) in the Adriatic Sea. Slovenia is disputing this, requiring direct access to the international waters. This policy has been in place since late 2004 but excludes the EU countries (namely, Slovenia and Italy).

In the negotiations with the European Union, it was decided that Croatia can proclaim an ecological protection zone for third countries, but not also for the countries of the European Union. About 40% of all the catchment of Slovenian fishermen originates from the zone.

=== Ljubljana Bank ===
Another open issue is the financial compensation for the Croatian depositors who lost their savings in the liquidation of the Slovenian-based Yugoslav bank Ljubljanska banka. During SFRY, the said bank had a branch in Zagreb. In December 1991, Croatian authorities allowed the transfer of two thirds of the foreign-currency debt of the Zagreb branch of Ljubljana Bank to a number of Croatian banks. Some 132,000 clients kept their savings in Ljubljana bank. By 1994, the Slovenian Parliament formed Nova Ljubljanska Banka with the old bank's assets but none of its debts. In 1995, the Croatian bank Privredna banka Zagreb filed a lawsuit against Ljubljana Bank, after the Croatian Ministry of Finance authorized it to do so. In 1997 the Slovenian parliament halted all lawsuits against Ljubljana Bank by foreign citizens. In 2001, the Ministry of Finance extended the lawsuit authorization to Zagrebačka banka. The two countries signed the 2001 Agreement on Succession Issues, dealing with the succession negotiations after the break-up of Yugoslavia. In 2002, succession negotiations were hosted by the Bank of International Settlements in Basel, but Croatia and Bosnia and Herzegovina rejected the proposed model in which they would have to reimburse the depositors. The negotiations stalled after that.

In 2010, after the Kosor–Pahor agreement, the Croatian side had reportedly agreed to the Slovenian position, which was a precondition for Croatia to close the negotiations with the EU regarding Chapter 4 of the Acquis on the free movement of capital. The Slovenian position has been that the compensation is a succession issue. Slovenia also made it their condition for the acceptance of Croatia to the European Union, most recently in July and September 2012. In April 2012 Croatia passed a conclusion according to which this is only a dispute between the bank and its Croatian savers and should be resolved in courts. The European Commission considers this to be a bilateral issue.

On 6 November 2012, the European Court of Human Rights delivered a first-degree verdict in the case of Ališić and Others v. Bosnia and Herzegovina, Croatia, Serbia, Slovenia and the “Former Yugoslav Republic of Macedonia”, finding Slovenia in violation of the European Convention on Human Rights and ordering it to compensate "the applicants and all others in their position" (individual Ljubljana Bank savers). In Croatia, some interpreted this as a precedent for the diplomatic issue, but Slovenian Foreign Minister Erjavec released a statement saying this is a separate issue from the diplomatic issue, rather that the latter was about "transferred debt".

On February 7, 2013, Croatian and Slovenian Foreign Ministers said they had solved the problem of the former Ljubljana Bank, which was threatening to impede Croatia's EU accession in July.

=== Krško Nuclear Power Plant ===
The two countries' national power companies jointly manage the Krško Nuclear Power Plant. They have had various issues, particularly between 1997 and 2001.

== International organizations ==
Croatia joined the European Union (EU) in 2013. Slovenia joined the European Union (EU) in 2004. Croatia joined NATO in 2009. Slovenia joined NATO in 2004.

== Embassies ==
Republic of Croatia

- Ljubljana (Embassy)

Republic of Slovenia

- Zagreb (Embassy)

== See also ==
- Foreign relations of Croatia
- Foreign relations of Slovenia
- Croatia–Slovenia border disputes
- Croats of Slovenia
- Slovenes of Croatia
- Serbia–Slovenia relations
