= Referendum Bill 2010 =

There have been several referendum bills proposed in 2010:

- Scottish Referendum Bill, 2010, draft bill, later passed in 2013
- 2011 United Kingdom Alternative Vote referendum, draft bill, later passed in 2011
- 2010 Icelandic Icesave referendum's bill (8 January 2010)
- 2010 Slovenian border dispute agreement referendum's bill (26 April 2010)
- 2010 Turkish constitutional referendum's bill (7 May 2010)
