= Croatia–Slovenia border disputes =

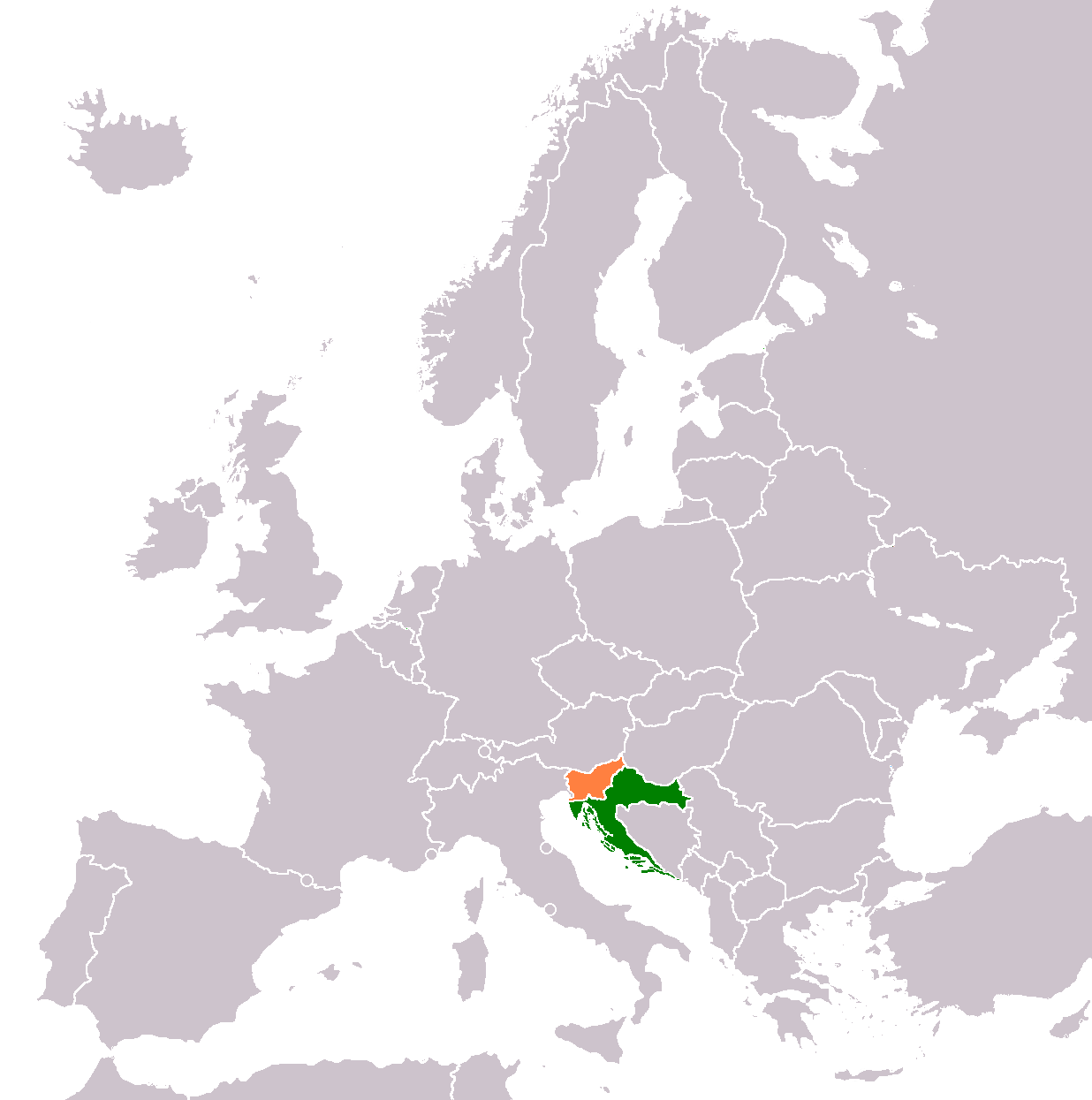
Location of Croatia (green) and Slovenia (orange)

Following the breakup of Yugoslavia in 1991, Slovenia and Croatia became independent countries. As the border between the countries had not been determined in detail prior to independence, several parts of the border were disputed, both on land and at the sea, namely in the Gulf of Piran.

According to the Croatian Bureau of Statistics, the two countries share about 668 kilometres (415 mi) of border. According to the Statistical Office of the Republic of Slovenia, the border spans 670 km (416 mi). The border mostly runs along a southwest-northeast axis.

The countries have attempted to resolve the dispute, most notably with the Drnovšek–Račan agreement in 2001 that was ratified by Slovenia but not by Croatia. Because of the disputed border, Slovenia blocked Croatia's EU accession talks until the agreement was reached by both countries and the EU to settle the dispute by a binding arbitration.

On 29 June 2017, the Permanent Court of Arbitration issued a binding ruling on the border, ruling on the disputed parts of land border, drawing the border in the Gulf of Piran, and ruling that Slovenia should have direct access to international waters in the north Adriatic Sea using a corridor crossing Croatian waters. It also ruled on several other disputed border areas. The ruling was hailed by Slovenia but Croatia said it would not implement it. Croatia stated that they withdrew from the process in 2015, citing the discovered talks between the Slovenian government representative and the member of the arbitration court as a breach of the arbitration rules. Slovenia implemented the ruling on 29 December 2017 with continued opposition from Croatia.

== Origins of Gulf of Piran issues ==
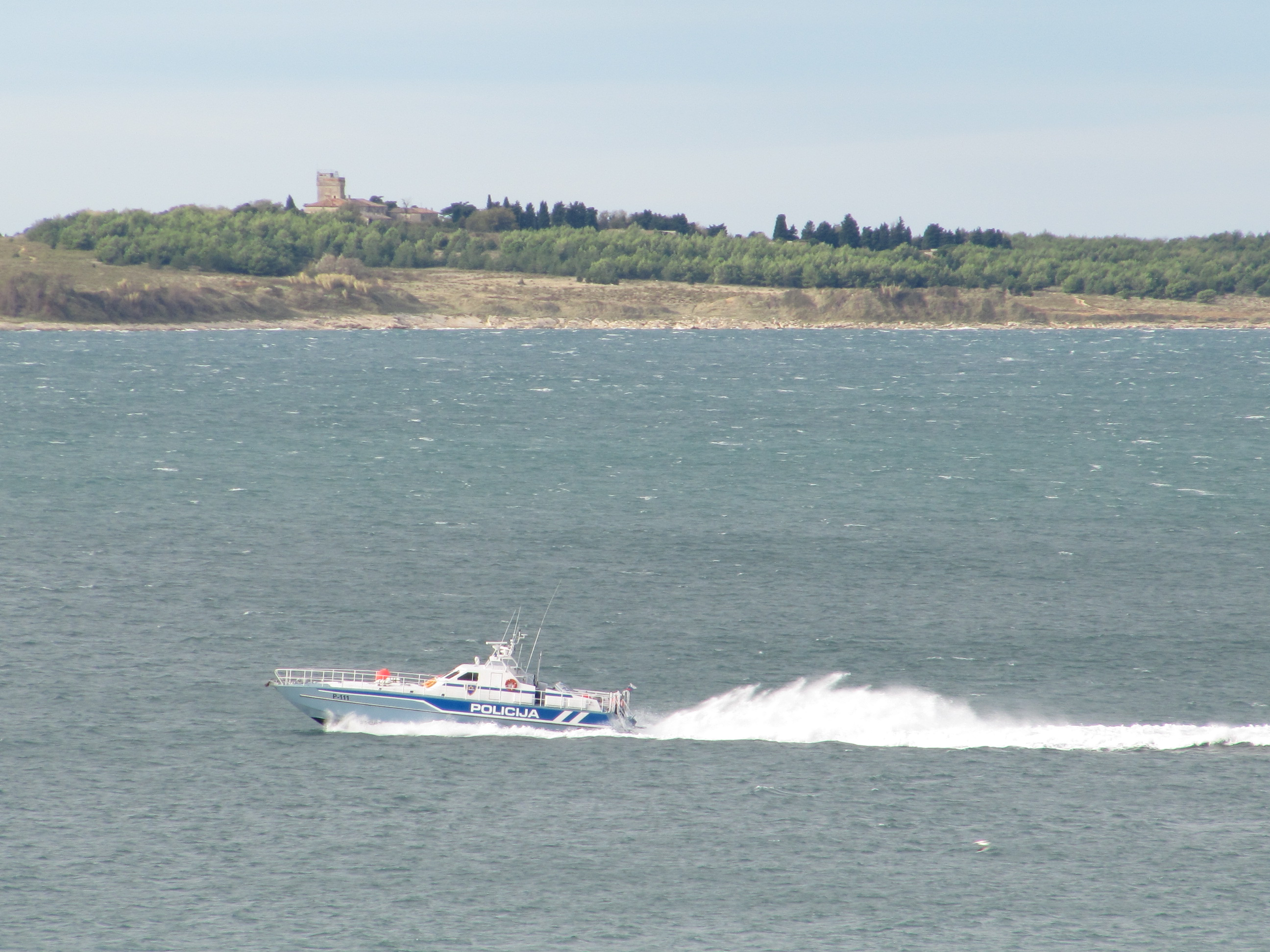
Slovenian police/coast guard boat P111 in the Gulf of Piran

Following World War II, the area from north of Trieste to the Mirna River in the south was part of the Free Territory of Trieste. In 1954, the Territory was dissolved; the area was provisionally divided between Italy and Yugoslavia, and the division made final by the Treaty of Osimo in 1975.

In the first draft delimitation proposal following both countries' 1991 declarations of independence, Slovenia proposed establishing the border in the Gulf of Piran's center. However, Slovenia changed the draft the following year (declaring its sovereignty over the entire Gulf on 5 June 1992). Since then Slovenia has continued to insist on this position.

The name "Bay of Savudrija" (Croatian: Savudrijska vala) was originally used for only part of the bay. In 2000 it came into use for the whole bay by local Croatian fishermen and was quickly adopted (first by Croatian journalists, then local authorities, and finally at the state level), leading to its appearance in official maps. Such actions were contrary to established practices with long-standing geographical names, and are seen by Slovene authorities as an attempt to imply historical connections with the bay. Another name, "Bay of Dragonja" (Croatian: Dragonjski zaljev), was introduced in Croatia but failed to gain widespread use.

== Sea dispute ==
Croatia claims that the boundary should be an equal distance from each shore. The claim is based on the first sentence of Article 15 of the United Nations Convention on the Law of the Sea:

Article 15: 'Where the coasts of two States are opposite or adjacent to each other, neither of the two States is entitled, failing agreement between them to the contrary, to extend its territorial sea beyond the median line every point of which is equidistant from the nearest points on the baselines from which the breadth of the territorial seas of each of the two States is measured. The above provision does not apply, however, where it is necessary by reason of historic title or other special circumstances to delimit the territorial seas of the two States in a way which is at variance therewith.'

—

Slovenian claims are based on the same article. However, it favours the second sentence, which stipulates that historical claims or other unusual circumstances supersede the equidistance rule. The Law of the Sea also states that international waters begin 12 nautical miles (22 km; 14 mi) from the country's shore – while the nearest international waters are 15.5 nautical miles (28.7 km; 17.8 mi) away from Slovenia's shore.

The Convention states that a coastal state has an exclusive right to manage all natural resources in a band up to 200 nautical miles (370 km; 230 mi) from its shore (an 'exclusive economic zone').

When Slovenia notified the UN Secretariat in 1995 of its succession to Yugoslavia's ratification of the Convention (continuing the agreement), it included a note saying that this system of exclusive economic zones has become part of international law and asserted its rights as a geographically disadvantaged state. The convention makes it clear that any decision to declare an exclusive economic zone should be made in co-operation with all interested parties; Croatian sources claim that Slovenia's self-description as a geographically disadvantaged state amounts to an admission that it is a country without access to international waters.

Slovenia also claims the right to access international waters; Slovenia bases this claim on the country's free access to international waters while part of Yugoslavia. Due to the statements of Croatian negotiators, Slovenian politicians have also presented the concern that without a territorial connection to international waters, Croatia could limit "harmless passage" to its ports (contrary to international agreements and practice); this would complicate Slovenia's sovereignty at sea and could cause economic damage. Because of these concerns, Slovenia has invoked the principle of equity for unfortunate geographic conditions.

According to Slovenia, Savudrija was associated with Piran, which for centuries had an Italian majority until post-World War II, and Slovenian police controlled the entire gulf between 1954 and 1991. If this claim were to prevail, Slovenia argues it could claim sovereignty over part of the bay area on the Croatian side of the median line. Croatia disputes Slovenia's claims of historical control over the bay.

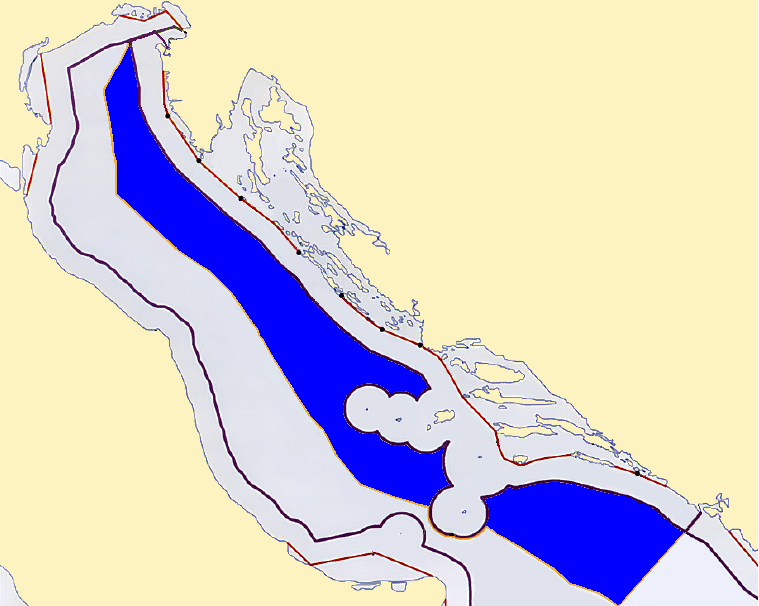
Area of the proclaimed Croatian Ecological and Fisheries Protection Zone (ZERP) in the Adriatic Sea, including territorial waters

The Croatian side asserts that the corridor in the Croatian waters would be useless for traffic, since traffic regulations in the Gulf of Trieste allow only incoming traffic on the Croatian side of the border, while outgoing traffic must go through Italian waters. The Slovenian response is that Slovenia's access to international waters is not an exclusively practical or commercial issue; it is rather the logical consequence of that Slovenia is said to be an internationally recognized maritime country with granted access to international seas. The latter assertion has been repeatedly disputed by the Croatian side.

Croatia wants to solve this dispute only by certain articles of international law, while the Slovenian side insists on consideration of the principle "ex aequo et bono". The disputed points between the countries include whether or not the legal principle "ex aequo et bono" is a part of international law. Article 38(2) of the Statute of the International Court of Justice provides that the court may decide cases ex aequo et bono only if the parties agree. In 1984, the ICJ decided a case between the U.S. and Canada using "equitable criteria".

According to the Wikileaks cables published in 2011, which contain assessments by American diplomats, the maritime border dispute was influenced by Slovenia considering itself a maritime nation and Croatia feeling inferior to its neighbours.

== Land dispute along the Dragonja river ==
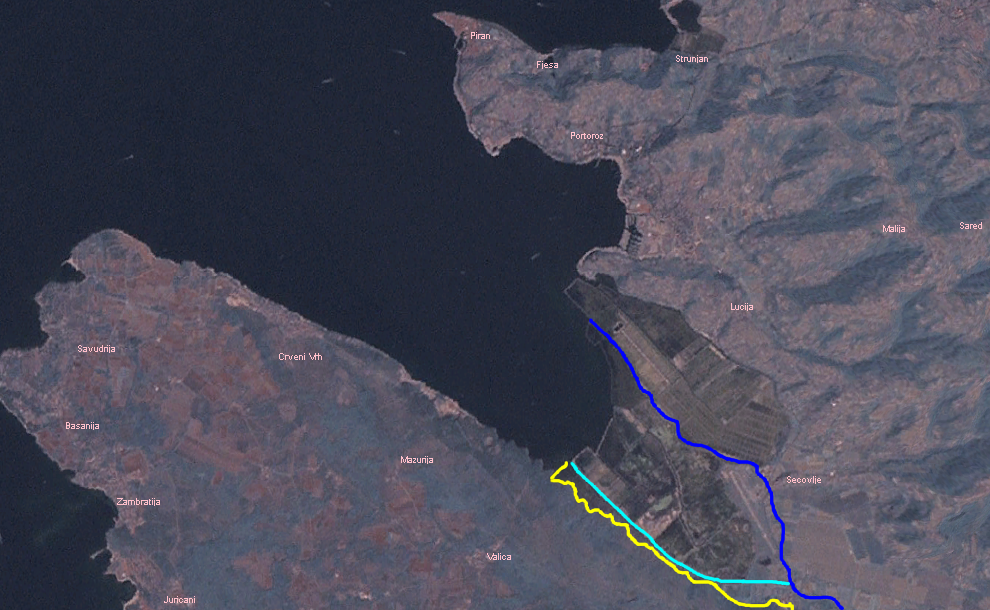
Border dispute in the Gulf of Piran. Dragonja's original flow The artificial canal of St. Odoric Slovenian claimed border

Along with the maritime dispute, the two countries also have a land border dispute in the Gulf area along the Dragonja River. As in other disputed border areas, the dispute stems from differing demarcation principles: while the border between two republics was often drawn based on (sometimes loose) political agreements or along natural landforms, cadastral records from villages along the border continued to refer to the land which ended up controlled by the other republic. In the delta of Dragonja, Slovenia claims that the border is south of the river (thus including all the land that is registered in the cadastral municipality of Sečovlje), while Croatia claims that the border is on the river itself (St. Odoric's canal). The Croatian side rejects Slovenian arguments for cadastral borders on just this part of the mutual border (where such are in favour of Slovenia), saying that if the cadastral principle was consistently implemented, Slovenia would lose much more territory elsewhere than it could receive in the Gulf of Piran.

Another source of conflict in this area has been the border crossing at Plovanija, due to a checkpoint unilaterally established by Croatia on territory that has been claimed by both sides. Despite stating that the border crossing checkpoint is only a temporary solution, Croatia has included this checkpoint as indisputable in its international documents. Consequently, the territories with a Slovenian population south of that border checkpoint are considered to be under Croatian occupation by a number of Slovenian politicians and legal experts.

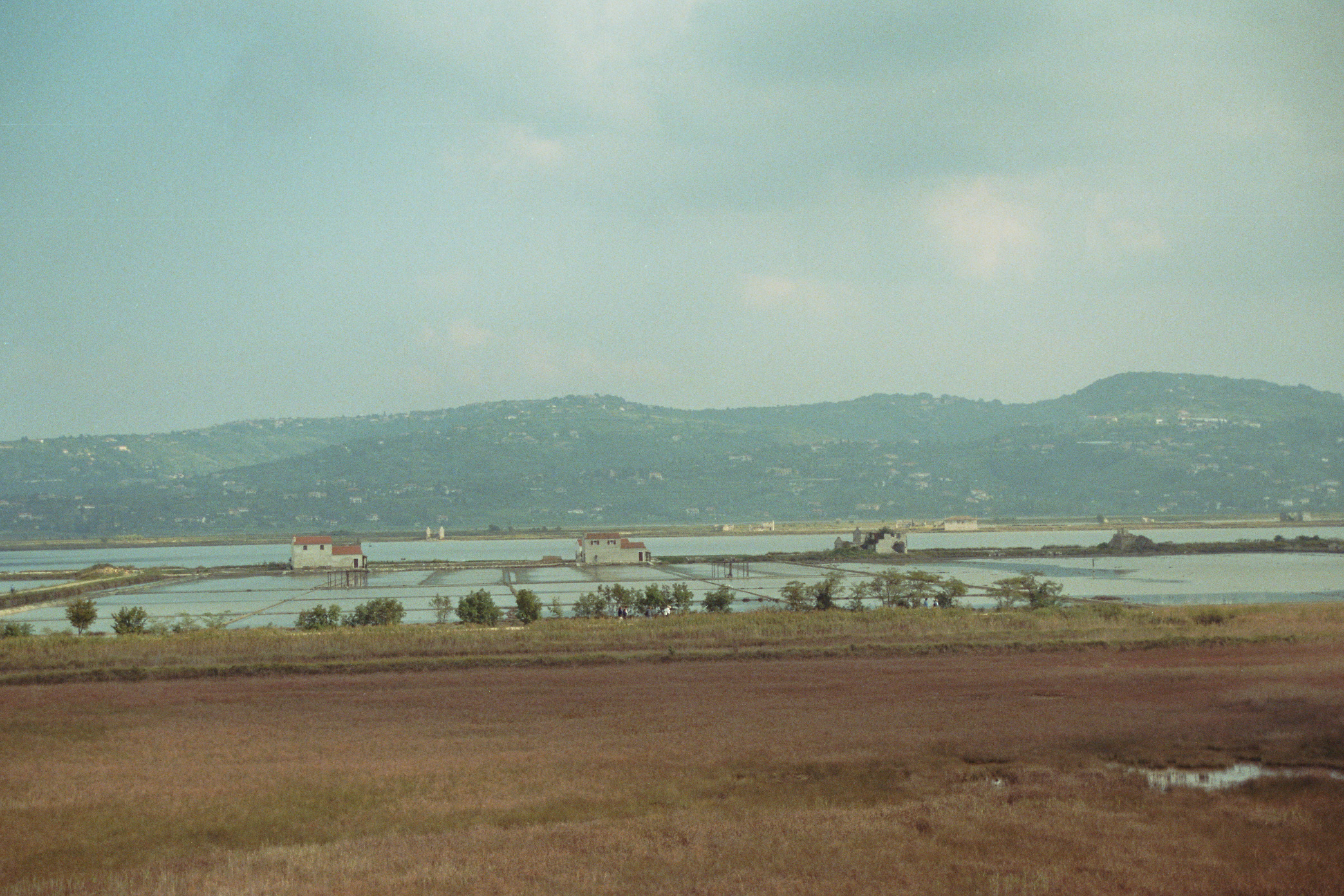
Old part of the Sečovlje salt pans; picture taken from the Bay of Piran's Croatian coast

Both countries claim to have exercised since 1954 the most administrative jurisdiction over the contested area on the left bank of the river. The strip's inhabitants were granted Slovenian citizenship in 1991 and the Slovenian judiciary considers the area an integral part of Slovenia.

Among the Slovenian citizens residing in the area on the left bank of the Dragonja river is Joško Joras, whose refusal to recognize any Croatian jurisdiction after the two countries' independence has led since the early 1990s to a number of conflicts between Slovenia and Croatia. Joras claims he is on Slovenian territory occupied by Croatia; this has garnered much local public, but not much international, attention.

According to some Croatian experts, the border between the countries should be a few miles north from the current Dragonja river course, on what they regard as the original river course. The current river flow is actually a man-made canal, known as the Canal of St. Odoric. They point out a 1944 meeting organized by the Partisan Scientific Institute, led by the Slovenian historian Fran Zwitter, at which Slovenian and Croatian officials agreed on the Dragonja river as the border between the Socialist Republics of Croatia and Slovenia. However, neither the Slovenian nor the Croatian parliament ever ratified the agreement, nor was it ever internationally recognized. Moreover, according to some Slovenian legal experts such as Pavel Zupančič, the last internationally recognized border between the two countries was on the river Mirna (south of the Dragonja). However, the proposed Dragonja border has also been referenced multiple times and even partially implemented. The Croatian argument is, accordingly, based exclusively on the Dragonja border proposal which Slovenia has never officially recognized. According to the Croatian view, the current main flow of the Dragonja (the Canal of St. Odoric) was man made; according to Dr. Ekl, while international law allows changes of river-defined borders when rivers are changed by nature, it does not allow man-made river changes to alter borders. However, this is not the Croatian government's official position.

The analogous Slovenian argument claims that Piran has historically included the cadastral municipalities of Savudrija and Kaštel, which constitute the northern part of Savudrija Cape. The division of prewar Piran is therefore considered legally void, since any changes of borders should be (according to the former Yugoslav constitution) accepted by either the (no longer extant) federal parliament or the former Yugoslav republics' parliaments. Also support for the Slovenian claim to the Savudrija Cape comes from the area's ethnic structure, including Kaštel and Savudrija. In 1880 Kaštel, for instance, 99.31% of the population spoke Slovene. In 1910, the percent of Slovene-speaking inhabitants fell to 29.08%, the rest of population being predominantly Italian-speaking (65.22%), with only 5.70% Croatian-speaking. Similarly, in Savudrija, in 1910, the percent of Slovene-speaking population was 14.01%, while the majority was Italian speaking (78.77%). Thus, in 1910 Slovene were the largest non-Italian minority population in Kaštel and Savudrija. On that basis, some claim that the border between the countries should be changed and established at the southern border of the cadastral municipalities of Kaštel and Savudrija, at the Savudrija Cape's middle; since Croatia claims these municipalities, the border should not be further south than this. This position has been supported by a few notable Slovenian politicians, such as Marjan Podobnik and his political/party colleagues.

Another Slovenian view advocating border changes was proposed by the first President of the Slovenian Parliament, the legal expert France Bučar. The Istrian peninsula was historically included in the Austro-Hungarian Empire's Austrian part, as was the territory of modern Slovenia; the majority of modern Croatian territory was included in the Hungarian part. Bučar asserted that the present Istrian peninsular division is thus legally unfounded and irrelevant, since this division has never been based on what he considers proper legal acts and especially not on the will of Istria's native population. Therefore, Bučar proposed that the border in Istria should be determined by referendums carried out in any territory both countries wish to claim. This proposal is, according to Bučar, based upon the legal principle of self-determination, the same principle on which both countries' 1991 Declarations of Independence were based. Such a border determination process was employed in the Carinthian Plebiscite to determine the Slovenian–Austrian border.

== Land dispute on Sveta Gera/Trdinov vrh ==
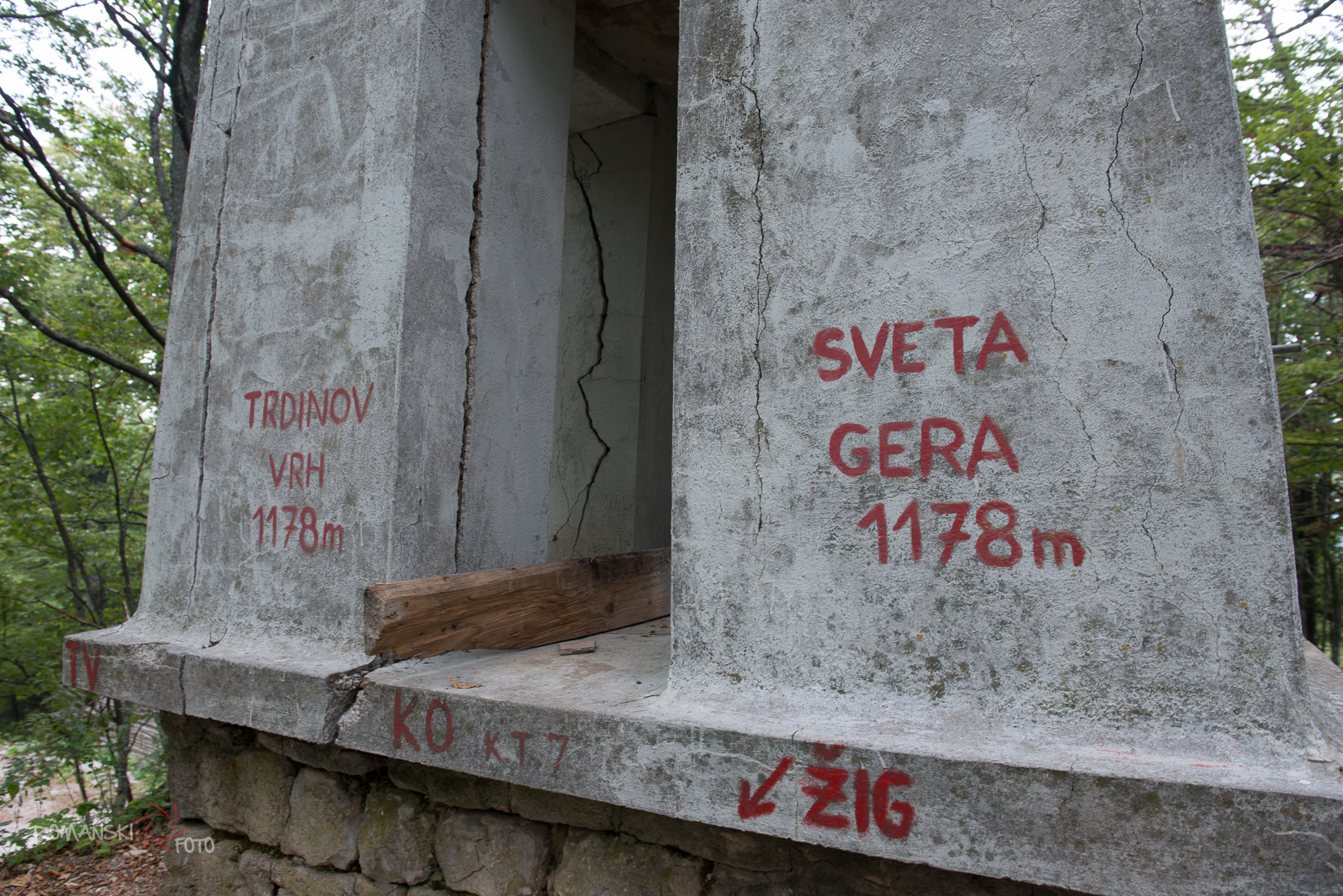
Both mountain names on top

Sveta Gera (Slovene: Trdinov vrh), the Žumberak/Gorjanci mountain range's highest peak, was disputed in the 1990s, but as of 2011 the issue is dormant.

The summit is claimed by both Croatia and Slovenia and is recorded in the Croatian land registry. An old Yugoslav People's Army barracks building stands there that is used as an outpost by the Slovenian Army. Control over the military complex is another part of the dispute. Diplomacy has kept this dispute from escalating.

In March 1999, Milan Kučan (president of Slovenia at the time) characterized the barracks building's use by either the Slovenian or the Croatian Army as controversial and "at least uncivilized". In 2004, he argued on Croatian TV that it would be better to open a mountain lodge there.

== Border demarcation along the Mura River ==
Međimurje County map

Međimurje, the northernmost county of Croatia, borders Prekmurje, the easternmost region of Slovenia. The Mura River has divided Prekmurje from Međimurje for centuries. The two regions were part of the Kingdom of Hungary, however latter was claimed by the Kingdom of Croatia and the Independent State of Croatia. The two regions became part of Slovenia and Croatia, respectively, in 1945.

An unresolved matter has been the March 1947 massacre of civilians by UDBA in the village of Štrigova. The Slovenes claim this was an incident of ethnic cleansing perpetrated by Croats to make the village Croatian.

The border between SR Slovenia and SR Croatia became the international border after the two countries became independent, pursuant to the decisions of the Badinter Committee.

In the border area, the river Mura meanders, occasionally floods, and has over time naturally modified its course.

The border, however, has customarily remained as previously determined; thus, the border today does not strictly follow the present-day river's course. Slovenia has proposed that the border follow the present-day river, but Croatia has rejected this.

Diplomacy has kept this dispute from escalating.

Since 2008, local farmers – (such as from the northern Međimurje towns of Štrigova, Sveti Martin na Muri, Mursko Središće and Podturen) – had to reach their properties (fields, meadows or woods) on the river's other side by crossing the strict Schengen border checkpoints. This was later resolved with Croatia being included within the Schengen borders, while the Schengen border moved to the border with Bosnia and Herzegovina.

== Attempts at dispute resolution ==
=== Drnovšek–Račan agreement ===
The maritime borders in the Bay of Piran, according to the Drnovšek–Račan agreement, would grant the disputed area to Slovenia and provide a corridor to international waters.

On 20 July 2001, the prime ministers of Slovenia and Croatia, Janez Drnovšek and Ivica Račan, made the Drnovšek–Račan agreement, which defined the entire border between the countries, including the maritime border. According to this agreement, Croatia would receive approximately one third of the gulf and a maritime border with Italy, while Slovenia would receive a corridor to international waters.

This solution included a Croatian "maritime exclave" between Italian and Slovenian waters. However, there are interpretations that such a solution breaks the Convention on the Territorial Sea and Contiguous Zone, which prohibits sovereignty over parts of the sea unconnected to land. Article 4 states, "... the sea areas lying within the lines must be sufficiently closely linked to the land domain to be subject to the regime of internal waters," and "... baselines may not be applied by a State in such a manner as to cut off from the high seas the territorial sea of another State."

In the Drnovšek–Račan agreement, the border strip on the Dragonja's left bank was recognized as part of Croatia.

The Parliament of Slovenia ratified this agreement. The Croatian parliament, however, never voted on the agreement's ratification, criticizing Račan for unilaterally simply giving all the disputed area to Slovenia, and insisting that the border dispute should be settled in the International Tribunal of Justice at the Hague.

=== Bled agreement ===
In 2007, the prime ministers Sanader and Janša achieved an unbinding agreement in principle to solve the border problem using the International Court of Justice in the Hague. According to the Slovenian proposal, both sides could dispute any part of the border and ask for it to be redrawn in court. Analogously to the Drnovšek–Račan agreement and Croatian politicians, the Bled agreement did not receive much support from most Slovenian politicians. Croatia, however, has kept insisting on the Bled agreement. Slovenia never officially informed Croatia of abandoning the agreement; a Slovene–Croatian working group continued to work for a year and a half on the matter.

== EU accession blockade ==
=== EU blockade background ===
Zmago Jelinčič, leader of the right-wing Slovene National Party (SNS), has reportedly stated that Slovenia should block Croatia's EU accession until the matter is resolved. Former Slovenian Foreign Minister Dimitrij Rupel and Minister of Finance Dušan Mramor stated in 2003 that they would stop supporting Croatian efforts to join the EU, together with Romania and Bulgaria. These two countries joined the EU while Croatia's negotiations were stalled by the EU's accusations that it was unwilling to apprehend Ante Gotovina on its territory and deliver him to the Hague on war crimes charges; Gotovina was actually located and captured in Spain. However, former Slovenian president Janez Drnovšek stated that Slovenia should act in the "European spirit" and carefully respond to any problems with Croatia.

On 23 September 2004 Slovenia threatened to veto Croatia's EU accession after Croatian border police detained 12 Slovenes, among them Janez Podobnik (leader of the opposition Slovenian People's Party (SPP)), after they refused to show their identification at the Sečovlje crossing point. The activists stated they were visiting Joras, who lives on the narrow strip of disputed land and claims it to be a part of Slovenia. After an emergency meeting, Slovenia's then Prime Minister Anton Rop declared that Croatia was not fit to join the EU.

Marjan Podobnik, head of the "Institute 25 June" (Slovene: Zavod 25. junij) (an organization that "preserves the national heritage") and the president of the Slovenian National Alliance in the SPP, published a new map in May 2007 in which the borders of Slovenia go deeply into current Croatian territory and the whole Piran Bay belongs to Slovenia. Podobnik, also known for his suggestions to hold a referendum in Slovenia on whether Croatia should enter the EU, stated for Globus magazine that "the map is logical because on the day of 25 June 1991 Slovenia had possession over the whole Piran Bay and unlimited access to international waters". Croatia's president Stipe Mesić stated: "Our friends in Slovenia can draw whatever maps they want, as part of Slovenia they can even encompass Helsinki and Reykjavík, that's of no interest to me".

In August 2007, the Croatian proposal for solving the disputed border issues before the International Tribunal for the Law of the Sea in Hamburg was rejected by Slovenia's Minister of Foreign Affairs Dimitrij Rupel. Croatia has also suggested arbitration on other disputes with Slovenia, such as a dispute over penalties for an electricity cutoff for Croatia from a jointly-managed nuclear power plant.

Before December 2008, Slovenia had rejected claims that it was responsible for blocking Croatia's EU accession, stating that the process's slowness was "because [Zagreb] has difficulties meeting the standards of the organization it wants to join".

=== Description of the blockade ===
Croatia included in documents presented in its process of negotiation for joining the EU their border proposal, without clearly demarcating the disputed status of parts of the borderline; this was perceived by Slovenia as prejudicing the ultimate borderline outcome. Therefore, Slovenia blocked Croatia's negotiation chapters for its EU membership that included the controversial documents.

Slovenia's Prime Minister Borut Pahor stated at the time that documents – notably maps – that Croatia had provided as part of its candidacy for accession could prejudice a resolution of the two countries' long-running border dispute. The blockade was strongly criticized by Croatian officials. Politicians from both states accused each other of trying to steal a part of their territory. Croatia suggested a border arbitration by a third party, while the Slovenian government suggested that the dispute be resolved through a special Croatian–Slovene commission.

In December 2008, Croatian Prime Minister Ivo Sanader and Montenegrin Prime Minister Milo Đukanović agreed that their own border dispute regarding Boka Kotorska would be settled in the International Court of Justice in the Hague, with both countries respecting the arbitration decision. The same was proposed to the Slovenian government, but Pahor refused. In September 2009, after Jadranka Kosor became Croatia's Prime Minister, she reached an agreement with Pahor, who subsequently announced an end to the 10-month blockade.

=== Blockade of negotiations in December 2008 ===
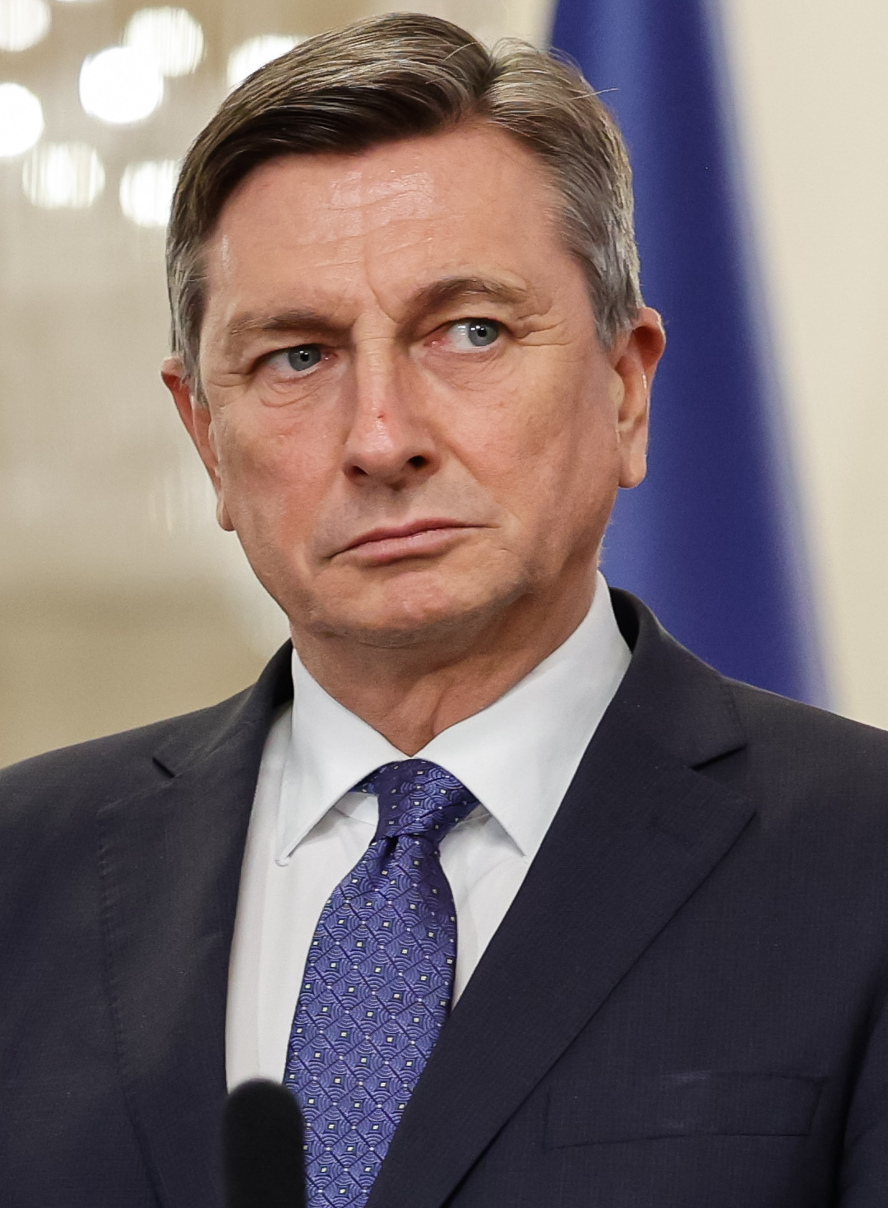
Borut Pahor, Slovenia's former Prime Minister and later President

Although previously Slovenia had sporadically slowed down the opening of new chapters between Croatia and the EU due to the border dispute, the new Prime Minister Borut Pahor immediately announced a total blockade when he came to power, accusing Croatia of prejudging the border in its border descriptions in the negotiation chapter with the EU. France, then the head of the EU presidency, moved to prevent a possible blockade. On 21 November 2008, Pahor gave a speech declaring that for the "last 14 days we have been in lively contact with the French EU presidency and are thankful for taking into consideration of our objections, so that the issue can be resolved on the adequate way".

Pahor stated that Slovenia supports Croatia joining the EU, but that he expects understanding from the EU for Slovenia's reservations due to the unresolved border issue. The Croatian government responded that it just gave maps to the EU for the negotiation process, which simply show the border based on the 1991 former Yugoslav republics' borders. Pahor stated that he will "study the French suggestion for a compromise, but only under the condition that the documents which were prepared by Croatia for the accession negotiations don't prejudge the state border and that both the European Commission and the Council of EU understand that stance".

Croatia's EU accession was thus set back by the following (7 December 2008) meeting of the 27 EU ministers of foreign affairs in Brussels. The ministers did not confirm the suggestion by the European Commission (EC) that Croatia's EU accession negotiations end by 2009; this was because of Slovenia's threat of a veto if the border dispute with Croatia was not resolved. As a consequence, the ministers did not record a conclusion date for the EU–Croatia negotiations. Croatia had initially hoped to join by 2010 or 2011. Italian foreign minister Pasquale Ferrara stated that "Member states, understandingly, do not want another border row inside the EU", concluding that one revolving around Cyprus is already enough. Following a discussion with the EC, Pahor said, "Zagreb should accept the negotiation plan for the border dispute which was suggested by Slovenia to France". Pahor initially gave hints that Ljubljana was ready to find a solution at the negotiating table. "If Croatia does not open 10 chapters in December, it is obvious that it will not be able to close and conclude the negotiations by the end of 2009", said analyst Željko Trkanjec.

=== Disputed documents ===
On 19 December 2008 Slovenian Minister of foreign affairs Samuel Žbogar revealed to the Slovene public the documents from 7 chapters that Croatia was negotiating with the EU, and which were the main reason for the Slovenian negotiation blockade. According to Žbogar, these were documents from the chapters Agriculture, Food safety, Veterinary & Phytosanitary Policy, Taxation, Infrastructure, Regional politics and structural instruments, Justice, Freedom and Security as well as Environment.

- In the chapter on agriculture, the disputed settlements on the left side of the Dragonja river (Škrile, Bužin, Škudelini, and Veli Mlin) were stated as part of Croatia.
- In food safety, the disputed point was the Croatian epicontinental area in the Adriatic Sea.
- In the chapter on taxation, the border crossing Plovanija is explicitly stated, regarding the temporary border control point at Sečovlje; in 1994, the prime minister Nikica Valentić had explicitly and in writing stated that this control point does not prejudge the border.
- In infrastructure, maps were enclosed that show the proposed sea border.
- In the area of regional policymaking, the stumbling point was the intervention plan in case of sea pollution, which mentions the ZERP, and maps were enclosed which show the proposed sea border.
- In the chapter on justice, maps were enclosed that show the border crossings, mentioning Plovanija and cadastral parcels from the cadastre which was created after 25 June 1991.
- In the chapter on the Environment, the ZERP was mentioned and maps were enclosed that show the proposed sea border.

Minister Žbogar told the reporters that Slovenia must "protect its national interests" and that "Slovenia does not enjoy this position". He added that for any arbitration Slovenia would not use documents that were created after 25 June 1991 and the Conference at Brijuni.

On 23 June 2009, Slovenia blocked the closing of another chapter in Croatia's EU accession negotiations, Statistics, leaving Zagreb with a total of 13 blocked chapters. The explanation was that the statistics chapter contained maps with Croatia's borders pre-drawn against Slovenia's wishes.

On 24 July 2009, Slovenia officially blocked the closing of the policy chapter Freedom of Movement for Workers in Croatia's EU accession talks, explaining similarly to before that in that chapter, too, Croatia had submitted documents "prejudging the Croatian-Slovene border"; this raised the number of blocked chapters to 14. Slovenia was the only EU member country that withheld its consent for the closing of the Freedom of Movement for Workers chapter. Slovene officials said the reason for such a decision was that in its documents submitted to the European Commission, Croatia referred to the Act on the Office of Notary Public, which in turn referred to the Act on Towns and Municipalities and its list of towns and municipalities in Croatia, including four border villages in Istria that Slovenia disputes.

A source in the Swedish EU Presidency said that despite the blockade, Croatia was continuing with reforms within the accession process; this was taken note of at the enlargement task force meeting.

=== French proposal for solving the blockade ===
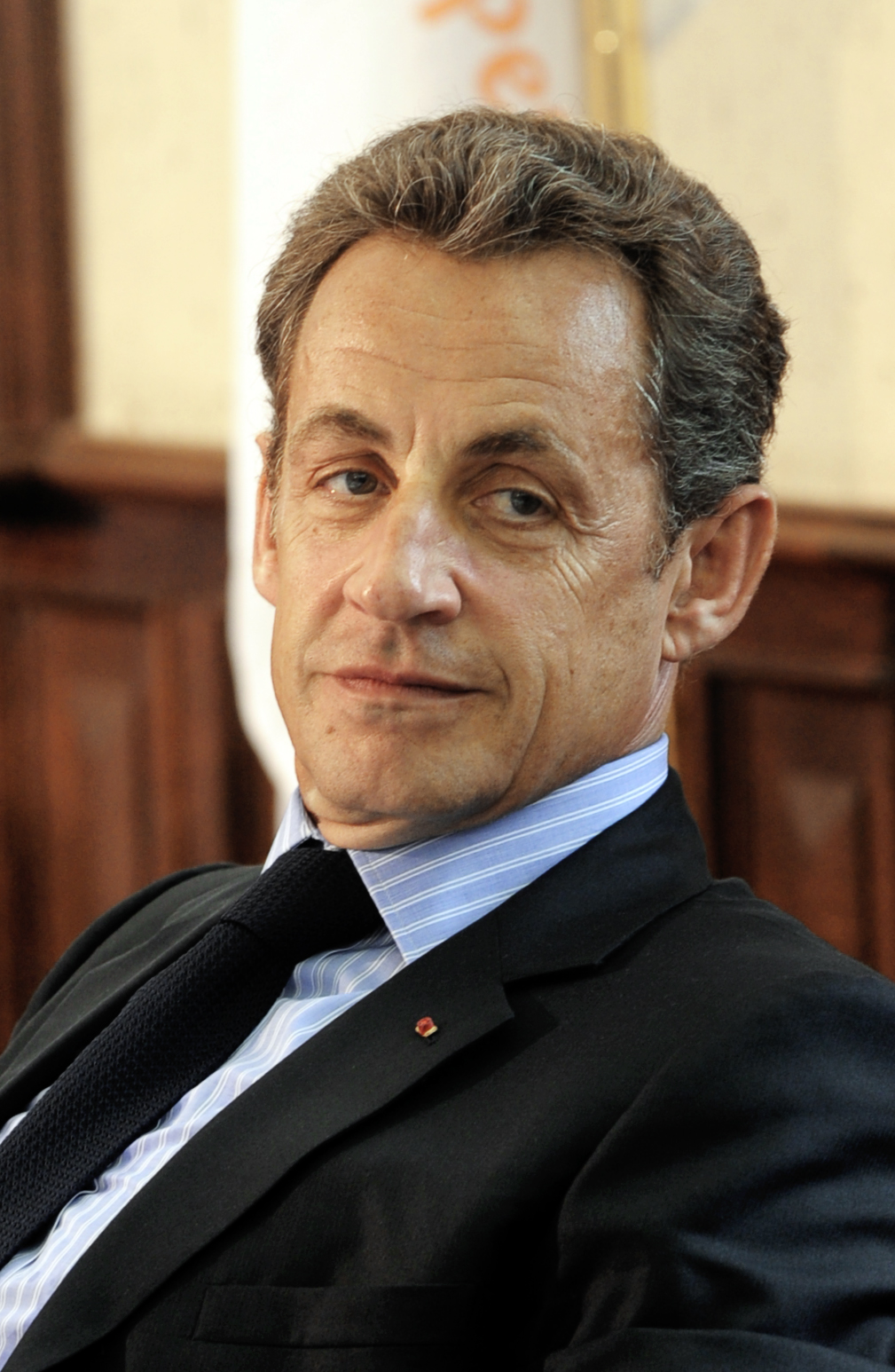
Nicolas Sarkozy tried to unblock the negotiation procedure. Slovenia rejected his proposal.

The French proffered a simple document that would finish the dispute, namely a signed declaration of both sides that neither is prejudging the border. The Committee of Permanent Representatives discussed over three days the Slovene-proposed amendments on the French proposal for unblocking the negotiation process; its chairman, French ambassador at the EU Pierre Sellal, stated that he is "in touch with the Slovene colleague in order to find a fair solution". All other member states were for the French proposal; only Slovenia was for the Slovene amendments.

Sellal also said "One needs to understand that the negotiations of Croatia's EU accession cannot have the goal to resolve bilateral issues between Croatia and Slovenia. I respect the Slovenian opinion, but I will try during the accession negotiations to prevent a possible predisposition of the border. These negotiations are neutral towards the bilateral and local relationships between Slovenia and Croatia". French Foreign Minister Bernard Kouchner expressed his surprise at Slovenia's move to block Croatia just due to the dispute over a "few kilometres of coast". The Slovene correspondent to Večer from Brussels, Darja Kocbek, expressed her concern on the Razgledi portal that "Croatian lobbyists may be more successful than Slovenian lobbyists".

Sarkozy used the upcoming second vote of Ireland for the Treaty of Lisbon 2009 to insert a protocol for the accession of Croatia into the EU. Sarkozy told journalists: "To give a legal value to the engagements made to Ireland by the 26 other member states, we have committed that at the time of the next EU enlargement – whether that will be in 2010 or in 2011, when probably Croatia will join us... we will use that to add a protocol (on Ireland) to Croatia's accession treaty". The announcement confirmed that the Balkan country with an EU candidate status since 2004 and in EU accession talks since 2005 could effectively become the bloc's 28th member state by 2011 at the latest".

Pahor stated that unless all his terms are met, there would be no new momentum in the negotiation process. Pahor told Sanader that he no longer had anything to discuss with him one to one and nothing more to say than he had already said in front of the media. On 19 December 2008 Slovenia officially blocked the opening of new chapters between the EU and Croatia. Slovenia remained the only EU member state that insisted on the blockade; the other 26 states approved the continuation of accession negotiation between Croatia and the EU. Pahor's government was criticized from outside; Hannes Swoboda declared that the EU should tell Ljubljana that "it doesn't go that way". Some questioned if Pahor's blockade was actually a red herring trying to gain concessions from both the EU and Croatia.

Commercial TV station POP TV conducted an internet poll in which 10,000 Slovenian viewers participated; 84% of them believe their government's blockade decision was "completely justified". The same station quoted Minister Žbogar who said that the maps displayed by Croatia were a "problem" to Slovenia and that they must not be used in arbitration. "If Croatia says that she won't give away her territory for the EU, the same goes for us", he said.

Croatian president (at the time) Stipe Mesić said "This is not our problem any more, this is now Brussels' problem" in reaction to the blockade. He also said it was a mistake that would harm economic and other relations between Croatia and Slovenia.

"The blockade of 10 chapters, 8 for opening and 2 for closing, is a move without precedent in the history of the negotiations of European Union", said Croatia's then Prime Minister Ivo Sanader. "If it doesn't rethink its stance and change its decision of the blockade of Croatian negotiations, the Slovenian government will show exclusiveness, which is in discrepancy with the basic principles of solidarity, community, supranationalism and good neighbor relations on which the EU and the whole Europe are based", added Sanader in a special news conference summoned after the intent of Slovenia to put a blockade.

A couple of anonymous groups on Croatian websites urged the Croatian public to boycott all Slovene products, even though Sanader urged the people not do so.

Bernd Posselt, the German representative at the European parliament, condemned on 18 December 2008 the Slovenian government's act of blockade, calling it "Anti-European aggression". Posselt, a representative of the Bavarian CSU Party in the European parliament, also called it an act of "ransom": "The Slovene socialist government is abusing its right for a veto. Because of a marginal bilateral dispute, Slovenia is blackmailing the middle European candidate country Croatia, excellently prepared for an EU accession, even though the deeply pro-European Croatian government expressed its readiness to let all the unresolved problems get resolved at the international arbitration a long time ago", he said. He also added he feels "disappointed and double-crossed by Borut Pahor's administration, who previously promised a balanced and constructive relationship with Zagreb".

The European Commission regretted Slovenia's decision to block Croatia. Crisztina Nagy, a commission spokeswoman, said "The commission has consistently maintained the view that the border issue is a bilateral issue that should not be brought to the table of the accession negotiations."

=== Slovenia's threat to block Croatia's NATO accession ===
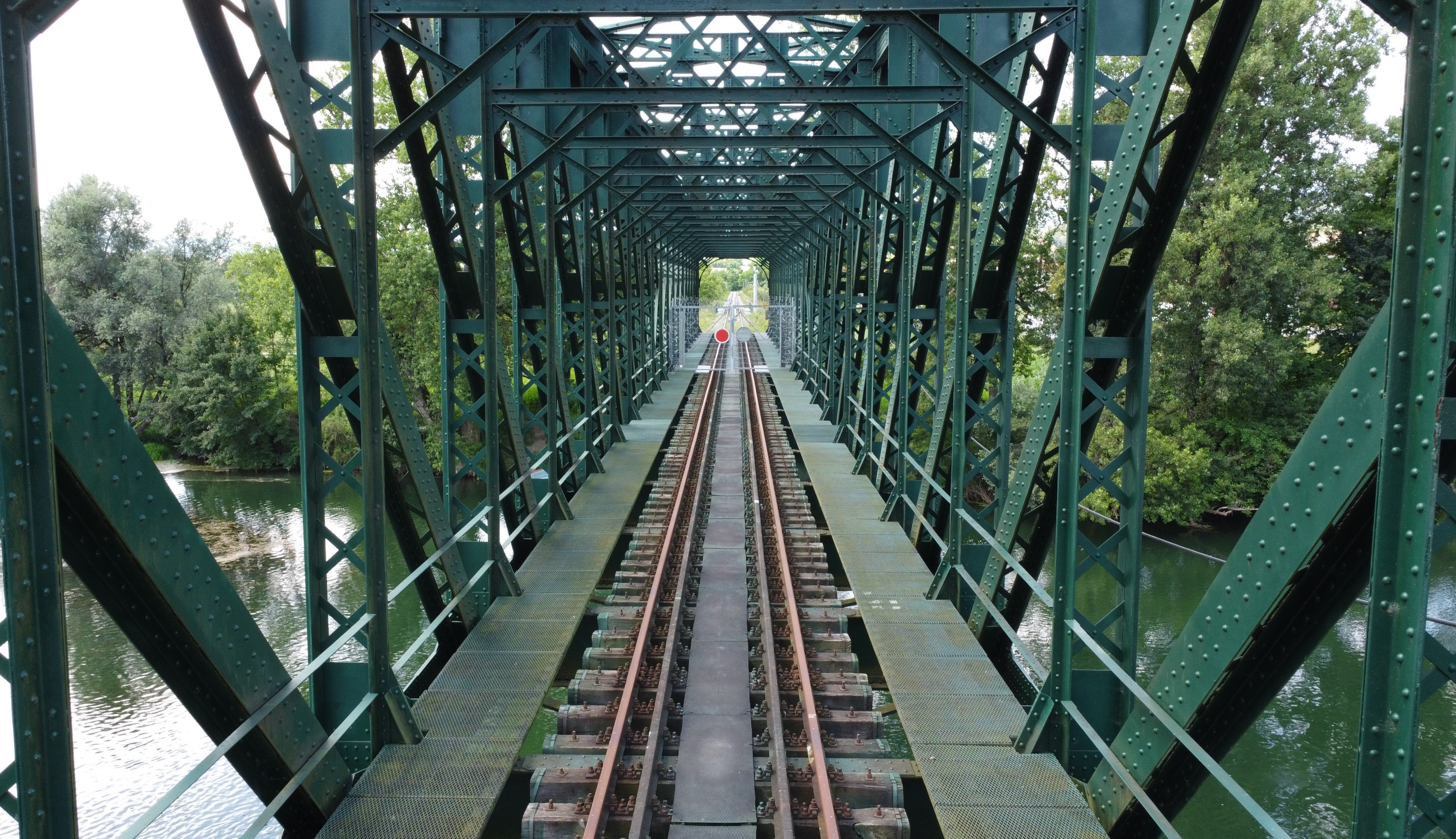
Croatia-Slovenia border bridge (Bubnjarci - Rosalnice) - track blocked with a fence

In January 2009, some Slovenian politicians started threatening to also block Croatia's accession into NATO. Slovene Prime Minister Borut Pahor stated his regret on 29 January of the move by the opposition Slovenian Democratic Party (SDS), which threatened to boycott the assembly that was supposed to decide about the ratification of accession protocols into NATO of the future member states Croatia and Albania; as a result, the assembly had to be postponed. However, the Slovenian parliament ultimately ratified Croatia's NATO accession. An unforeseen complication arose when the small, extra-parliamentary Party of Slovenian Nation (SSN) and the Institute 25 June gathered over 5,000 signatures; according to the Slovenian Constitution, this gave it time until March 2009 to gather an additional 40,000 signatures to mandate a referendum on Croatia joining NATO. NATO then expressed concern about such a complication. Controversy erupted over claims that Andrej Šiško, a SSN member convicted for an attempted murder and sentenced to 22 months in prison, was released for a day in Rogoza to attend the negotiations of the highest body of his Party with Pahor about preventing a referendum.

Croatian newspaper Večernji list columnist Milan Jajčinović wrote in response "Slovenia's Prime Minister Borut Pahor, it seems, got scared of the created madness he himself contributed to. And he is not the only Slovenian politician whose (ill) considered statements participated in creating intolerance towards Croatia...Problems with Croatia have already for years been exaggerated or even made up, and then such constructions are used to madden the masses... The tactic is always the same: at first a politician finds a grouch against Croatia, then the media publish it, the public gets upset and agitated, hysteria breaks out, and then those same politicians show up again, because 'the public opinion demands it'".

The referendum attempt was not successful (less than 2,500 more signatures were gathered), allowing Croatia to become a full NATO member in April 2009, although the process's constitutionality was questioned. Croatia's NATO membership prompted discussions about Pahor's wishing Croatia to join NATO but blocking it from joining the EU.

=== EU proposal for mediation in the border dispute ===
On 22 January 2009, the European Commission announced that it was ready to create a three-member committee to mediate in the border row. According to reports, Finland's Nobel Prize winner Martti Ahtisaari and the French legal expert Robert Badinter were supposed to be members. The report came out just a day after Olli Rehn visited politicians in Ljubljana and Zagreb.

At first, Ivo Sanader rejected meeting with Pahor without European Commission participation, but he then decided to compromise and agreed. After multiple complications around the meeting's location and time, the meeting was held on 24 February 2009 in Macelj, but nothing significant was achieved. Subsequently, the Slovenian government blocked the Statistics accession negotiation chapter, totalling 13 blocked chapters in Croatia's EU membership talks. A second meeting was planned on 28 April 2009 in Croatia, but it was cancelled by the Slovenian side.

On 17 April, Mesić re-stated his puzzlement regarding Pahor's blocking the accession talks instead of resolving the issue at the International Court of Justice: "I don't understand, why is Slovenia so afraid of International Law? That's the only enigma I can't comprehend".

In June 2009, Croatia accepted Rehn's proposal for an arbitration commission, but Slovenia rejected it and proposed four amendments. Out of four amendments proposed by Slovenia, Rehn accepted just one, for the three 'ad hoc' arbitrage judges to be selected by the two parties in dispute from a proposed list instead of the ICJ's president. However, Croatia refused this amendment after reviewing the list proposed, which mainly had 'legal experts' and not renowned judges, and decided for the original proposal, which Ljubljana rejected. At the same time, the Slovenian delegation also opposed this as it failed to guarantee a successful outcome. Sanader proposed that the two parliaments ratify a statement that none of the documents presupposes the border, and should Slovenia not accept this, that European Commission lawyers should examine the documents to determine whether it is true. If Ljubljana should reject both proposals, "it is up to the EU to decide how the accession talks with Croatia should end and whether the article 7 of the EU contract should be activated", which implies revoking voting rights of a member country that is persistently violating EU principles. Sanader added that Pahor "should ask Berlusconi for some sea".

On 1 July 2009, Croatia's prime minister Ivo Sanader unexpectedly resigned. He held a brief news conference before announcing his decision. Jadranka Kosor succeeded him.

=== Kosor–Pahor meetings and the end of the blockade ===
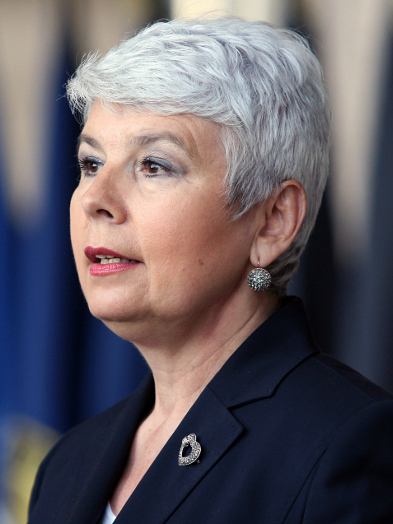
Jadranka Kosor, Croatia's Prime Minister in 2009

On 31 July 2009, the second meeting between the Croatian–Slovenian governments was held, this time in Croatia at the Trakošćan castle. The meeting between the newly appointed Croatian Prime Minister Jadranka Kosor and her Slovenian counterpart Borut Pahor was reportedly constructive and respectful. "We have found the road to take...I am very satisfied we [have] started to agree on issues in the interest of both countries", Kosor stated. Pahor argued it is likely that the border dispute's solution and EU access for Croatia will be accomplished this year. One solution could be an area of shared sovereignty (possibly involving joint governance structures) over the Savudrija Cove, also known as the Piran Bay.

On 11 September 2009, Kosor and Pahor met in Ljubljana, and agreed on the final details of an agreement to end the blockade. After Kosor sent a letter from Ljubljana to the EU presidency announcing Croatia does not wish to prejudge the border and that border dispute negotiations will take place under EU supervision, Pahor said that Slovenia's blockade will soon be lifted.

Pahor said his government would immediately propose to the Slovenian parliament that "Slovenia removes restraints for Croatia's EU negotiating process". For her part, Croatia's prime minister said she had faxed a letter to the Swedish EU presidency saying they had "reached an agreement on the continuation of talks with the EU and continuation of the border talks... No document can be prejudicial to the final border solution", she added. Pahor claimed it was a "victory for both countries".

Delo editorialized that this Slovenian/Croatian agreement was a "return to common sense". The Slovene People's Party (SLS) announced that it would start collecting signatures of support for a referendum on the arbitration agreement between Slovenia and Croatia that is to determine the manner in which the final border between the two countries is to be set down.

Kosor and Pahor met again on 26 October 2009 in Zagreb and worked out the final proposal of an arbitration agreement. On 2 November 2009 the Croatian Parliament gave its consent to the Arbitration Agreement with Slovenia.

The Arbitration Agreement between Croatia and Slovenia was signed in Stockholm on 4 November 2009, by both countries' prime ministers, Jadranka Kosor and Borut Pahor, and the EU President, Fredrik Reinfeldt.

Despite the agreement, the Slovenian government did not lift the blockade of three chapters – on the environment, on fisheries, and on foreign security and defence policy. Samuel Žbogar, Slovenia's foreign minister, declared in December 2009 that his government had "reservations" about the three chapters' substance.

However, a Slovenian referendum was held on 6 June 2010 on approving an agreement to bring the border dispute with Croatia before an international arbitration tribunal. The agreement was supported by 51.48% of voters and opposed by 48.52%, allowing arbitration to resolve the border dispute.

== Arbitration tribunal ==
On 25 May 2011 Croatia and Slovenia submitted their arbitration agreement to the UN, a necessary step before the arbitration process could begin. The treaty specifies that the arbitration process will happen after UN registration and Croatia's signing of its accession into the European Union. "It has been decided that an ad-hoc arbitral tribunal will be used to resolve the outstanding disputes. It is now believed that with the submission of the agreement to the UN that the arbitration tribunal could begin within a year, but is expected to take at least three years to reach a decision that will be binding upon each country."

=== Slovenian breach of agreement and Croatian withdrawal ===
On 22 July 2015, a major international scandal occurred during arbitration procedure when the Croatian daily newspaper Večernji list published transcripts and audio recordings showing that a Slovenian judge on the arbitration panel, Jernej Sekolec, had been in collusion with Simona Drenik, a representative from the Slovenian government. Sekolec, a member of the arbitration panel, allegedly put pressure on other arbitration panel members, Gilbert Guillaume (France), Bruno Simma (Germany) and Vaughan Lowe (UK), to rule in Slovenia's favor, and helped Slovenia by revealing secret communications, which was strictly forbidden by arbitration rules. In addition, Croatian Foreign Minister Vesna Pusić stated on 29 July 2015, during the meeting with foreign ambassadors to Croatia, that Sekolec inserted additional documents into the case files after the arbitration had already started which was also against the arbitration rules.

A Permanent Court of Arbitration internal investigation, however, concluded that no leak of information had occurred. On 23 July, Sekolec resigned and Simona Drenik offered her resignation. On 24 July 2015, the Croatian government called for a meeting of the Sabor to discuss exiting arbitration over the reported breaches in the arbitration tribunal.

Three days later Prime Minister Zoran Milanović announced the withdrawal of Croatia from arbitration after a meeting with the leaders of parliamentary groups. On 28 July 2015 Slovenia appointed Ronny Abraham, president of the International Court of Justice as their choice on arbitration panel. On 29 July 2015, the Croatian Parliament unanimously decided to cancel arbitration due to the allegations of significant breaches of arbitration rules by Slovenia as allowed by the Vienna Convention on the Law of Treaties. On 5 August 2015, after eight days in service, Ronny Abraham resigned.

The president of the tribunal appointed Rolf Einar Fife of Norway and Nicolas Michel of Switzerland as new arbitrators for Slovenia and Croatia, respectively, on 25 September, to replenish the tribunal's open seats and to proceed with its work.

On 2 December 2015, the arbitral tribunal deciding on the border between Slovenia and Croatia asked both countries for additional submissions concerning Croatia's decision to unilaterally withdraw from arbitration and scheduled a hearing on 17 March 2016.

On 1 July 2016, the arbitral tribunal decided that Slovenia did violate the agreement, but not in a way that would prevent the tribunal from completing the task and stated that arbitration shall continue.

=== Verdict ===
On 29 June 2017, the Arbitration Tribunal announced its decision in the border dispute. The ruling was hailed by Slovenia but Croatia announced that it will not accept it because it left the trial in 2015.

Mura River region

In respect of the Mura River region, the Tribunal determined that generally, the international boundary follows the aligned cadastral limits. Regarding the hamlet of Brezovec-del/Murišće, the Tribunal determined that the boundary between Croatia and Slovenia runs to the south-east of the settlement. In the areas of Novakovec, Ferketinec, and Podturen in Croatia and Pince in Slovenia, the boundary continues to follow the limits of the cadastres of Croatia and Slovenia as they stood before the purported modifications in 1956. Regarding Mursko Središće and Peklenica, the Tribunal determined that the boundary is in the middle of the Mura River as recorded in the agreed 1956 Minutes on the Determination of the Borders of the Cadastral District of Peklenica.

Central Region

The boundary in the Razkrižje area follows the aligned cadastral limits, as well as in the case of Santavec River and Zelena River areas. Along the Drava River, the Tribunal determined that the boundary follows the aligned cadastral limits, which run along a series of historic boundary stones recorded in a 1904 protocol. The boundaries in the Slovenian region of Macelj and the Croatian region of Haloze are set out in Slovenia's cadastre. Along the disputed areas along the Sotla River, the Tribunal determined that the boundary generally follows the cadastral limits where aligned, two disputed areas follow the Croatia's cadastral register. Along the Sava and Bregana Rivers, the border follows the aligned cadastral limits. In the Gorjanci/Žumberak area, where cadastral boundaries on Slovenian and Croatian cadastral maps coincide, they are the borders of the disputed areas. In one location where the cadasters did not coincide, the Slovenian cadaster prevailed over an 1898 Croatian cadastral map. The settlement of Drage lies in Slovenia. The Tribunal declared that in the Trdinov Vrh/Sveta Gera area, the border follows the cadastral limits. The barracks are on Croatian territory; however, the Tribunal "observes that it has no jurisdiction to address Croatia's request for a declaration as to the presence of Slovenian civilian and military personnel in that area". Along the Kamenica River, the border follows Croatia's claim. Along Čabranka River, the border follows the cadastral limits. The same holds for the area near Črneča Vas. The boundary near the hamlets of Draga and Novi Kot in Slovenia and Prezid in Croatia was demarcated in 1913.

Istria Region

The area referred to as the "Tomšič plots" is located in Slovenia. The area near Gomance forms part of Slovenia's territory. In the case of areas near Klana and Zabiče on the one hand and Lisac and Sušak on the other hand, the border follows the cadastral map from 1878. The area of Kućibreg/Topolovec is divided according to the Croatian claim. The Tribunal has decided that land border in Istria follows the Dragonja river and ends in the middle of the Channel of St. Odorik.

Bay of Piran and junction regime

The Tribunal has decided and that maritime border should be a straight line that connects the land border at the mouth of the Dragonja River to the point at the end of the gulf, which is three times closer to Croatia than to the Slovenian side, therefore awarding Slovenia 3/4 of the gulf. In addition, the Tribunal ruled that Slovenia has a right for junction through the Croatian territorial water which, according to the Tribunal, should be 2.5 nautical miles wide and would be connected to the border.

=== International reactions ===
Austria - Austrian President Alexander Van der Bellen said during his visit to Slovenia in May 2017, that he believed that Slovenia and Croatia should accept the verdict. In July 2017, during official visits of Croatian and Slovene Presidents in Salzburg, he stated that countries should accept the verdict as a crucial step in finding a permanent solution to the border dispute, that his country would stay neutral in the matter and has offered help in resolving dispute. Austrian Foreign Minister Karin Kneissl supported Slovenian position about implementation of Final Award after meeting with Foreign Minister Erjavec on 20 March 2018.

Benelux - Prime Ministers Xavier Bettel, Mark Rutte and Charles Michel issued a joint statement in which they supported the verdict and called on "both parties to adhere to an arbitrary decision-making structure."

European Union - On 4 July 2017, European Commission issued an official statement in which it expressed its support for the arbitration procedure and final award, adding that Slovenia and Croatia should accept and implement it. Vice-President of the European Commission Frans Timmermans stated that both Croatia and Slovenia should respect the verdict, adding that EC will help in verdict's implementation but that EC would not order implementation since it's a bilateral issue which is not within the scope of the EU. In the Minutes of the Meeting from 4 July 2017 EC once more said that Slovenia did act in violation of Arbitration Agreement, however, PCA stated in the Partial Award, that the violation was not of such nature, that it would influence the Final Award of the tribunal and that the judge involved in the violation of the agreement was replaced by another judge. Vice-President Timmermans said that EC unequivocally supported the process. The Legal Service of the EC stated during the meeting that the EU has a jurisdiction in respect of this matter and that it is obligation of the EU and Member States to implement public international law (Final Award by the PCA). High Representative of the Union for Foreign Affairs and Security Policy Federica Mogherini stressed the importance of respecting international treaties.

Manfred Weber, leader of the European People's Party Group, said that "Croatia and Slovenia should continue the dialogue about the border dispute", while Guy Verhofstadt, leader of the Alliance of Liberals and Democrats for Europe Group, called on implementation of the verdict.

In January 2020, following Slovenia's action against Croatia before the European Court of Justice, the Court ruled that it had no jurisdiction to rule on the dispute and merely urged both sides to resolve their differences. The decision was final and there was no appeal.

France - French Ministry of Foreign Affairs and International Development didn't issue an official statement on the matter, but wrote on its web site in a section in which it responds to journalists' questions that France "hopes that territorial controversy will soon be resolved in a constructive spirit, a spirit of reconciliation and dialogue, that would be in favor of the European Union and regional stability of the Western Balkans". During 2017 Bled Strategic Forum, French Minister for European Affairs Nathalie Loiseau expressed her support for the "principle of respect for international law and decisions of international courts".

Germany - German Embassy in Croatia issued a statement in which it praised International Arbitration Tribunal as a "valuable instrument of international law" and has called on implementation of the verdict, adding that "member states of the European union must make a good example for others." German Foreign Minister Sigmar Gabriel stated, during the press conference in Berlin in June 2017, that Germany "calls upon both countries to accept the verdict and implement it". According to the Slovenian Prime Minister Miro Cerar, German Chancellor Angela Merkel confirmed to him during their meeting at a 2017 Western Balkans Summit that her government believes that verdict should be implemented.

Italy - Prime Minister Paolo Gentiloni stated during the state visit to Slovenia that Italy supported the position of the European Commission.

Russia - Russian Minister of Communications and Mass Media Nikolay Nikiforov stated during his visit to Slovenia that the verdict should be implemented, but that Slovenia shouldn't interrupt bilateral dialogue on resolving other opened disputes between the countries.

United States - United States embassy in Croatia confirmed to the Večernji List that the official stance of the United States is that "two countries, both EU members and allies in NATO, need to resolve this bilateral issue" and that they "encourage both countries to agree on the best path to its solution".

=== Potential OECD accession blockade ===
On 6 September 2017, Slovenia informed the Deputy Permanent Representatives of EU Member States that it could not support membership in the OECD "if a particular country does not meet the membership criteria (especially the rule of law, respecting the international law and international courts)", referring to Croatia's rejection of the arbitration verdict, although Slovenian Prime Minister Miro Cerar later added that the warning wasn't meant just for Croatia, but for any other country. Croatian Foreign Ministry pointed out that Slovenia's position was against the stance of the European Commission which since 2007 advocates ascension of all EU member states to the OECD.

=== Implementation of the arbitration and further development ===
On 14 September 2017, Croatian Prime Minister Andrej Plenković held consultations with representatives of all Croatian parliamentary parties on the border dispute on which they concluded that they still supported decision of the Croatian Parliament on Croatia's withdrawal from the arbitration process, and that it's necessary to continue the dialogue with the Slovenian government. Croatian daily newspaper Jutarnji list published an article in which it revealed that the Prime Minister Plenković was planning to suggest defining a neutral common fishing zone in the middle of the Bay which would be used both by Croatian and Slovenian fishermen under the same conditions. This solution is similar to the idea of the academician Davorin Rudolf who proposed that the Bay should be governed as condominium which means that it wouldn't be divided nor would it be extraterritorial, but that both Croatia and Slovenia would have sovereignty over it simultaneously. Slovenian Prime Minister Miro Cerar expressed satisfaction with the "reconciliatory tones of the Croatian Prime Minister" and stressed that bilateral talks should focus on "how to jointly enforce the tribunal's verdict", adding that his government would consider new suggestions referring to the condominium proposition, but that his stance is that the verdict should still be implemented. According to the map of the neutral common fishing zone given to the president of Croatian fishermen's association Mare Croaticum Daniele Kolec by the fisheries administration at the Croatian Ministry of Agriculture, the border on the sea, between Croatia and Slovenia is drawn according to the arbitration verdict. Two Prime Ministers arranged an official meeting on 29 September 2017 but the Slovenian Prime Minister has canceled meeting because of Prime Minister Plenković's statement on arbitration at the UN. Namely, Prime Minister Plenković stated in his speech before the UN General Assembly that Croatia had to come out of "a compromised arbitration" on the border dispute with Slovenia and warned that such "Slovenian disrespect of international law" would discourage other states from settling disputes with the help of a third party, adding that "Croatia is the one that adheres to the principles international law".

On 19 December 2017, Slovenian Prime Minister Miro Cerar met with Croatian Prime Minister Andrej Plenković in Zagreb. After the several-hour-long meeting, the prime ministers confirmed their previous standpoints, with Cerar stating that Croatia "works against civilization standards and good neighborly relations," and Plenković replying that arbitration ruling was "non-existent" and that 29 December would be a "day as any other".

On 29 December 2017, Slovenia started implementing arbitration ruling but only on sea while Croatia continued to oppose it. Several Croatian fishermen normally sailed at 4–5 a.m. and returned to the ports around 8 a.m. According to one fisherman, Slovenian police approached his boat and told him to leave the "Slovenian sea", but Croatian police arrived and parked between them, and after he finished fishing, escorted him to the port. Another stated that "Slovenian police officers always come to us if we work, they monitor us, say that we are in their waters, warn us, but they do not touch us, and our police is always next to us." Slovenian Foreign Ministry sent two diplomatic notes on the implementation of arbitration ruling to Croatia. In the first, it called Croatia for a dialogue on the implementation of the arbitration ruling, and in the second expressed protest against "the violation of the borderline at sea". In response, Croatian Foreign Ministry called on Slovenia to "refrain from the unilateral implementation of measures aimed at attempting to change the situation in the field" and on "a constructive dialogue on resolutions of border disputes".

In March 2018 Slovenia submitted a letter of complaint against Croatia to the European Commission. After the Commission refused to get involved, declaring neutrality, Slovenia brought an action against Croatia before the European Court of Justice in July 2018 asking the court to establish whether Croatia had breached articles of the EU treaty on respect for the rule of law and cooperation between member states. Slovenia also accused Croatia of violating the Common Fisheries Policy by sending police escorts to guard its fishing boats in contested waters, and preventing Slovenian inspectors from boarding the vessels. In January 2020 the Court of Justice said it had no jurisdiction to rule on the dispute and merely urged both sides to resolve their differences. The decision is final and there is no appeal.

== See also ==
- Croatia–Slovenia relations
- Croatia–Serbia border dispute
- Bosnia and Herzegovina–Croatia relations#Border issues
- List of territorial disputes
- 2010 Slovenian border dispute agreement referendum
