= Crveni Vrh =

Crveni Vrh: Monte Rosso; Monterosso
- Village
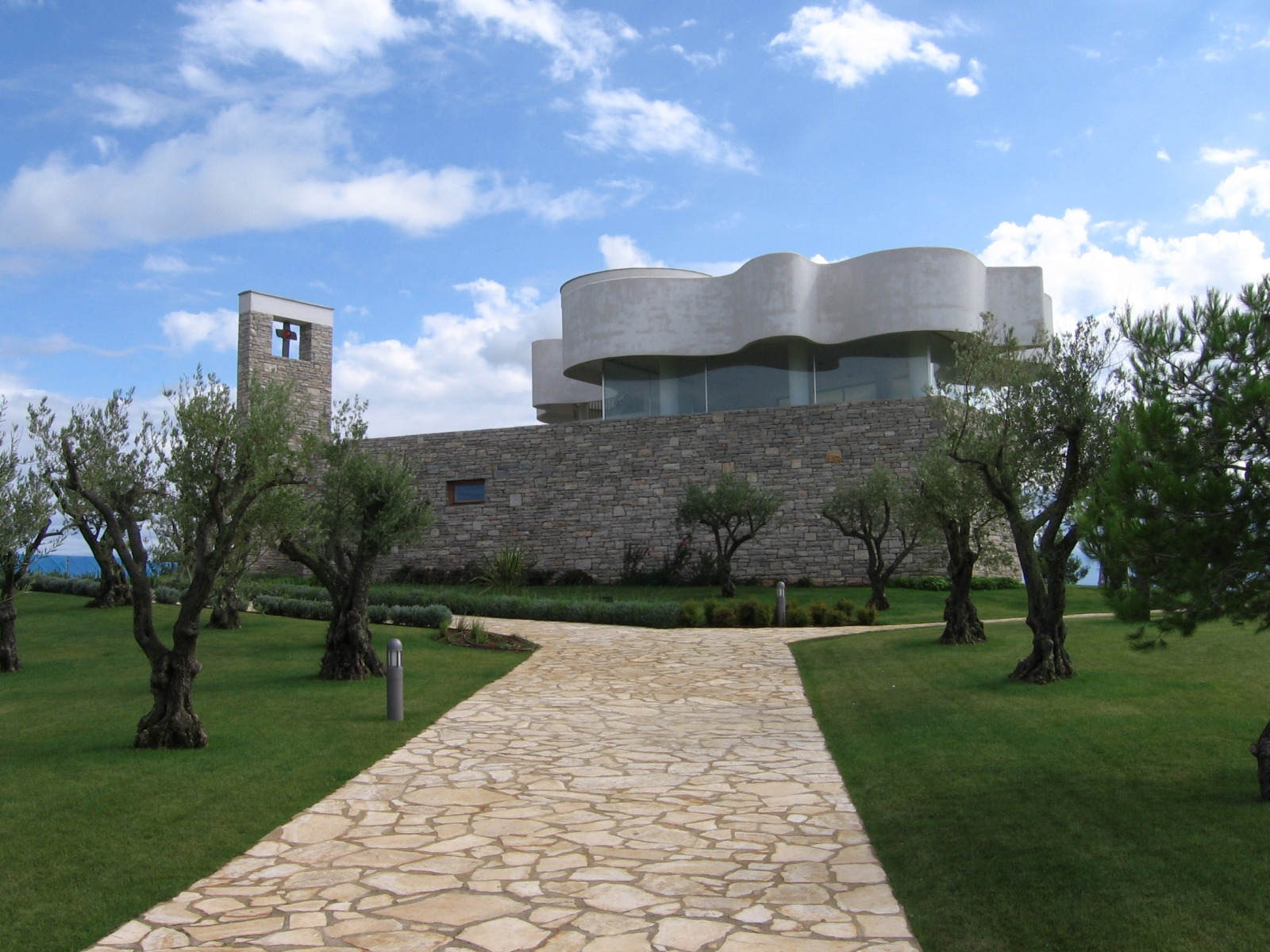

- Location within Croatia
- Coordinates: 45°27′24″N 13°32′17″E
- Country: Croatia
- County: Istria County
- Municipality: Umag

Area
  - Total: 2.7 sq mi (6.9 km^{2})

Population (2021)
  - Total: 177
  - Density: 66/sq mi (26/km^{2})
- Time zone: UTC+1 (CET)
  - Summer (DST): UTC+2 (CEST)
- Postal code: 52475 Savudrija
- Area code: 052

Crveni Vrh (Italian: Monte Rosso) is a coastal resort village on Savudrija peninsula in Umag municipality in Istria County, Croatia. It is located on Gulf of Piran with views towards Slovenian towns Portorož and Piran. Crveni Vrh real estate is one of the highest priced in Istria. Srečko Katanec, the former football player and national team manager, owns a villa in Crveni Vrh.

The western side of the Crveni Vrh is occupied exclusively by private houses and no hotels. The eastern side contains the Residence Skiper, one of the most luxurious and high priced apartment complexes in Istria, the Kempinski hotel, and the "only attractive golf location in Istria".

== Demographics ==
According to the 2021 census, its population was 177. It was 192 in 2011.

There are no known all-year-round residents in Crveni Vrh. In the early 1960s, a group of Slovenian families built first houses in the western Crveni Vrh, and most houses were built in the 1970s and 1980s. The two cojoined areas of the western Crveni Vrh are known as Laura and Riva. Over the past two decades, some houses were bought by Italian, Austrian, and Russian owners, but according to Glas Istre, "99 percent of the owners are Slovenian citizens". The mayor of Umag argued that "Slovenian villa owners occupied two kilometers of the coast" and built "private beaches and stairways".

In a series of articles published by Glas Istre and Jutarnji list in 2020 and 2021, media and local politicians expressed outrage with the coastal adaptations made by owners of houses in Crveni Vrh, and suggested that the coastal line needs to be replaced by a beach walk.

The residents are organized in a community association. The association's neighbourhood watch guard is on alert for unwanted or potentially dangerous visitors, and alerts owners in case of storms or weather issues. The association offers live webcams with the Crveni Vrh's Gulf of Piran views.

== Tourism ==
The five-star Kempinski Hotel Adriatic hotel offers "unique luxury" and in 2018 the hotel opened its beach. The Residence Skiper is a resort of about a dozen apartment villas, several pools, tennis and basketball courts, and an 18-hole golf course. The Residence Skiper, the beach, and the surrounding area is owned mostly by Miodrag Kostić, the wealthiest Serbian person.

The area is one of the fastest developing in Croatia. In 2021, in Crveni Vrh, Kostić started building Petram Resort which was named by daily Delo "this year's largest Croatian tourism investment."

Crveni Vrh is home to Monte Rosso, the largest private olive tree estate in Croatia, which is owned by two Slovenians. When Slovenia confiscated the house of bankruptcy manager Brane Gorše, it was the first out-of-country property that Slovenia had confiscated due to tax evasion.
