= Exclusive economic zone of France =

France has, due to its overseas departments and regions that are scattered in all the oceans of Earth, the largest exclusive economic zone in the world. The total EEZ of France is 10,911,921 km^{2} (4,213,116 mi^{2}).

It covers approximately 7% of the surface of all the EEZs of the world, while the French Republic is only 0.45% of the world's land surface.

== Geography ==
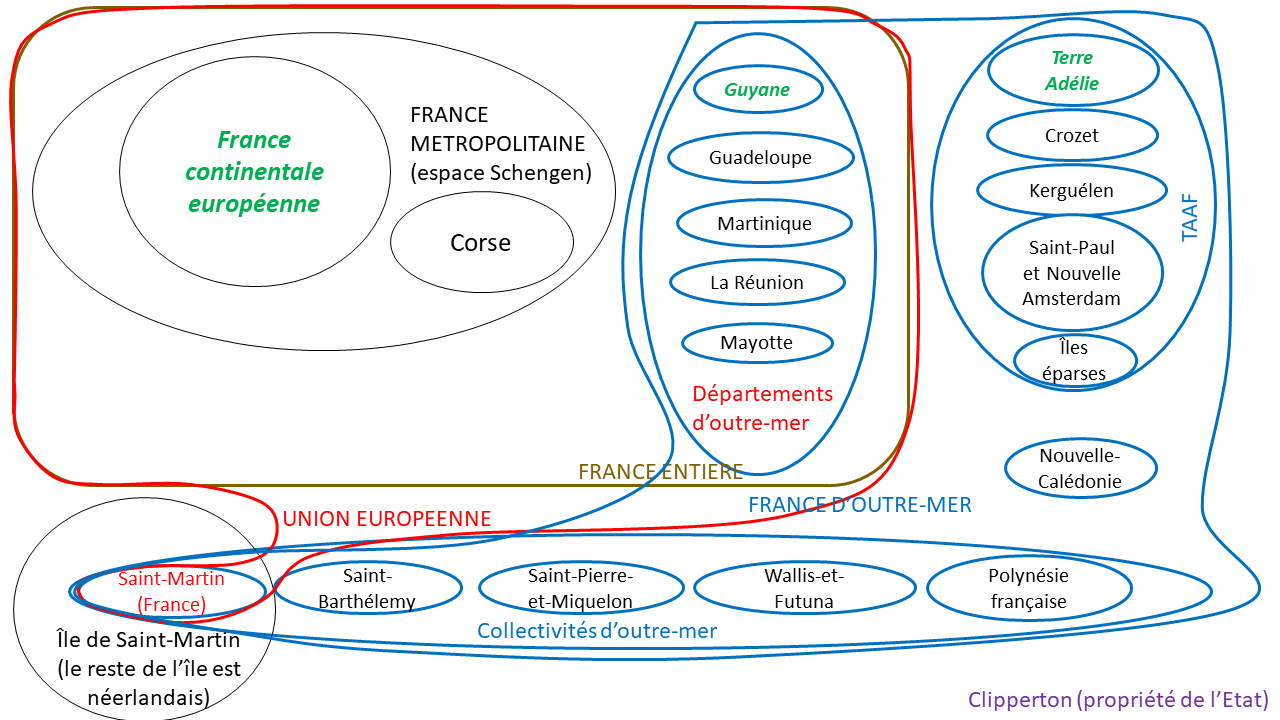
Metropolitan France and the overseas départements "départements d'outre-mer" make up the whole of France "France entière". "France entière" plus Saint-Martin are part of the EU. Continental France is in green and italics.

Monaco's waters are enclaves in the French EEZ. The situation is more unclear for the Channel Islands. Some maps show the EEZ being enclaved by the French EEZ, while others show the Guernsey EEZ extending to the border with the UK EEZ.

Outside of mainland France and overseas departments or communities (Guadeloupe, Guyane, Martinique, Mayotte, Réunion and Saint Martin), none of the territories below, and therefore their EEZ, is part of the European Union.

EEZ of mainland France, overseas departments and overseas communities
EEZ	Area of the EEZ (km^{2})	Representation
Metropolitan France	371,096	The EEZ of France
Saint Pierre and Miquelon	12,387	The EEZ of France
Guadeloupe and Martinique	138,440	The EEZ of France
Saint Barthélemy and Saint Martin	5,202	The EEZ of France
French Guiana	131,506	The EEZ of France
Réunion	317,356	The EEZ of France
Mayotte	69,238	The EEZ of France
Scattered Islands	634,853	The EEZ of France
Crozet Islands	572,919	The EEZ of France
Kerguelen	565,723	The EEZ of France
Île Saint-Paul and Île Amsterdam	510,699	The EEZ of France
New Caledonia	1,364,591	The EEZ of France
Wallis and Futuna	262,563	The EEZ of France
French Polynesia	4,793,620	The EEZ of France
Clipperton Island	436,431	The EEZ of France
Total	10,186,624 km^{2} (3,933,078 sq mi)	The EEZ of France

== Disputes ==
=== Active ===
- France claims some of Canada's EEZ at Saint Pierre and Miquelon, based on a new definition of the continental shelf and the exclusive economic zone between the two countries. Saint Pierre and Miquelon is entirely surrounded by Canada's EEZ.
- Mauritius claims sovereignty over Tromelin although it is not mentioned in the listing of the 8th article of the 1814 Paris Treaty. It is administered as part of the French Southern and Antarctic Lands.

== See also ==
- Geography of France
- Islands of France
- Exclusive economic zone of Italy
