= Exclusive economic zone of Italy =

Economic zone exclusive to Italy

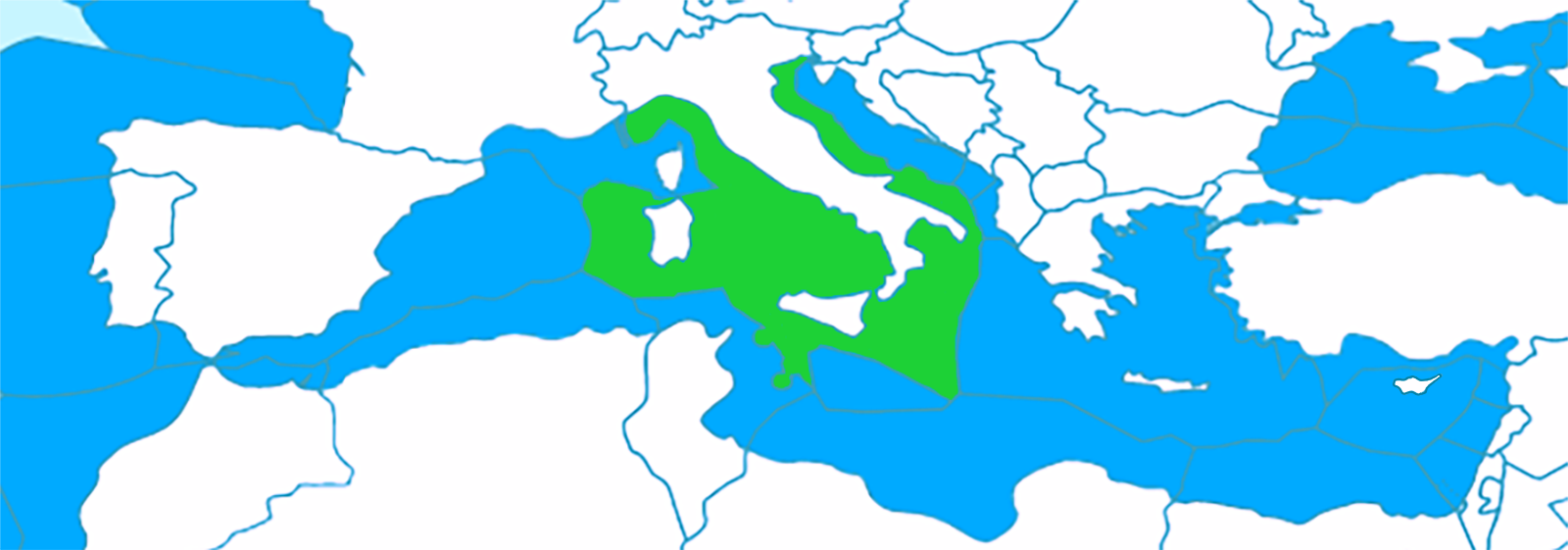
The exclusive economic zone of Italy shown in green

Italy has the world's 48th largest exclusive economic zone (EEZ), with an area of 541,915 km^{2} (209,235 mi^{2}). It claims an EEZ of 200 nmi (370.4 km; 230.2 mi) from its shores, which has long coastlines with the Tyrrhenian Sea to the west, the Ionian Sea to the south and the Adriatic Sea to the east. Its EEZ is limited by maritime boundaries with neighboring countries to the north-west, east and southeast.

Italy's western sea territory stretches from the west coast of Italy in the Tyrrhenian Sea including the island Sardinia. The island Sicily is in the southernmost area. Lampedusa is Italy's southernmost point. It shares treaty-defined maritime boundaries with France, Spain, Algeria, Tunisia, Libya, Malta, Greece, Albania, Montenegro, Croatia and Slovenia.

== History ==
At the end of the 1990s, no country bordering the Mediterranean Sea proclaimed an EEZ, even if it had the right to do so. The basis of this situation were above all geographical considerations: at no point in the Mediterranean are the coasts 400 or more miles away from the opposite coasts of another country. There were also reasons of expediency, e.g. avoid disturbing the status quo for possible disputes. The Mediterranean was therefore characterized by extensive areas of high seas, and there were only limited areas reserved for fishing, such as a Maltese EEZ of 25 miles. In Italy, UNCLOS entered into force on 16 December 1994.

At the end of the 20th century this principle was undermined by initiatives of some countries:

- 1994: Algeria's restricted fishing area
- 1997: Spain's fisheries protection zone
- 2003: ecological protection zones of France; Croatian ecological and fisheries protection zone
- 2005: Libya fisheries protection zone
- 2006: the ecological protection zone of Italy

A boost to the creation of EEZs came from the European Union's marine resources management policy in order to counter the development of illegal fishing by fishing vessels from Asian countries (see Common Fisheries Policy).

== Geography ==
These are the 10 largest islands of Italy.

Largest Italian Islands
Territory	km^{2}	sq mi	EEZ	Notes
Sicily	25,711	9,927		
Sardinia	24,089	9,301		
Elba	223	86		
Sant'Antioco	109	42		
Pantelleria	83	32		
San Pietro	51	20		
Asinara	51	20		
Ischia	46	18		
Lipari	37	14		
Salina	26	10		
Total	50,424	19,469		

== Disputes ==
=== Algeria ===
Algeria established an EEZ on 17 April 2018. On 28 November 2018 the permanent mission of Italy to the United Nations indicated with Spain that the Algerian measure was taken unilaterally and without consulting them. On 20 June 2019, Algeria communicated to the Italian embassy the eligibility for their exclusive economic zone.

=== Croatia ===
Croatia's ZERP (Ecological and Fisheries Protection Zone) in the Adriatic Sea caused friction with Italy and Slovenia, and caused problems during the accession of Croatia to the European Union.

Croatia and Italy signed an agreement on the delimitation of their Exclusive Economic Zones (EEZs) in May 2022, which entered into force in April 2024. On 3 January 2026, Italy formally established its Exclusive Economic Zone in the Adriatic Sea. In practical terms, this means that there is no longer any area of high seas between Croatia and Italy, as the maritime space between the two countries is now fully regulated under their respective EEZs.

=== France ===
On 21 March 2015, a treaty was signed in Caen to define the maritime borders along the French Riviera, between the Tuscan Archipelago and Corsica and north of Sardinia in the Strait of Bonifacio. This agreement would transpose the international norms on maritime borders respecting the principle of equidistance, replacing the Menton agreements of 1892 and incorporating the agreements on the Strait of Bonifacio of 1986. In January 2016, following the seizure of the fishing boat "Mina" off the Ligurian coast, the issue assumed relevance in the Italian political debate. Subsequently, France admitted the error in seizing the fishing boat since the treaty had not been ratified by the Italian parliament and was consequently null and void.

== See also ==
- Geography of Italy
- Exclusive economic zone of France
- Exclusive economic zone of Greece
- Exclusive economic zone of Spain
