= Sveta Gera =

Peak in Croatia and Slovenia

Coordinates: 45°46′N 15°19′E

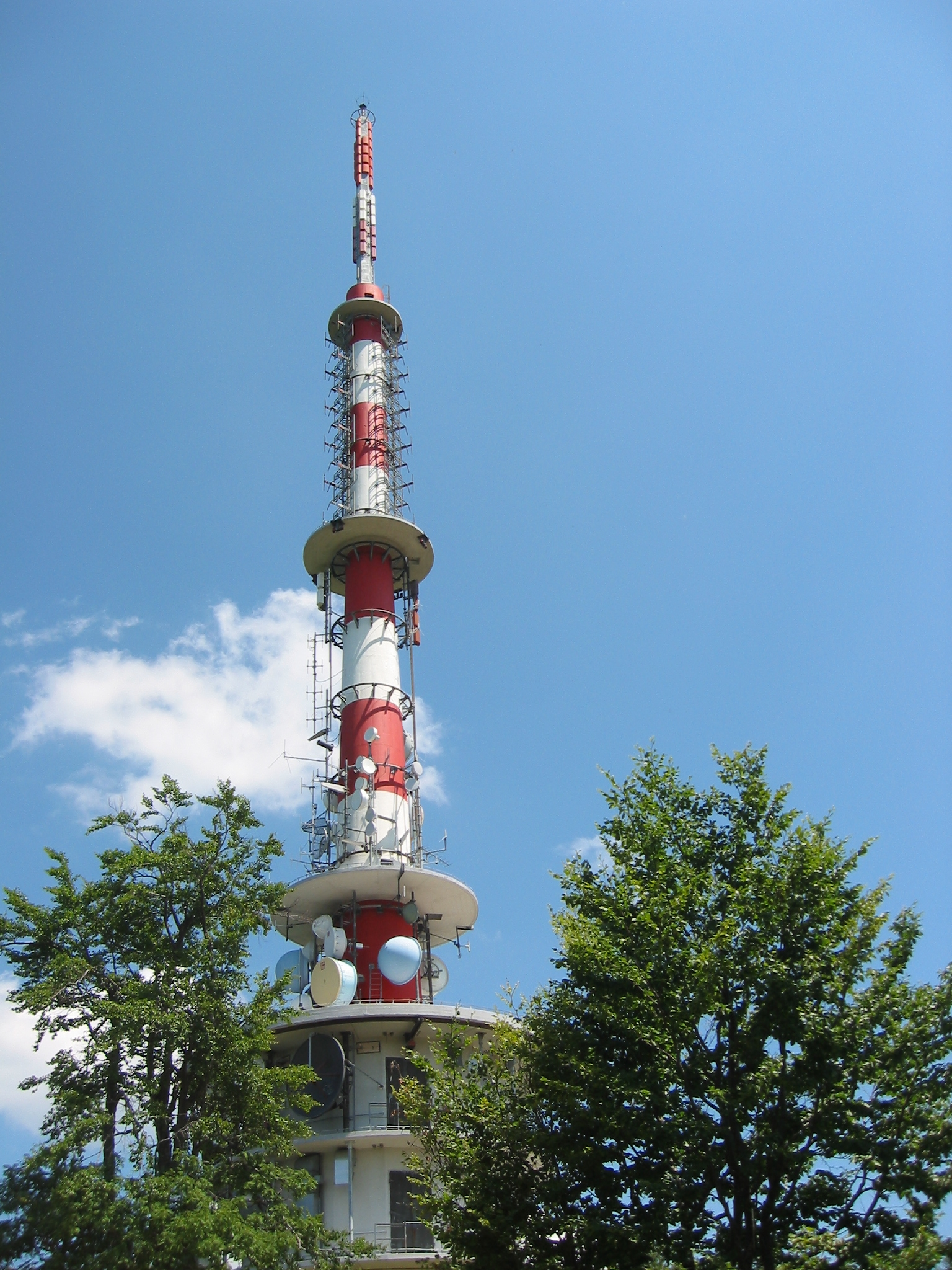
Telecommunication tower of the RTV Slovenija

Saint Gera (Croatian: "Sveta Gera") or Trdina Peak (Slovene: Trdinov vrh) is the highest peak of the Žumberak Mountains, at a height of 1,178 metres (3,865 ft). It is located along the border between southeastern Slovenia and Croatia, and the summit is subject to a border dispute between the two nations.

== Name ==
The peak was originally called Sveta Gera in Croatian and Sveta Jera in Slovene (Mount St. Gertrude) after the 15th-century church of Saint Gertrude some hundred meters from the highest point of the peak. In June 1921, however, the president of the Novo Mesto Mountaineering Club Ferdinand Seidl proposed to rename it after Janez Trdina, an ardent describer of the region. The proposal was submitted to the central Yugoslav government, which published a decree on the new name on 1 July 1922. On 15 August 1923, the peak was ceremonially renamed by a Slovene girl, while the accompanying ecclesiastic rituals were performed by a Croatian priest.

== Border dispute ==
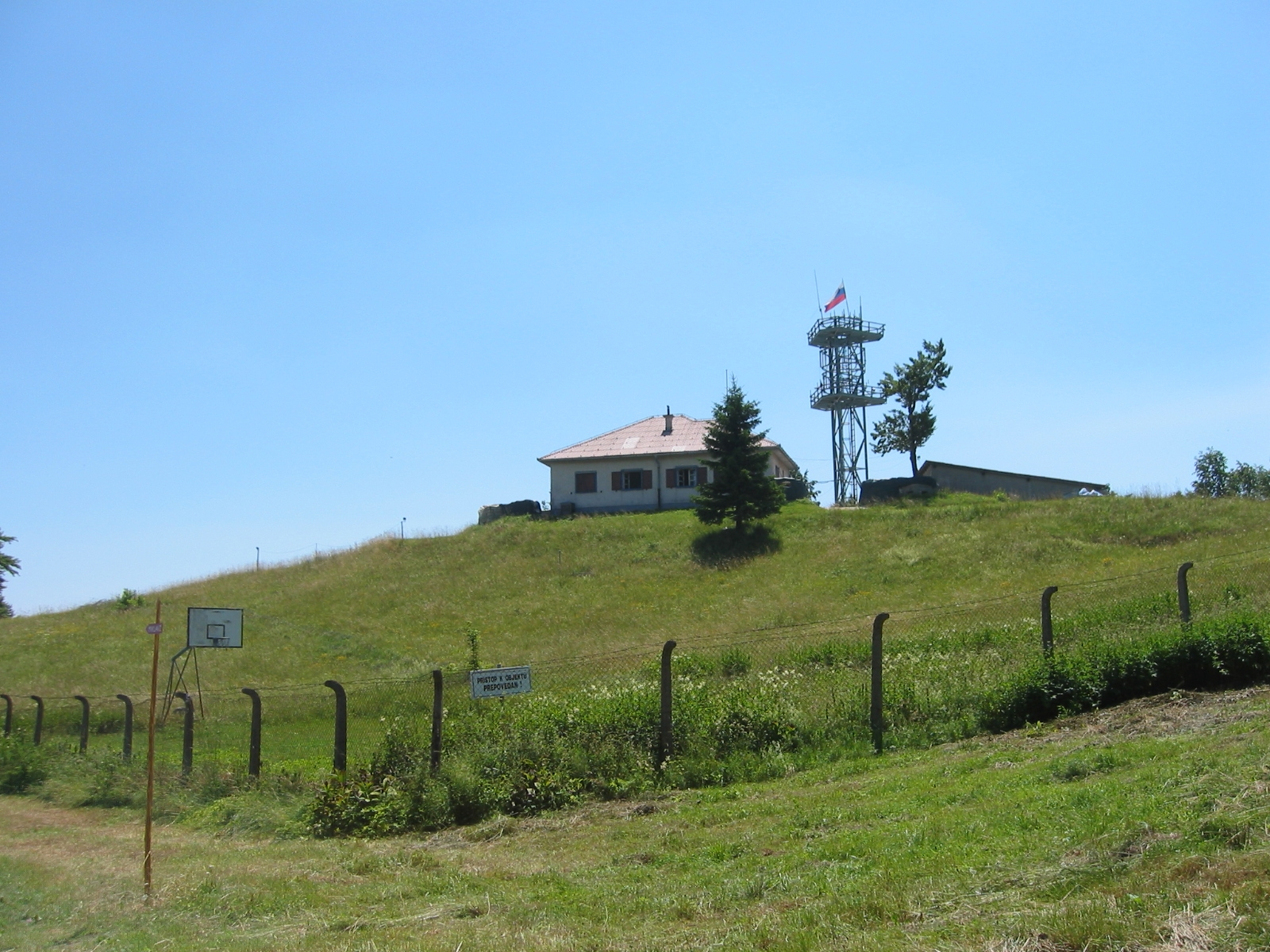
Military barrack at top of the Sveta Gera mountain

At the top of Sveta Gera, at an altitude of 1178 meters, there is a telecommunication tower and a military barracks whose location is strategically important to Croatia. The barracks were used by the Yugoslav People's Army (JNA) until early 1991 when its soldiers withdrew from the site following breakup of Yugoslavia. In June of the same year, Slovenian soldiers entered barracks on the basis of an oral agreement between Presidents of Slovenia and Croatia, Milan Kučan and Franjo Tuđman. Croatian President Tuđman considered that it would be better for Croatia to avoid conflicts with a friendly Slovenian army in the west since the country was threatened by the hostile JNA from the east. Although the Slovenian army announced many times that its soldiers would leave the barracks, particularly in 1998 and 2000, it did not happen. In 2004, President Kučan stated in an interview for Večernji list that it was time for the Slovenian soldiers to leave the barracks, adding that there was not a sufficient will of the Slovenian governing officials to do so. On 29 June 2017, the Arbitration Tribunal of the Permanent Court of Arbitration that was deciding on another border dispute between Croatia and Slovenia, mentioned in its verdict that Sveta Gera indeed belonged to Croatia but that it neither had jurisdiction to decide on the matter nor could it order Slovenian soldiers to withdraw.

== Bibliography ==
=== Biology ===
- Šašić, Martina; Nahirnić, Ana; Tarmann, Gerhard M. (2016-12-31). "Zygaenidae (Lepidoptera) in the Lepidoptera collections of the Croatian Natural History Museum". Natura Croatica: Periodicum Musei Historiae Naturalis Croatici. 25 (2): 233–248. doi:10.20302/NC.2016.25.19. eISSN 1848-7386.
