= Gulf of Piran =

Bay off Slovenia and Croatia

- Piran Bay, Savudrijska vala
- Piranski zaliv (Slovene)
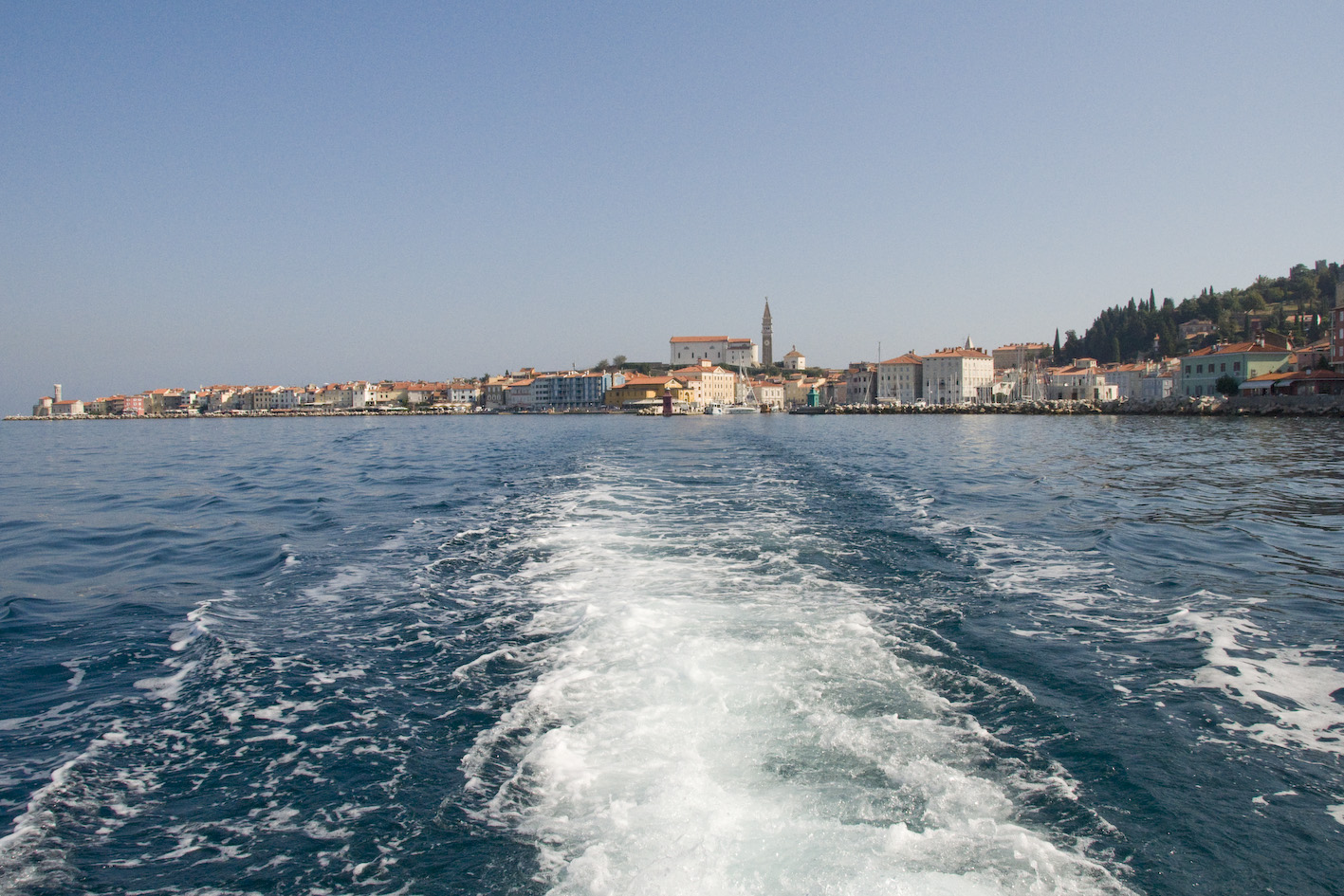
- Gulf of Piran

- Location within Croatia Location within Slovenia
- Interactive map of Gulf of Piran
- Location: Europe
- Coordinates: 45°30′16″N 13°33′43″E
- Basin countries: Slovenia, Croatia
- Surface area: 19 km^{2} (7.3 sq mi)
- Settlements: Piran, Portorož

The Gulf of Piran or Piran Bay (Slovene: Piranski zaliv, Croatian: Piranski zaljev or Savudrijska vala, Italian: Baia di Pirano) is located in the northern part of the Adriatic Sea, and is a part of the southernmost tip of the Gulf of Trieste.

== Overview ==
It was named after the town of Piran, and its shores are shared by Croatia and Slovenia. It is delimited by a line connecting Cape Savudrija (Savudrijski rt) in the south to the Cape Madona (Rt Madona) in the north and measures around 19 square kilometres (7.3 sq mi).

On the eastern Slovenian coast lies the town of Piran, and the settlements Portorož and Lucija. On the southern Croatian coast are tourist camps of Crveni Vrh and Kanegra, built in the 1980s. The main river flowing into the gulf is the Dragonja, whose mouth is on the border. Along the mouth of the Dragonja lie the Sečovlje saltpans, covering an area of 650 hectares (1,600 acres).

The Gulf area has been a theatre of a maritime and land border dispute between Slovenia and Croatia.
