= 2010 Slovenian border dispute agreement referendum =

- 6 June 2010
- Do you support the implementation of the Law on the Ratification of the Arbitration Agreement between the Government of the Republic of Slovenia and the Government of the Republic of Croatia, which was adopted by the Slovenian Parliament at its session of 19 April 2010, becoming valid?

Results
Choice	Votes	%
Yes	371,848	51.54%
No	349,595	48.46%
Valid votes	721,443	99.24%
Invalid or blank votes	5,544	0.76%
Total votes	726,987	100.00%
Registered voters/turnout	1,705,105	42.64%

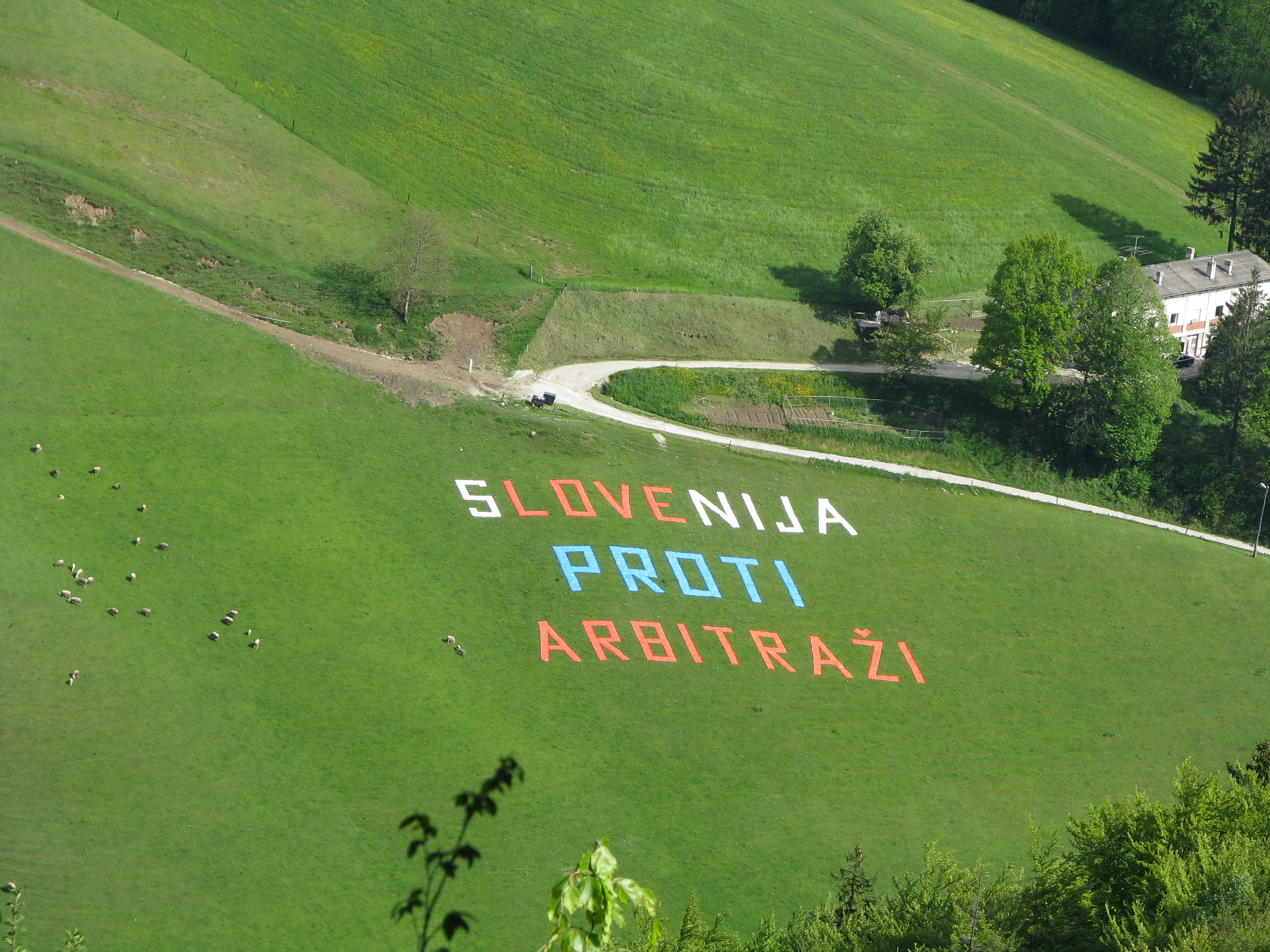
"Slovenia against the Arbitration" inscription installed on the former Minister of Agriculture’s pasture

A referendum on resolving the border dispute with Croatia was held in Slovenia on 6 June 2010. Voters were asked whether the dispute should be brought before an international arbitration tribunal. The results showed 51.54% of voters in favour, with a voter turnout of 42.66%.

== Background ==
The referendum was officially requested in parliament on 26 April 2010, with the date for the election to be decided within seven days, i.e. by 3 May 2010. The election was called in the evening on 3 May 2010 for 6 June 2010 as had been expected.

The official wording was:

Do you support the implementation of the Law on the Ratification of the Arbitration Agreement between the Government of the Republic of Slovenia and the Government of the Republic of Croatia, which was adopted by the Slovenian Parliament at its session of 19 April 2010, becoming valid?

== Polling ==
Before the referendum, polls constantly showed a majority of the population in favour of the agreement:

- November 2009: 49% to 37% in favour
- January 2010: 64% to 28% in favour
- March 2010: 50% to 30% in favour
- Early May 2010: 37.6% to 32.9% in favour
- Late May 2010: 50.7% to 36.1% in favour
- Late May 2010: 37.6% to 37.0% against
- Early June 2010: 54% to 46% in favour
- Early June 2010: 56.8% to 43.2% in favour

== Results ==
Choice	Votes	%
For	371,848	51.54
Against	349,595	48.46
Total	721,443	100.00
Valid votes	721,443	99.24
Invalid/blank votes	5,544	0.76
Total votes	726,987	100.00
Registered voters/turnout	1,705,105	42.64
Source: IFES

== See also ==
- Croatia–Slovenia border disputes
- Croatia–Slovenia relations
