= Exclusive economic zone of Croatia =

Protected fishing area in the Adriatic Sea

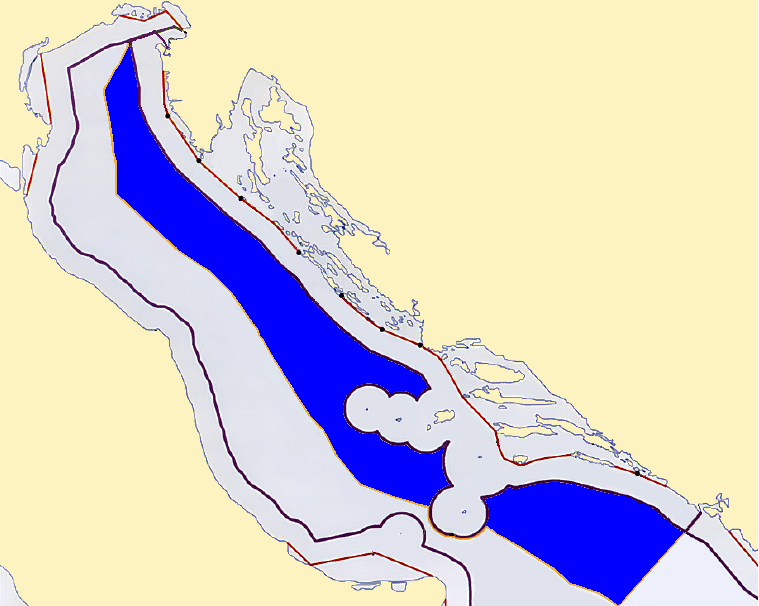
Croatian Exclusive Economic Zone in the Adriatic Sea

The exclusive economic zone of Croatia (Croatian: isključivi gospodarski pojas, IGP) is a protected fishing area spanning 23,870 square kilometres of the Croatian half of Adriatic Sea.

== Background ==
The Croatian Peasant Party, then a member of Croatia's governing coalition, first proclaimed and initiated the process of designating the exclusive economic zone (EEZ) as an Ecological and Fisheries Protection Zone (Croatian: Zaštićeni ekološko-ribolovni pojas, ZERP). The Ivica Račan administration proposed it to the Croatian Parliament, which voted in favour on 3 October 2003. It came into effect exactly one year later, with the EEZ excluding European Union member states. The government informed the United Nations Secretariat of the decision prior to the 2004 enactment of the zone. On 1 January 2008, the zone came into full effect as with its borders being enforced.

The zone's exact boundaries date back to treaties between the former Socialist Federal Republic of Yugoslavia and Italy in 1968, and between Croatia and the Federal Republic of Yugoslavia in 2001. Prior to the declaring the ZERP an EEZ, Italian ships annually caught €300 million' worth of fish from the zone—ten times the amount which Croatian ships caught. In its enactment of the zone, the Croatian government also cited the danger of environmental disasters like the Prestige oil spill being repeated on the Croatian Adriatic, which would seriously affect the country's tourism industry.

The EEZ has widespread support in Croatia. All major political parties support the zone, including the Social Democratic Party, Croatian Peasant Party, and Democratic Centre. The Croatian Democratic Union has been a cautious supporter and remains wary of the EU's response.

== International relations ==
In 2008, Luigi Giannini, leader of Italian fishermen's organisation Federcoopesca, declared that one-third of all Italian fishing activity took place in the ZERP.

On 10 March 2008, the Croatian government, led by the HDZ party, decided not to enforce ZERP for EU members from 15 March 2008 onward.

In 2011, during negotiations with the European Union, it was decided that Croatia could proclaim an ecological protection zone for countries that are not EU member states. Slovenian fishermen catch about 40% of their fish in the EEZ.

On 5 February 2021, the Croatian Parliament unanimously declared the area an EEZ after consultations with Italy and Slovenia, after it became known that Italy was planning to create an EEZ in its part of the Adriatic Sea.

== Enforcement ==
On 3 January 2008, the Croatian Navy intercepted an Italian boat that had passed through the EEZ and was in Croatian territorial waters. The fishing boat was escorted to Vis by a navy warship and the three fishermen were arrested.

On 6 February 2008, the Turkish cargo ship UND Adriyatik caught fire just outside the EEZ. According to Croatian media, this was seen as a test for the ZERP.

On 26 May 2021, the maritime police from Split intercepted an Italian fishing vessel with two Italians onboard. They were charged of illegally crossing the border and fishing without privileges within the territorial sea of the Republic of Croatia. On the fishing boat, the police officers found and seized six caches with 20.4 kilogrammes of various types of fish.

== See also ==
- Exclusive economic zone of Italy
