= Province of Trieste =

Province of Italy

Coordinates: 45°38′10″N 13°48′15″E

Province of Trieste Provincia di Trieste (Italian) Tržaška pokrajina (Slovene) Provincie di Triest (Friulian)
- Province
- Regional Decentralization Entity of Trieste; Ente di decentramento regionale di Trieste (Italian)
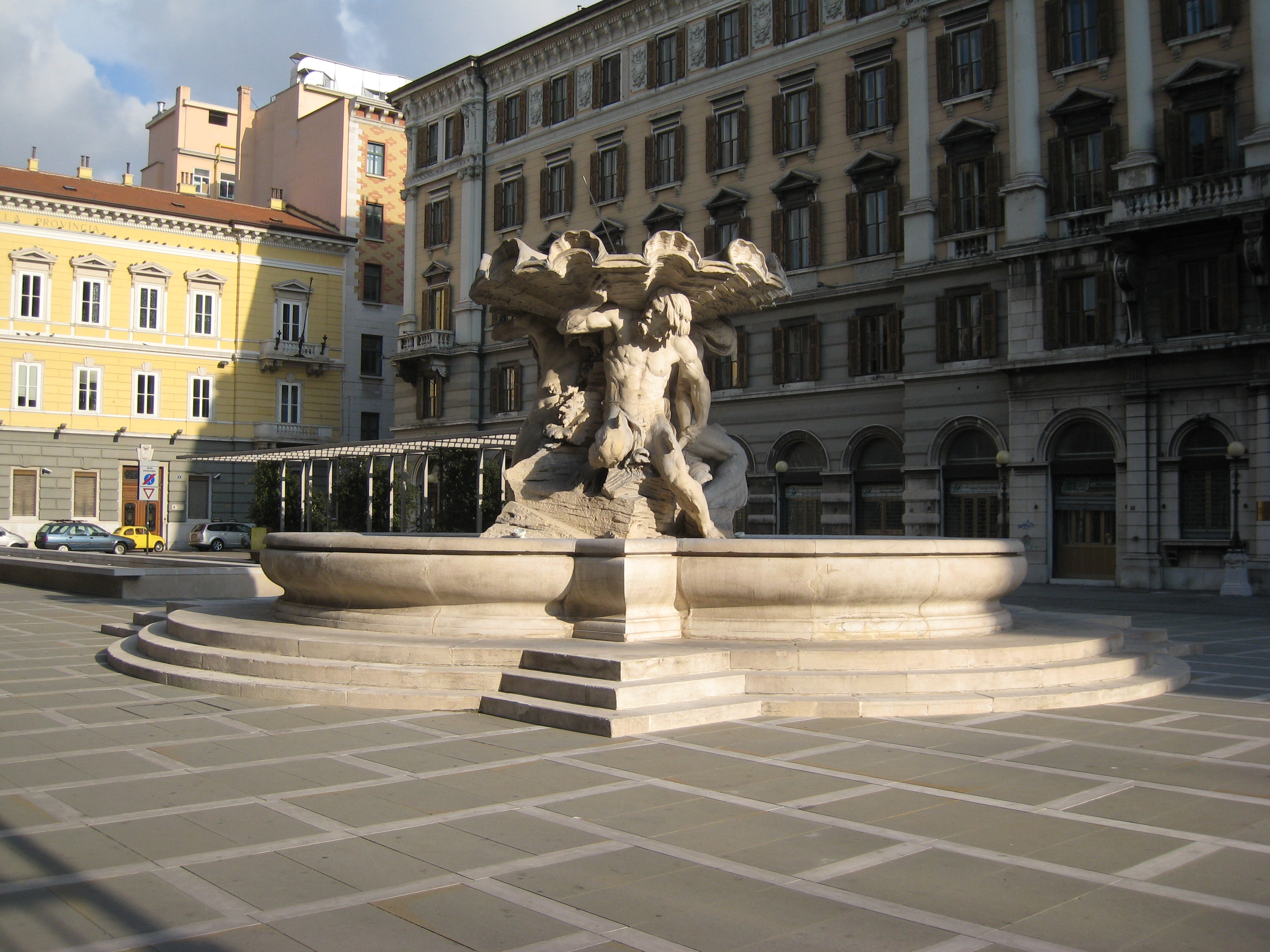
- Piazza Vittorio Veneto in Trieste, housing the provincial seat in the palace at left

- Coat of arms

- Map highlighting the location of the province of Trieste in Italy
- Country: Italy
- Region: Friuli-Venezia Giulia
- Established: 1920
- Disestablished: 30 September 2017
- Capital(s): Trieste
- Municipalities: 6

Government
  - General director: Roberta Clericuzio

Area
  - Total: 212.51 km^{2} (82.05 sq mi)

Population (2026)
  - Total: 227,840
  - Density: 1,072.1/km^{2} (2,776.8/sq mi)

GDP
  - Total: €7.886 billion (2015)
  - Per capita: €33,490 (2015)
- Time zone: UTC+1 (CET)
  - Summer (DST): UTC+2 (CEST)
- Postal code: 34121-34151 (Trieste); 34010-34018 (surroundings)
- Telephone prefix: 040
- ISO 3166 code: IT-TS
- Vehicle registration: TS
- ISTAT code: 032

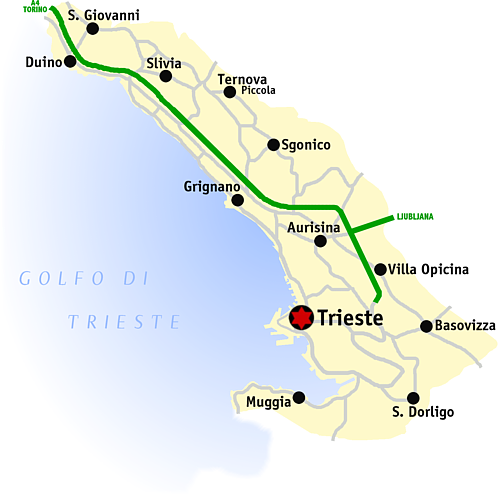
Map of the province of Trieste

The province of Trieste (Italian: provincia di Trieste) is a province in the autonomous Friuli-Venezia Giulia region of Italy. Its capital is the city of Trieste. It has a population of 227,840 in an area of 212.51 square kilometres (82.05 mi^{2}) across its 6 municipalities. It has a coastal length of 48.1 kilometres (29.9 mi). Abolished in 2017, it was reestablished in 2019 as the regional decentralization entity of Trieste (Italian: ente di decentramento regionale di Trieste; Slovene: enota deželne decentralizacije Trst; Friulian: ent di decentrament regjonâl di Triest), and was reactivated on 1 July 2020.

It is the smallest province in Italy by number of municipalities, as well as area, and its land area is much smaller than large Italian cities.

== History ==
=== Early history ===
After the dissolution of the Western Roman Empire, the area of the province of Trieste was ruled by the Ostrogoths, Eastern Romans (Byzantines), Lombards and by the Franks. With the advent of the Habsburgs (13th century) the territory was divided between the lords of Duino, Trieste, San Dorligo della Valle and Muggia. During the reign of Maria Theresa of Austria and, subsequently, Joseph II, the maritime trades were increased with institution of the free port.

In 1809, the area was ceded to France after the defeat of Austria in that year. After the French definitive defeat, the communes of Duino, Aurisina, Sgonico and Monrupino, which used to be part of Carniola, were annexed to that of Gorizia and Gradisca, while Trieste became a direct city of the Austrian Empire. San Dorligo della Valle and Muggia became part of Istria.

World War I left the territory of the province almost untouched, although fierce battles were fought just on its north-westernmost edges.

The whole area was occupied by Italy in November 1918, in the aftermath of Austria's defeat in World War I. It was officially annexed to Italy with the treaty of Rapallo of 1920, which also assigned all of the former Austrian Littoral to Italy.

=== Establishment ===
The Province of Trieste was first established in 1920. It comprised the territory of the province at the time of its abolition, as well as significant portions of the Karst Plateau and the region of Inner Carniola in present-day Slovenia. Between 1923 and 1943, the province of Trieste included also the communes of Monfalcone, Staranzano, Ronchi dei Legionari, San Canzian d'Isonzo, Turriaco, San Pier d'Isonzo, Fogliano Redipuglia and Grado (today in province of Gorizia), the current Slovenian municipalities of Sežana (including former communes of Dutovlje, Tomaj and Lokev), Divača (including former communes of Senožeče and Vremski Britof), Postojna (shortly Postumia before 1945; including former communes of Bukovje, Hrenovice and Slavina) and Pivka (including former communes of Šmihel and Košana), as well as some settlements in the present-day Slovenian municipality of Koper, namely Hrvatini, Elerji, Spodnje Škofije, Plavje and Osp.

=== After World War II ===
After the end of World War II, the Free Territory of Trieste was established as a free state on 15 September 1947. On 26 October 1954, Italy and Yugoslavia came to an understanding whereby the territory de facto was divided between the two states. Zone A of the free state became the new Province of Trieste and Zone B was to be administered by Yugoslavia. The Province of Trieste formally became a part of Italy on 11 October 1977, by the Treaty of Osimo.

The province was abolished on 30 September 2017. Two years later, it was restored in the form of a regional decentralization entity.

== Government ==
=== Municipalities ===
Map of all the Comuni in the province of Trieste, region Friuli-Venezia Giulia, Italy

The province has 6 municipalities (comuni).

ISTAT Code	Italian name	Slovenian name	Population (2026)	Area (km^{2})	Density	Map
32001	Duino-Aurisina	Devin-Nabrežina	8,185	45.31	180.6	
32002	Monrupino	Repentabor	836	12.61	66.3	
32003	Muggia	Milje	12,627	13.85	911.7	
32004	San Dorligo della Valle	Dolina	5,622	24.22	232.1	
32005	Sgonico	Zgonik	1,948	31.40	62.0	
32006	Trieste	Trst	198,622	85.11	2,333.7	

== Demographics ==
Historical population
Year	Pop.	±%
1921	262,203	—
1931	273,676	+4.4%
1936	271,689	−0.7%
1951	297,003	+9.3%
1961	298,645	+0.6%
1971	300,304	+0.6%
1981	283,641	−5.5%
1991	261,825	−7.7%
2001	242,235	−7.5%
2011	232,601	−4.0%
2021	228,833	−1.6%
Source: ISTAT

As of 2026, the population is 227,840, of which 48.4% are male, and 51.6% are female. Minors make up 12.7% of the population, and seniors make up 29.1%.

Italian is spoken within the whole province. In the city of Trieste, many people speak Triestine, a dialect of Venetian. Tergestine, an archaic dialect of Friulian, was spoken in Trieste and in Muggia, but became completely extinct by the mid-19th century.

An estimated 8% of the province's population (25,000 out of 260,000 from the last 1971 census) belongs to the Slovene ethnic community. Italian legislation recognizes and protects the Slovene linguistic minority in all six municipalities of the province, although visual bilingualism is not applied in the city centre of Trieste and in the town of Muggia. In addition to standard Slovene, which is taught in Slovene-language schools, three different Slovene dialects are spoken in the Province of Trieste. The Karst dialect is spoken in the municipalities of Duino-Aurisina and Sgonico, as well as in several settlements in the municipality of Trieste: Barcola, Prosecco, and Contovello. The Inner Carniolan dialect is spoken in the municipality of Monrupino and in several settlements of the municipality of Trieste, namely Opicina, Trebiciano, Padriciano, and Basovizza. The Istrian dialect is spoken in the municipalities of San Dorligo della Valle and in the rural areas of Muggia, as well as in the southern suburbs of Trieste (most notably in Servola).

=== Immigration ===
As of 2025, immigrants make up 16.5% of the population. The 5 largest foreign countries of birth are Serbia, Croatia, Romania, Kosovo, and Ukraine.

Foreign population by country of birth (2025)
Country of birth	Population
Serbia	5,270
Croatia	2,696
Romania	2,631
Kosovo	2,249
Ukraine	1,662
Slovenia	1,615
Albania	1,394
Pakistan	1,288
Bosnia and Herzegovina	1,087
China	816
North Macedonia	782
Moldova	771
Argentina	645
Russia	622
Colombia	612

== Points of interest ==
- Piazza Unità d'Italia (Unity of Italy Square)
- Canal Grande
- Giardino Botanico Carsiana
- Val Rosandra
- Grotta Gigante
- Duino Castle
- Miramare Castle
- Rilke trail
- Sistiana Bay
- Timavo sources
- Fortified church in Monrupino

== See also ==
- List of governors of the Province of Trieste – for a list of governors of the province from 1918 to 1954
- Venezia Giulia
- Free Territory of Trieste
- Villa Opicina
