= Karst Plateau =

Plateau region across southwestern Slovenia and northeastern Italy

Coordinates: 45°42′N 13°52′E

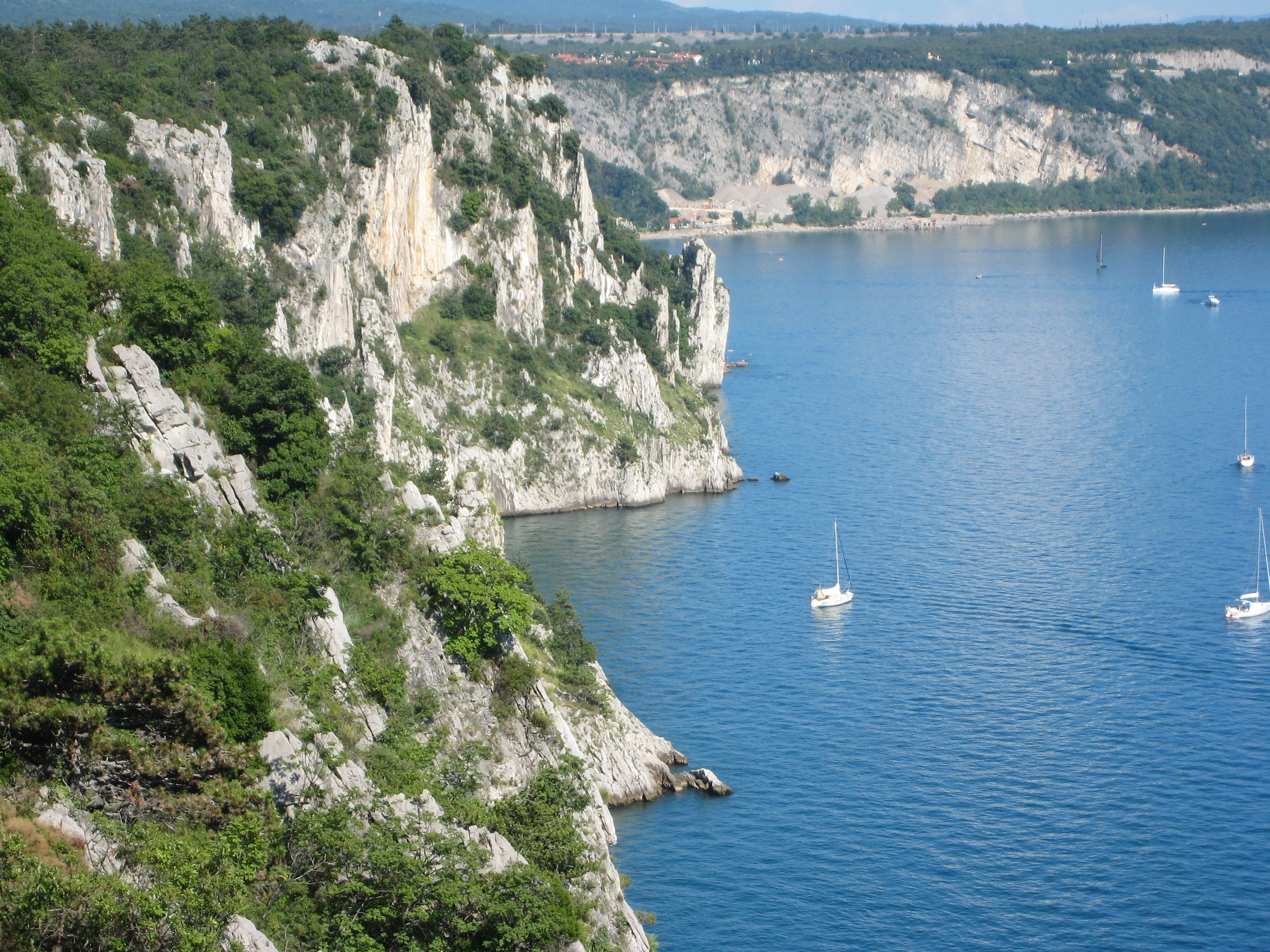
The cliffs of Duino and the gulf of Sistiana, Province of Trieste, Italy, seen from the Rilke Trail

The Karst Plateau or the Karst region (Slovene: Kras, Italian: Carso), also locally called Karst, is a karst plateau region extending across the border of southwestern Slovenia and northeastern Italy.

It lies between the Vipava Valley, the low hills surrounding the valley, the westernmost part of the Brkini Hills, northern Istria, and the Gulf of Trieste. The western edge of the plateau also marks the traditional ethnic border between Italians and Slovenes. The region gave its name to karst topography. For this reason, it is also referred to as the Classical Karst.

== Geographical position ==
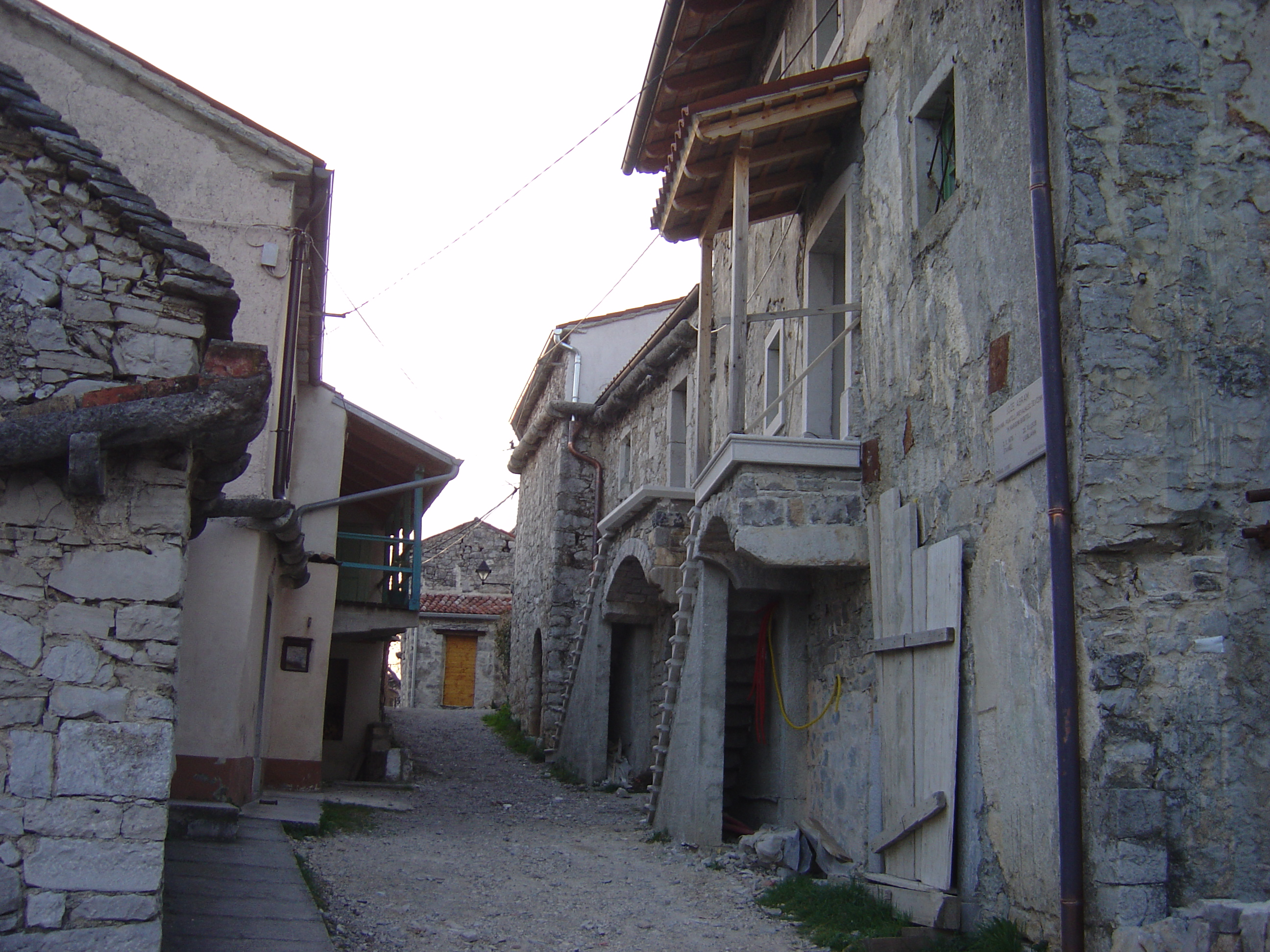
Typical rural Karst houses in Štanjel (Municipality of Komen), Slovenia

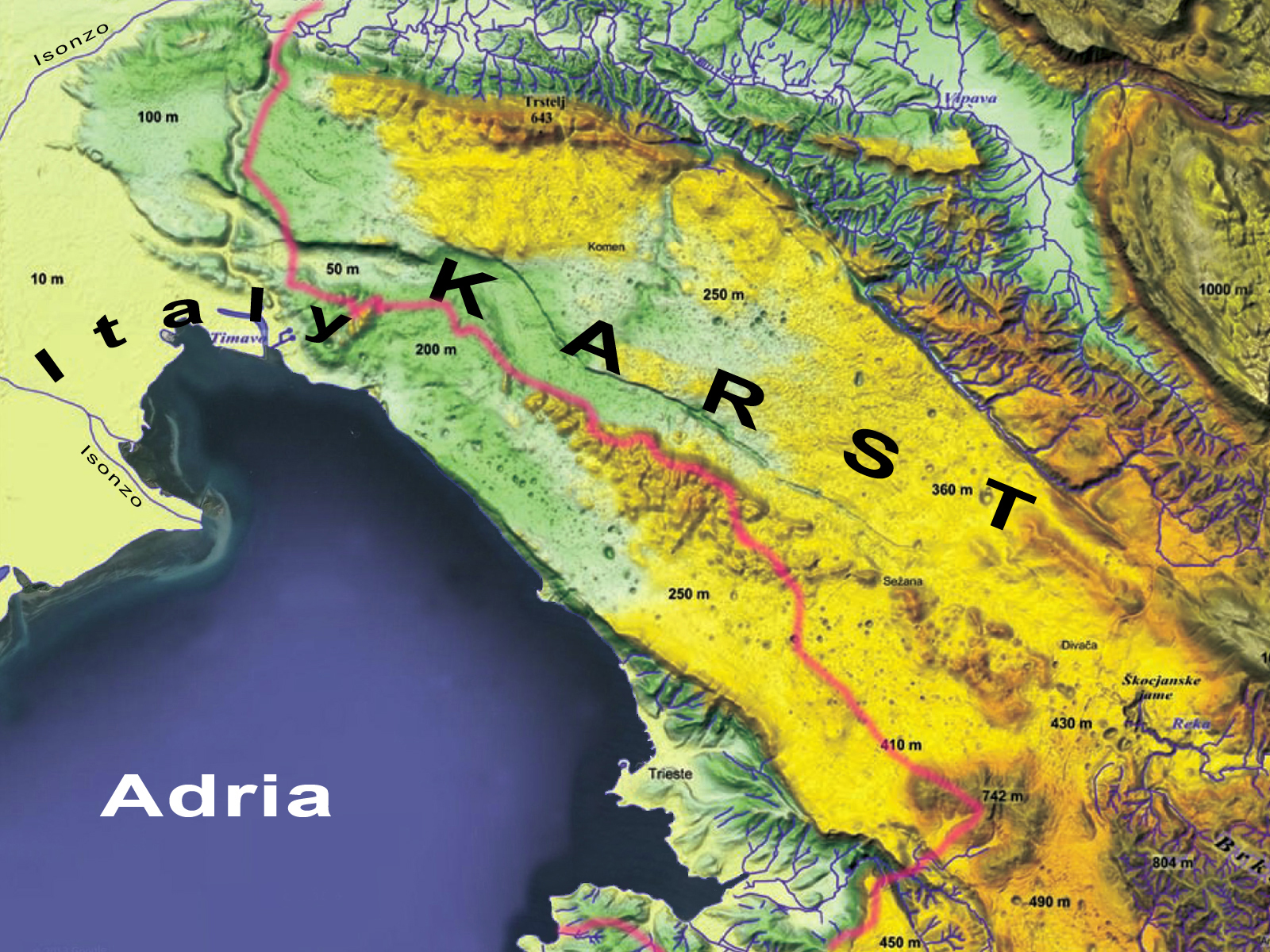
Approximate extent of the Karst region

The plateau rises quite steeply above the neighboring landscape, except for its northeastern side, where the steepness is less pronounced. The plateau gradually descends from the southeast to the southwest. On average it lies 334 m above sea level. Its western edge, known as the Karst Rim (Slovene: Kraški rob), is a continuation of the Učka mountain range in eastern Istria, and rises to the east and southeast of Trieste, ending in steep cliffs between Aurisina and Duino. Many interesting geological phenomena occur along the Karst Rim, including the picturesque Rosandra Valley (also known as Glinščica).

Because the Karst steeply descends towards the Adriatic Sea, it is less exposed to the beneficial climatological effects of the Mediterranean. In the past, the main vegetation on the plateau was oaks, but these were replaced by pine forests in the 19th and 20th centuries. Forests now cover only one third of the Karst. Starting in the Middle Ages, the plateau suffered radical deforestation for economic reasons. Although it is often said that much of the wood for the closely spaced piles that support the island city of Venice came from this region, this is unlikely. Venice perhaps used the wood for naval timber. The most radical deforestation occurred in the first half of the nineteenth century due to clear-cutting by local farmers and conversion of the land into pastures for goats and sheep.

The Karst is famous for its caves. In Slovenia, they include Vilenica Cave (the oldest show cave in Europe), Lipica Cave, Divača Cave, Kačna Cave, Postojna Cave, and Škocjan Caves (a UNESCO World Heritage Site), and Grotta Gigante in Italy (the largest show cave in the world).

Most of the Karst is located in the Slovenian Littoral, covering an area of 429 square kilometres, with a population of about 19,000 people. The Karst as a whole has exactly 100 settlements. The town of Sežana is the center of the region on the Slovene side of the border. The main rural centers are the settlements of Divača, Dutovlje, and Komen. Štanjel is a picturesque clustered settlement at the top of the northern rim of the plateau; its houses are tightly clustered around Turn Hill, giving it the appearance of a medieval town. On the Italian side of the border, important settlements include Opicina, Duino, and Aurisina.

Natural conditions, including the bora (Slovene: burja) wind, and the local way of life all shaped the elements of Karst architecture, creating simple but well-defined forms. One of the main tourist centers in the area is Lipica, with its stud farm (the home of the Lipizzan horse breed) and other tourist facilities.

== Language, culture and traditions ==
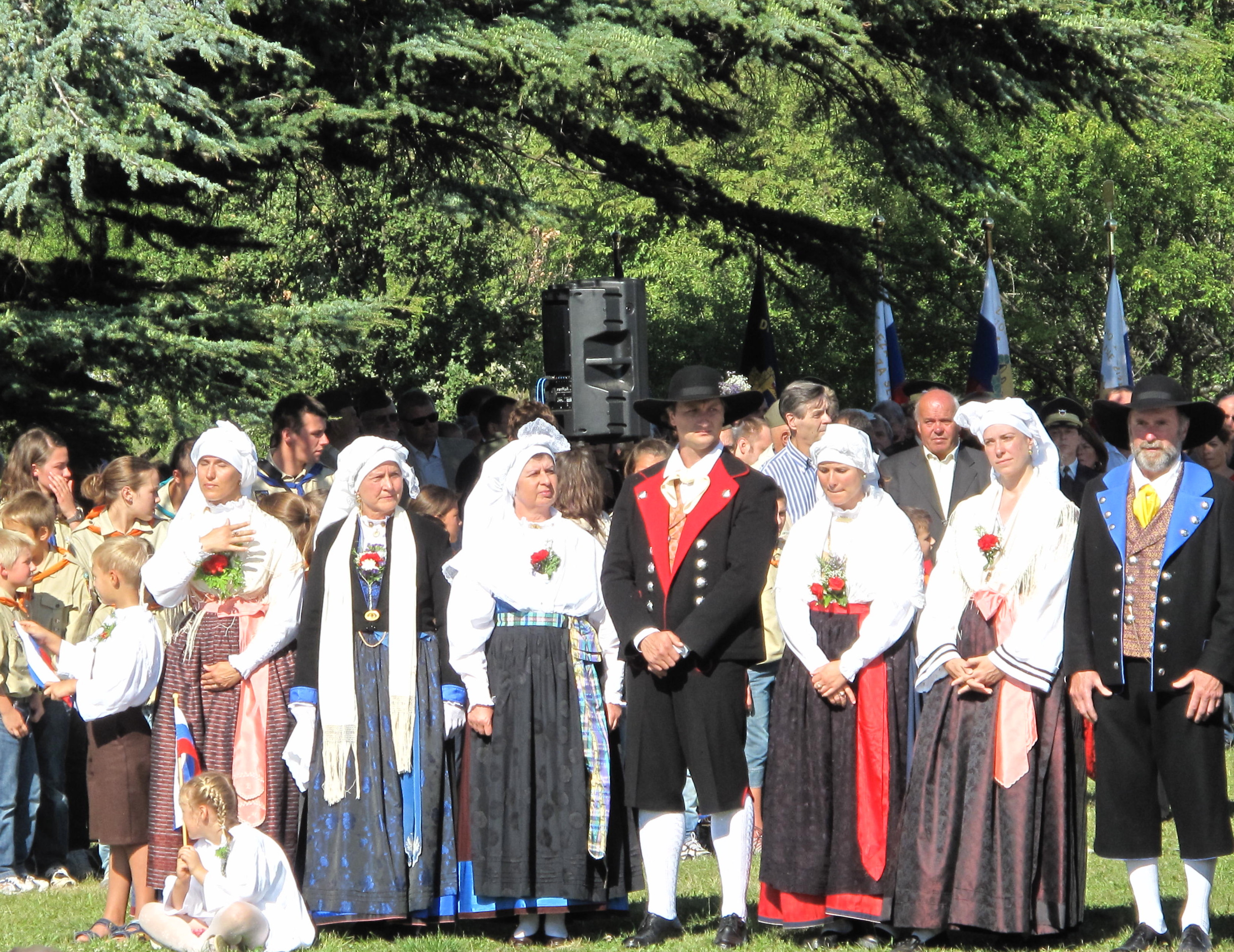
Traditional Karst folk costumes in a Slovenian commemorative celebration in Basovizza near Trieste

The vast majority of the inhabitants of the Karst Plateau are ethnic Slovenes. Traditionally, only the villages of San Martino del Carso and Poggio-Sdraussina (in the municipality of Sagrado) has been inhabited by Friulian speakers, the villages of Polazzo (in the municipality of Fogliano-Redipuglia), Vermegliano and Selz (in the municipality of Ronchi dei Legionari) by Venetian speakers, and the town of Duino has been inhabited for long by a mixed population, while all the rest of the region was almost entirely Slovene-speaking from the Middle Ages until the end of World War I, after which some thousands Italians moved in the region while it was entirely under Italy's sovereignty, and again from the late 1940s and during the 1950s, when Istrian Italians fleeing from Yugoslavia were settled in Karst villages in the Province of Trieste, especially in the municipality of Duino. As a consequence, today an estimated one fifth of the population of the Karst Plateau is Italian speaking, while the rest is mostly Slovene speaking.

The Slovenes in the region speak two closely related Slovene dialects, both belonging to the Littoral dialect group. In the southern part of the plateau (in the municipalities of Divača and Hrpelje-Kozina, and the southern part of the Municipality of Sežana, in the Italian municipality of Monrupino, and in most of the Slovene-speaking areas of the municipality of Trieste), the Inner Carniolan dialect is spoken. In the northern part (the northern part of the Municipality of Sežana, in the Slovenian municipalities of Komen and Miren-Kostanjevica, in the Italian municipalities of Sgonico, Duino-Aurisina and Doberdò del Lago, as well in some eastern suburbs of Trieste, like Barcola), the Karst dialect is spoken.

The Karst is renowned for its strong red wine, known as teran, prosciutto and its traditional cuisine, which is a mixture of Mediterranean and Central European cuisine. The traditionally produced Karst prosciutto, a sort of dry-cured ham, is protected at the European level.

== Prominent natives and residents ==
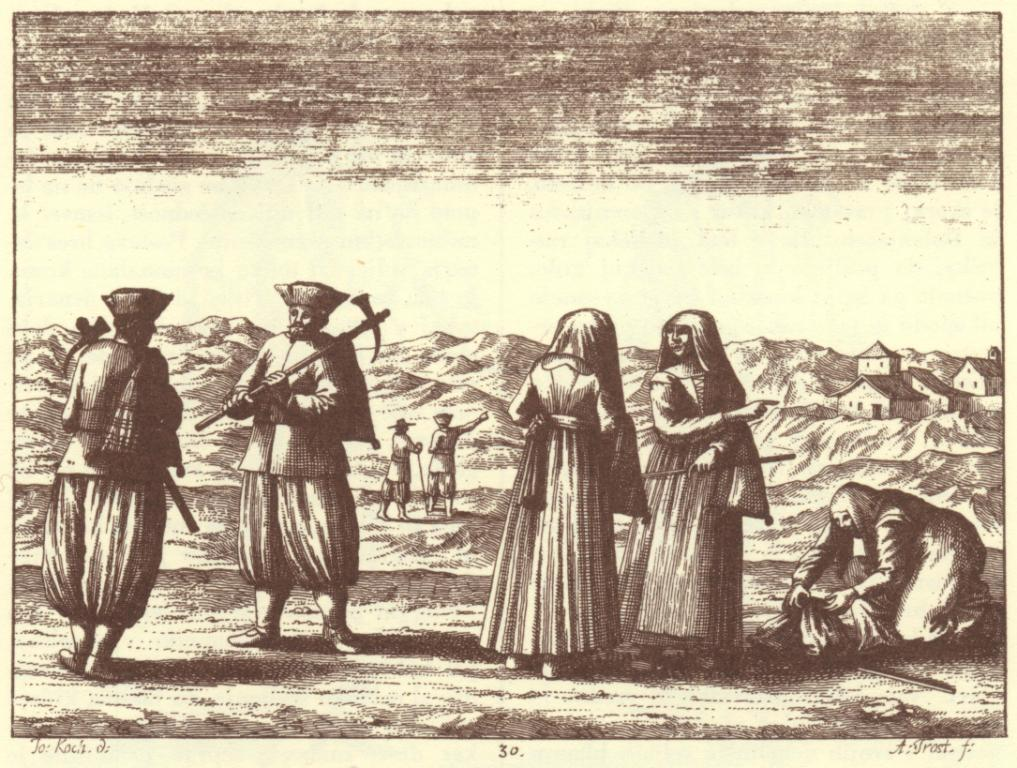
Karst peasants in an engraving from Johann Weikhard von Valvasor's work The Glory of the Duchy of Carniola, 17th century

Prominent persons that were born or lived in this region include the poets Srečko Kosovel, Igo Gruden, Ciril Zlobec, and Branka Jurca, social activist Danilo Dolci, architect Max Fabiani, painters Avgust Černigoj and Lojze Spacal, writers Alojz Rebula, Igor Torkar, and Bogomir Magajna, theologian Anton Mahnič, politicians Drago Marušič, Josip Ferfolja, and Majda Širca, economist Milko Brezigar, and actress Ita Rina. The picturesque Karst landscape inspired numerous artists who were not from this region, including the poets Rainer Maria Rilke, Alojz Gradnik, and Edvard Kocbek, essayists Scipio Slataper and Marjan Rožanc, writers Italo Svevo, Fulvio Tomizza, and Susanna Tamaro, and film director Jan Cvitkovič. Many artists and authors settled in the area, including Josip Osti and Taras Kermauner.

== Geographical extension ==
Municipalities that are completely or partially in the Karst include:

- Italy
  - Savogna d'Isonzo (Slovene: Sovodnje ob Soči) (partially)
  - Doberdò del Lago (Slovene: Doberdob)
  - Sagrado (Slovene: Zagraj) (partially)
  - Fogliano Redipuglia (Slovene: Foljan-Sredipolje) (partially)
  - Ronchi dei Legionari (Slovene: Ronke) (partially)
  - Monfalcone (Slovene: Tržič) (partially)
  - Duino-Aurisina (Slovene: Devin-Nabrežina)
  - Sgonico (Slovene: Zgonik)
  - Monrupino (Slovene: Repentabor)
  - Trieste (Slovene: Trst) (partially)
  - San Dorligo della Valle (Slovene: Dolina) (partially)
- Slovenia
  - Miren-Kostanjevica (partially)
  - Komen
  - Sežana
  - Divača
  - Hrpelje-Kozina (partially)

Historically, the region around Pivka, Postojna and Ilirska Bistrica also used to be considered as part of the Karst. This subregional identity is still documented in the late 17th century, but it weakened in the later period, replaced by an Inner Carniolan identity.

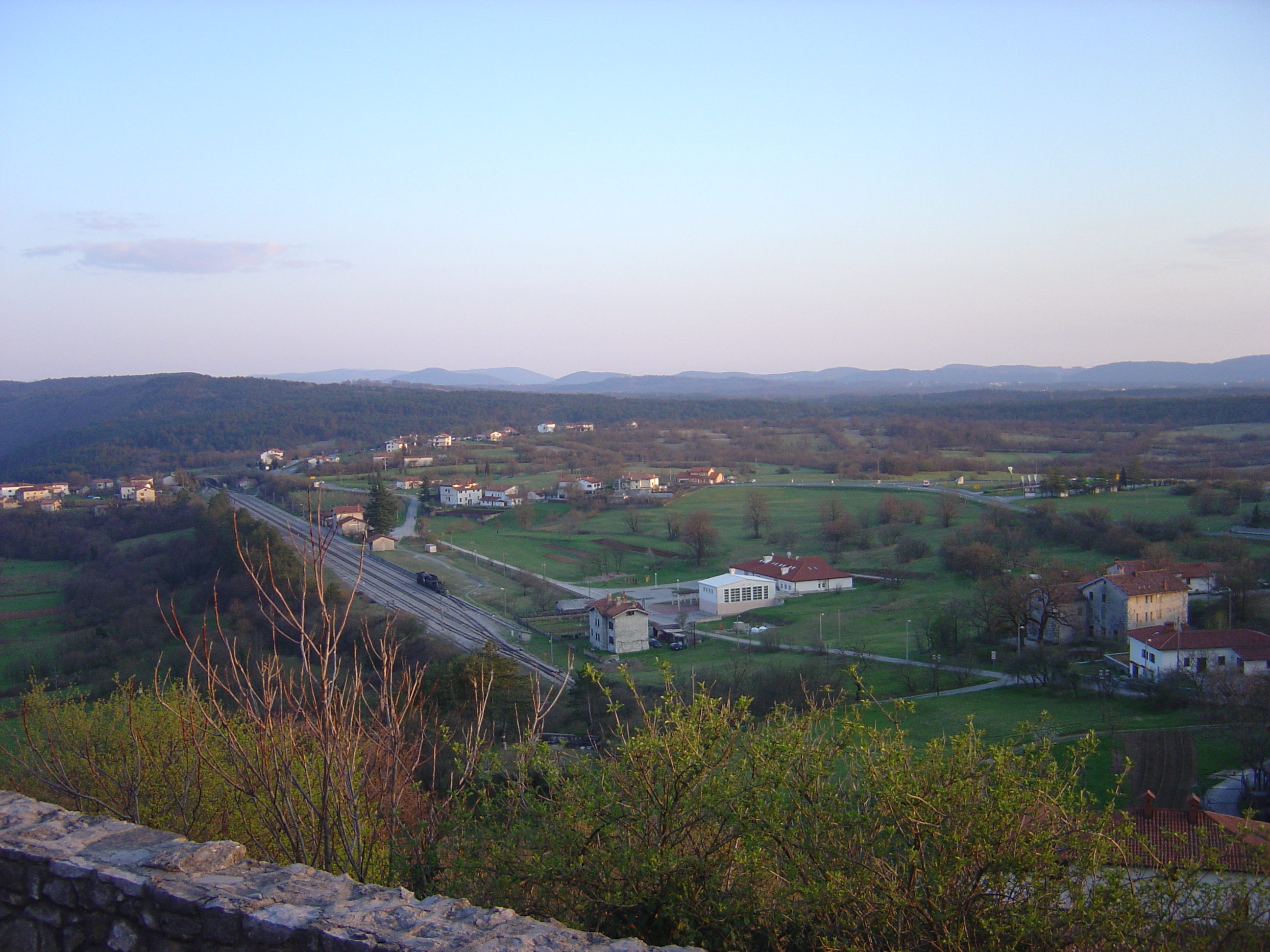
The Karst landscape as viewed from Štanjel

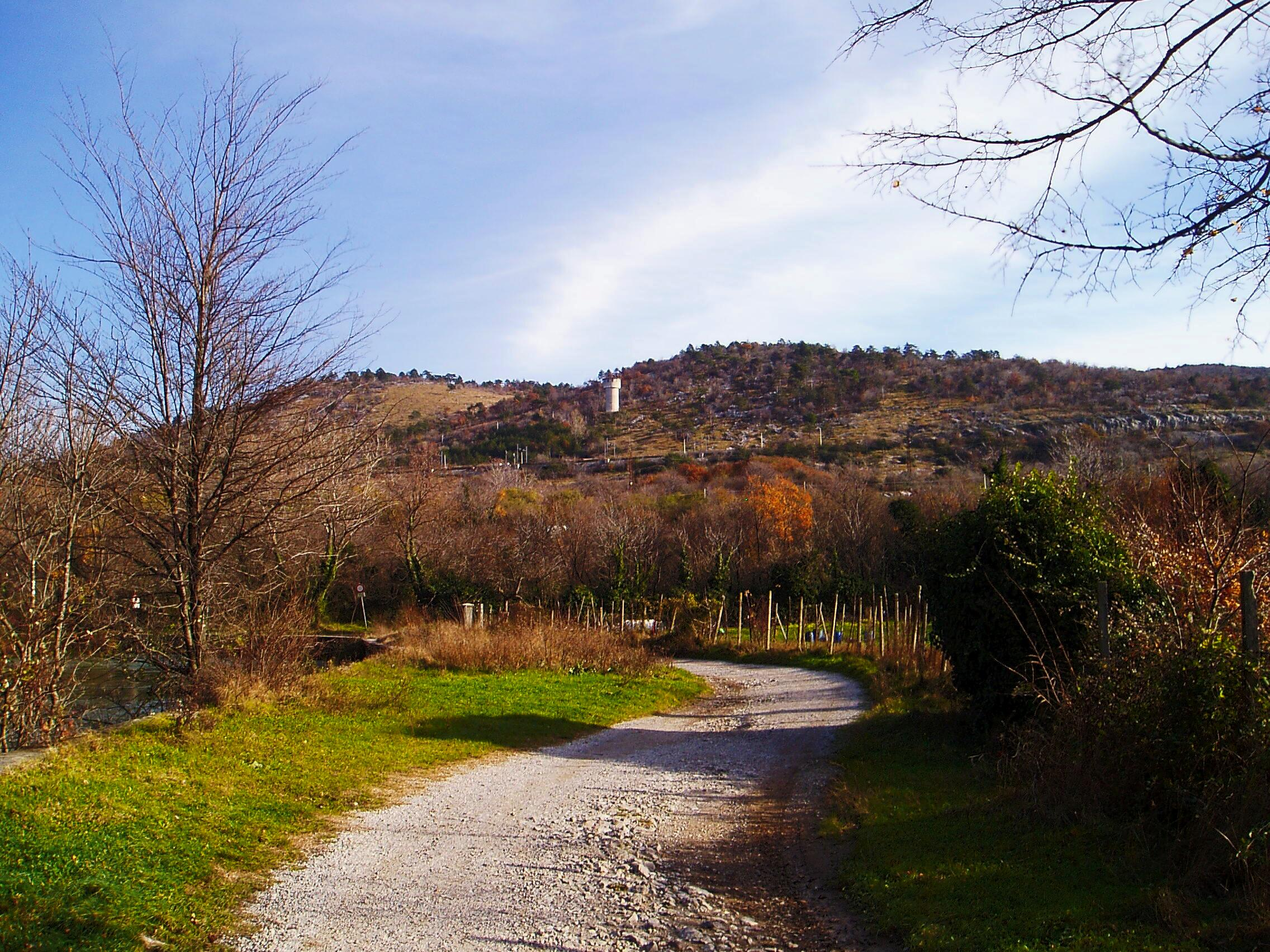
Landscape near Duino

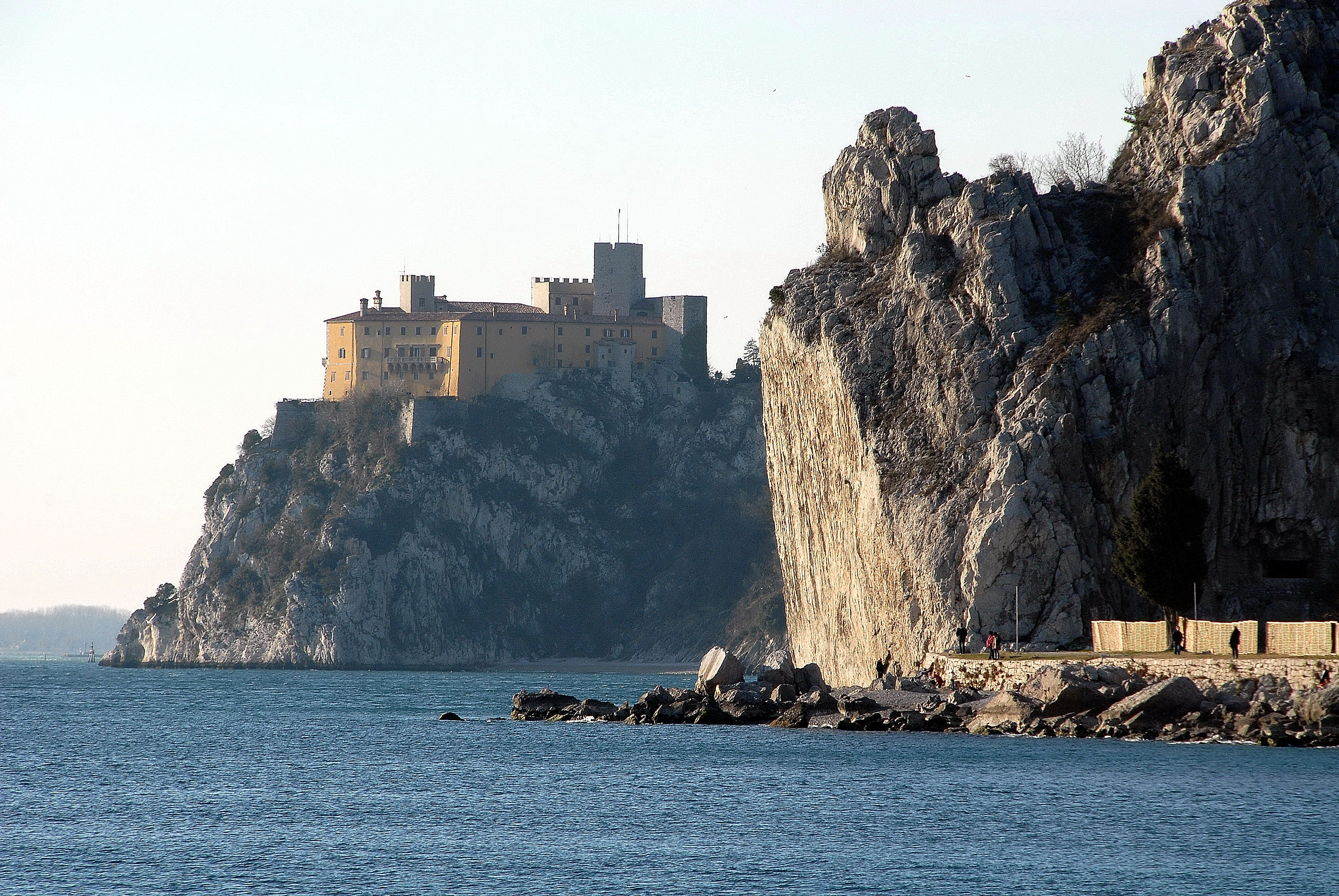
The cliffs of Duino

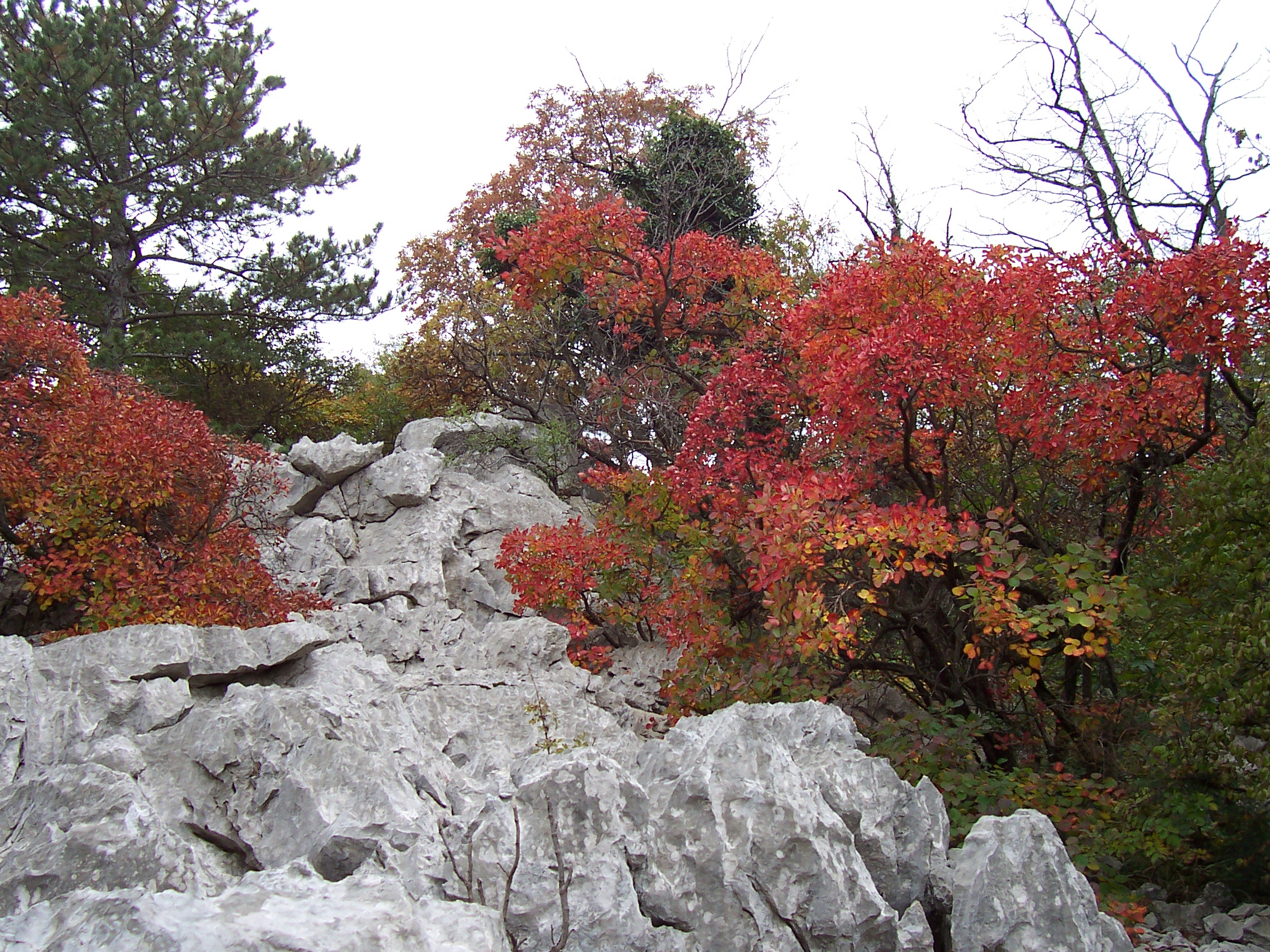
Karst landscape in the Province of Trieste

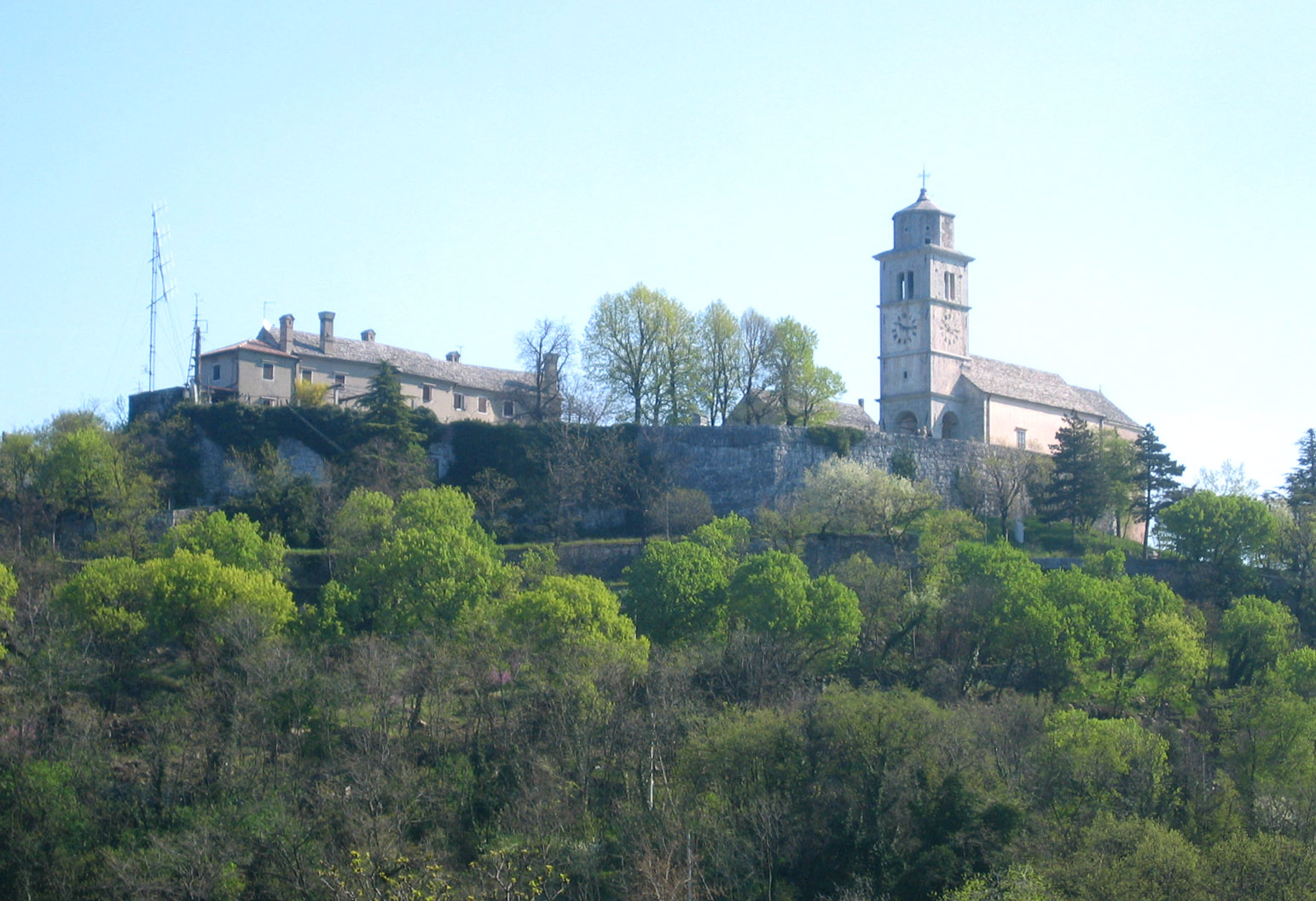
The fortified church in Monrupino

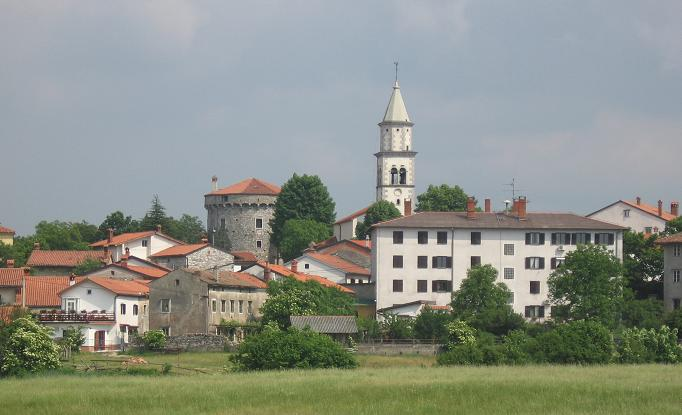
The village of Lokev near Sežana

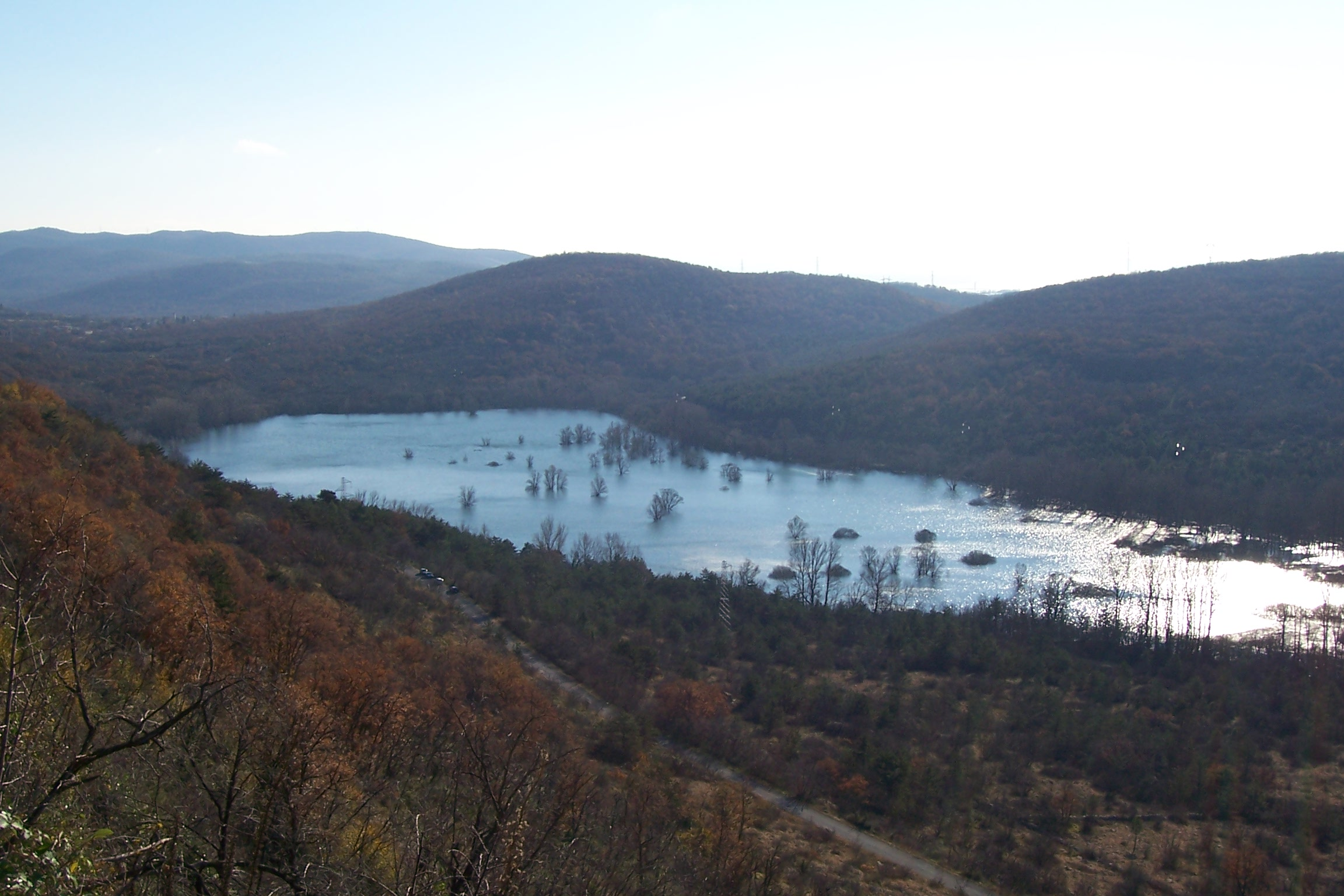
Lake Doberdò

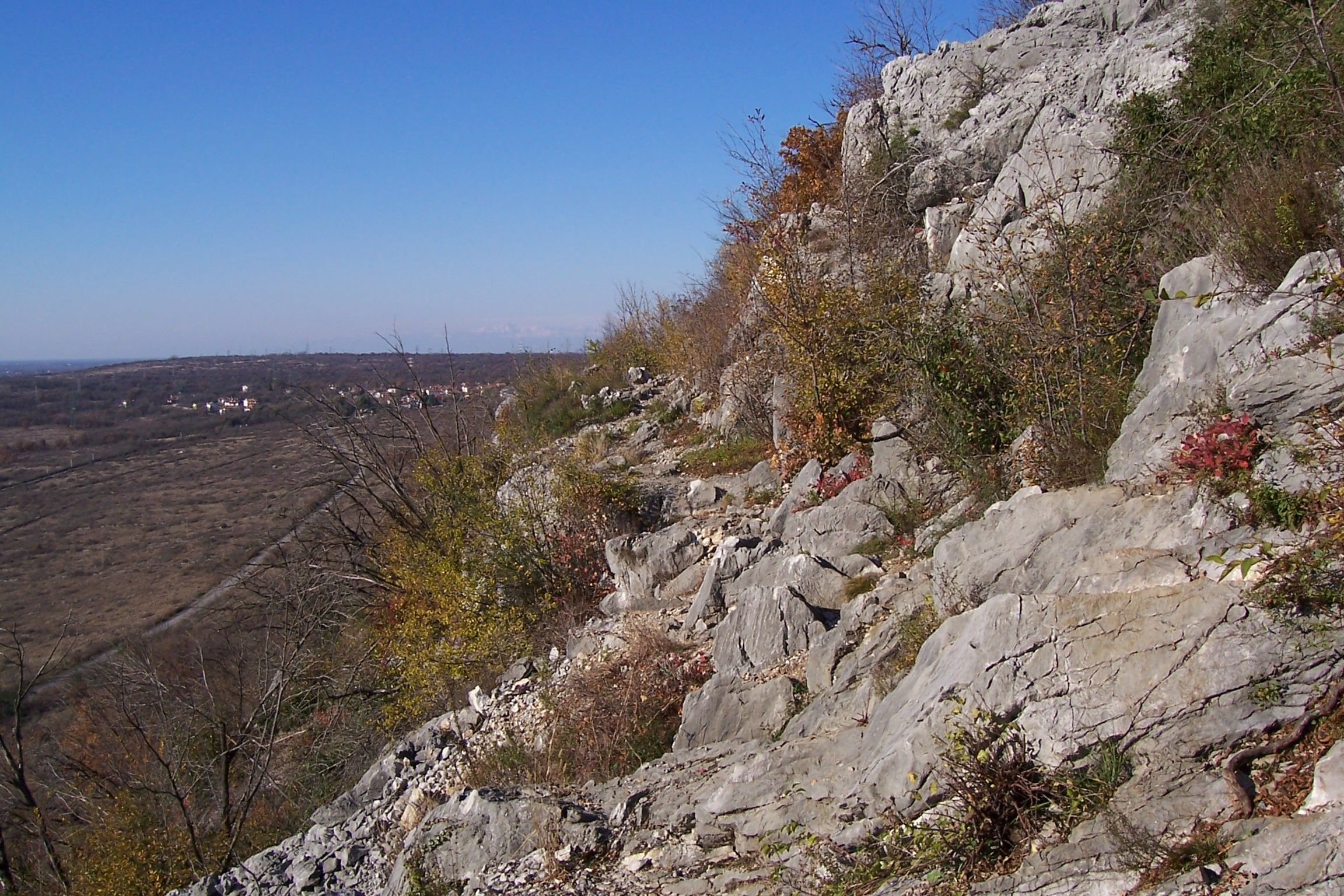
Karst landscape near Doberdò del Lago

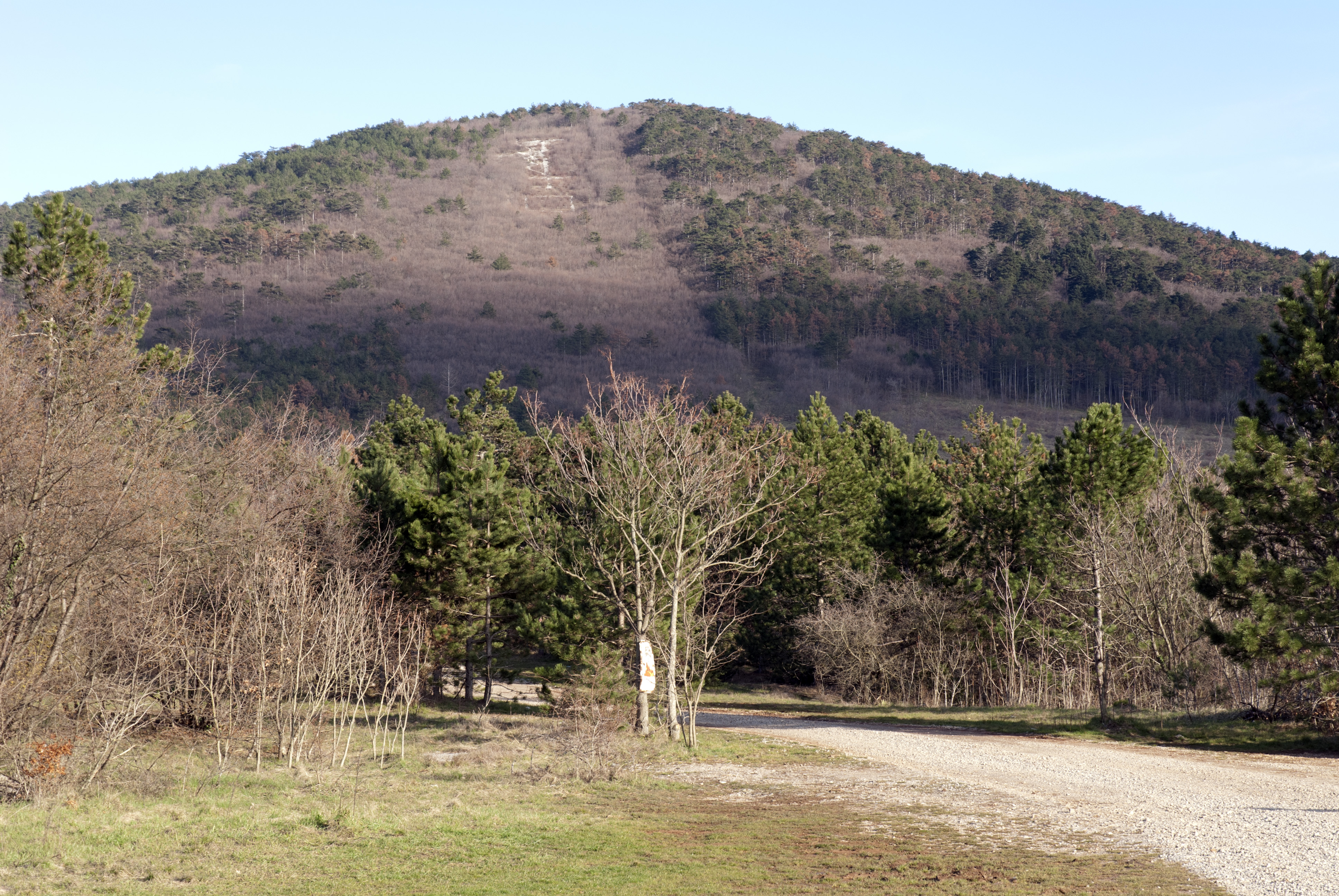
Monte Cocusso

== See also ==
- Karst Living Museum
