= Rilke (disambiguation) =

The name Rilke is often associated with Rainer Maria Rilke (1875–1926), Bohemian-Austrian poet (Duino Elegies, Sonnets to Orpheus).

Other uses of the name Rilke may also refer to:

- 9833 Rilke (1982 DW3), a main-belt asteroid discovered in 1982 by R. Ziener, named after Rainer Maria Rilke
- Emil Rilke (born 1983), Czech footballer
- Rilke trail, a hiking trail in Duino-Aurisina, Gulf of Trieste, Italy, named for Rainer Maria Rilke
