= Rilke trail =

Scenic trail in Italy

Coordinates: 45°46′19″N 13°36′46″E

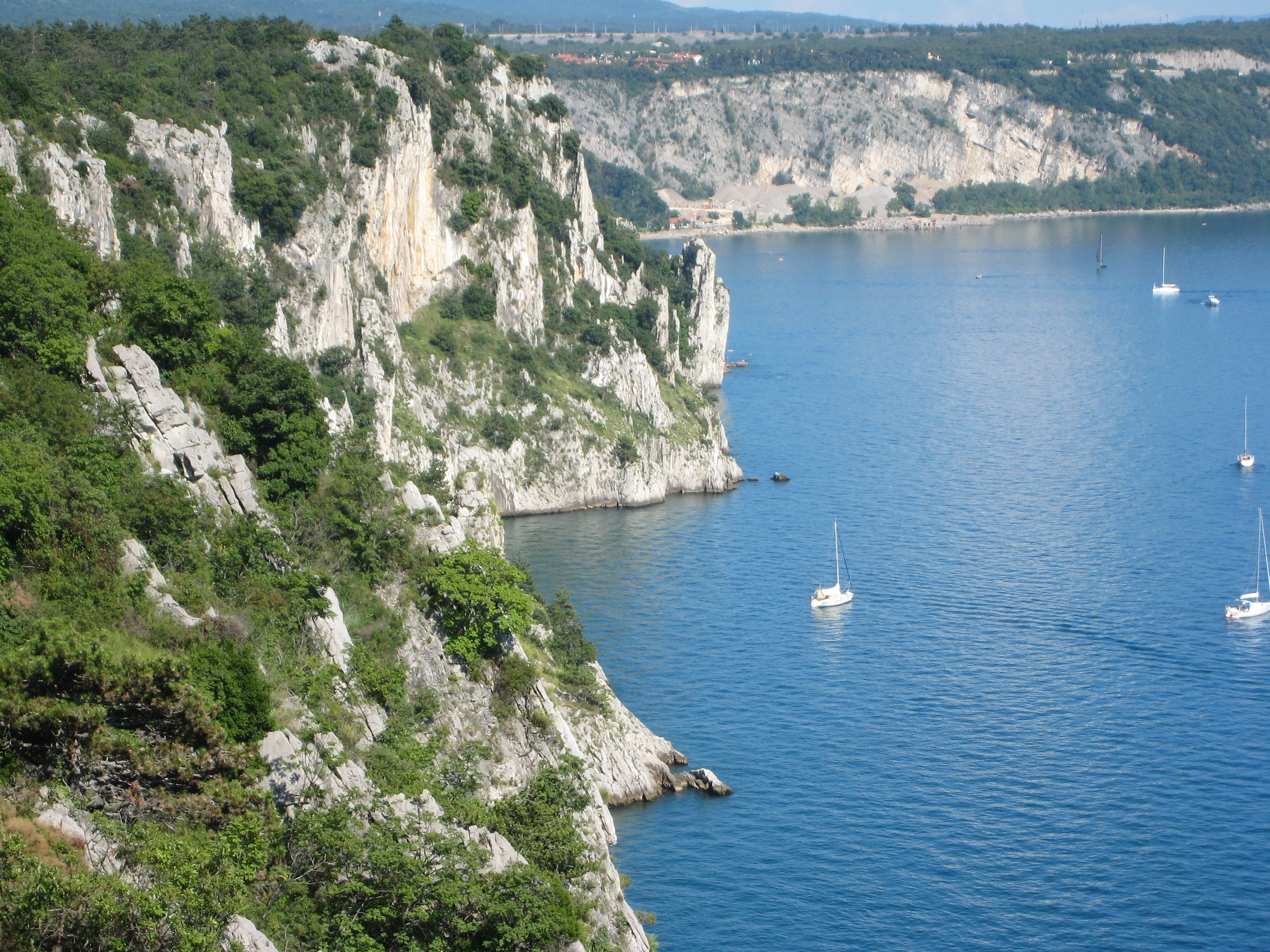
The cliffs of Duino (Devin) and the gulf of Sistiana, seen from the Rilke trail

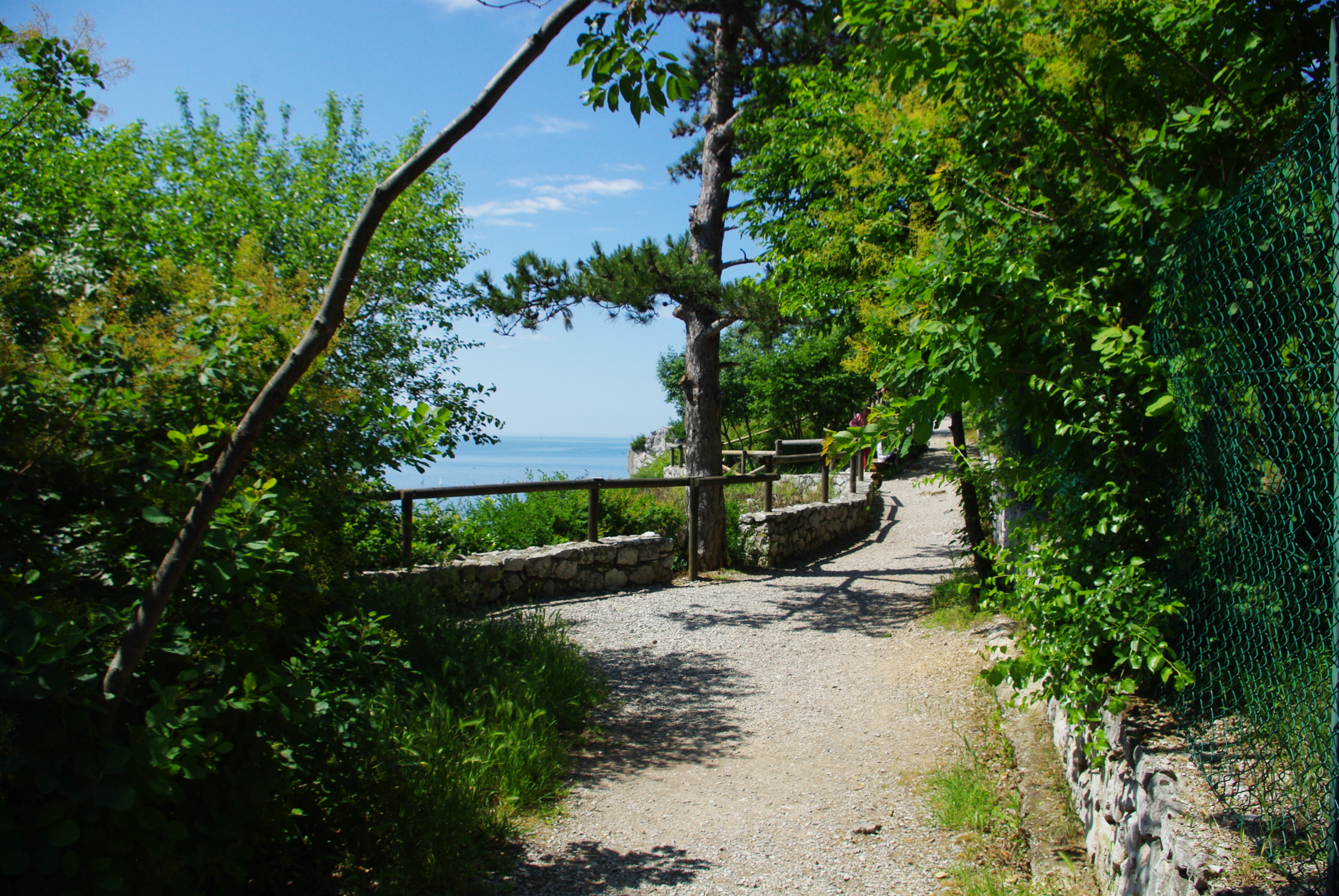
A view of the Rilke trail

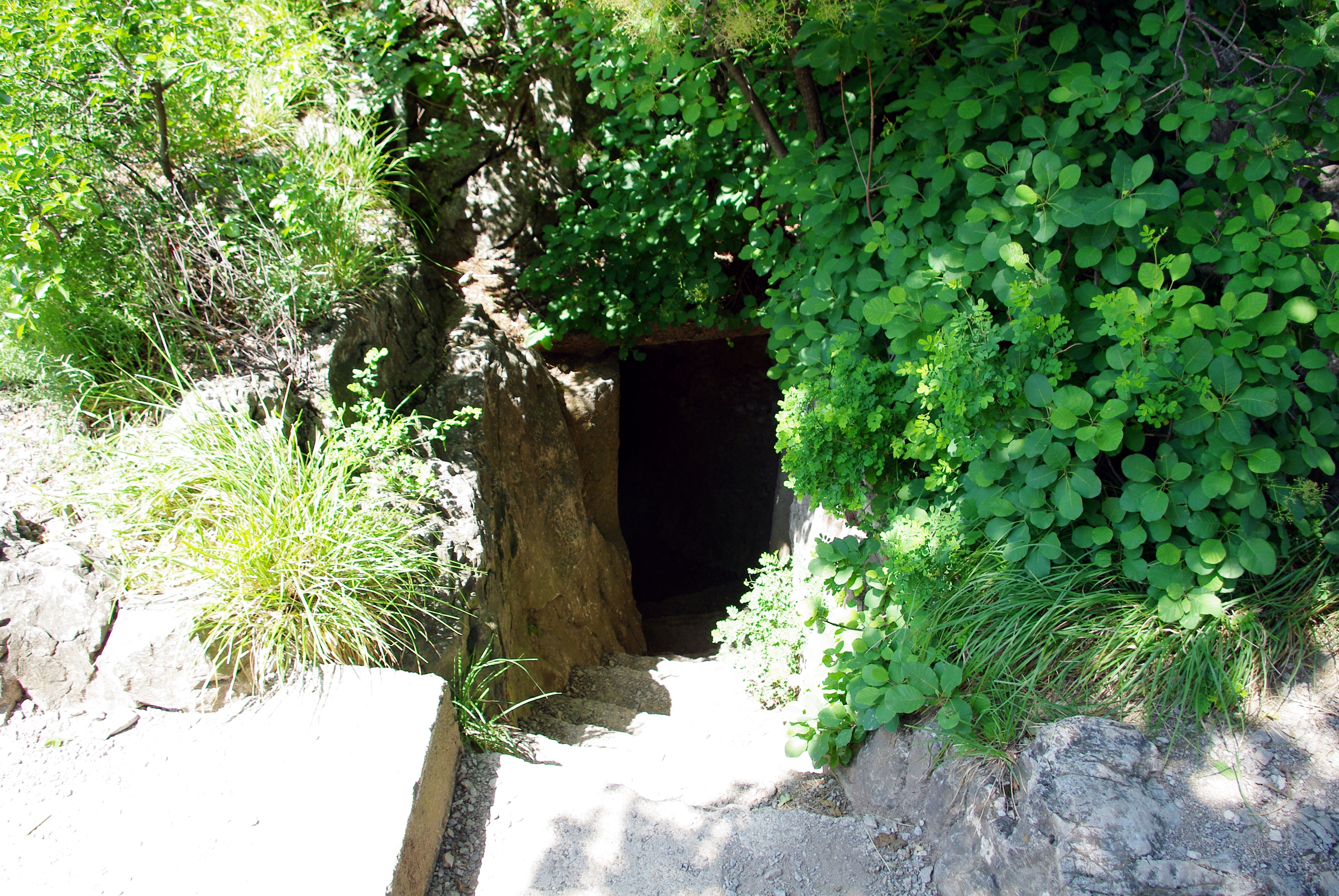
Rilke trail, entrance at the observation post

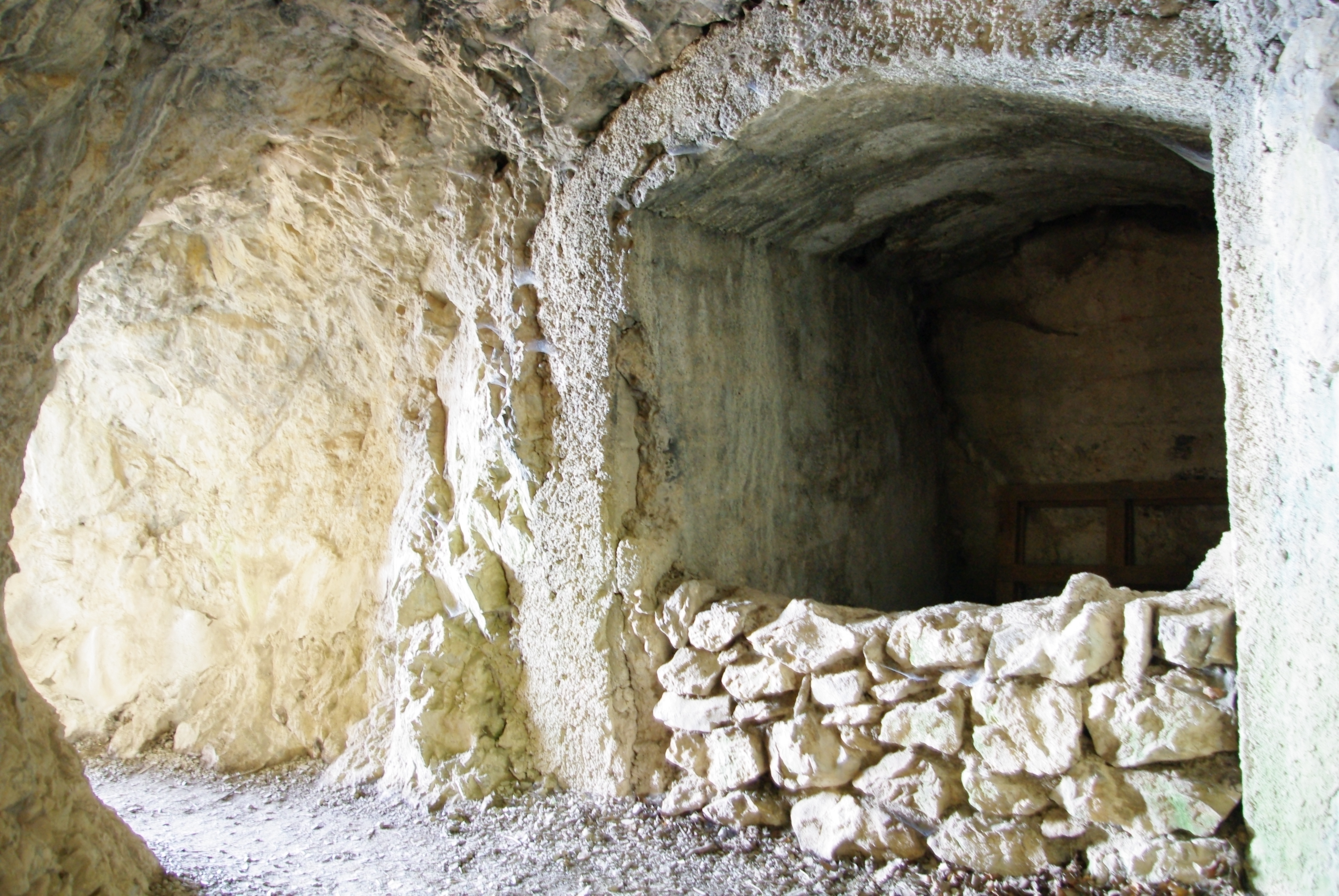
Rilke trail, inside the observation post

The Rilke trail (Italian: Sentiero Rilke, Slovene: Rilkejeva pešpot) is a tourist trail, providing a scenic view of the Gulf of Trieste. It is named after the poet Rainer Maria Rilke.

It connects the villages of Duino and Sistiana, both in the municipality of Duino-Aurisina.

== Features ==
For a long time the trail was abandoned but in 1987 it was restored by the Province of Trieste.

At the beginning of the path, Sistiana Bay can be seen, and local flora and fauna can be seen at the end, near Duino Castle.

Over the course of the trail there are three observation points created during World War II.
