= Duino =

- Frazione
- Duino Castle
- Interactive map of Duino
- Location of Duino in Italy
- Coordinates: 45°46′29″N 13°36′22″E
- Country: Italy
- Region: Friuli-Venezia Giulia
- Comune: Duino-Aurisina
- Elevation: 39 m (128 ft)

Population (2001)
  - Total: 1,421
- Demonym: Duinesi or Duinati
- Time zone: UTC+1 (CET)
  - Summer (DST): UTC+2 (CEST)
- Postal code: 349011
- Dialing code: 040

Duino (Slovene: Devin, German: Tybein) is today a seaside resort on the northern Adriatic coast. It is a hamlet of Duino-Aurisina, a municipality (comune) of the Friuli-Venezia Giulia region of northeastern Italy. The settlement, picturesquely situated on the steep Karst cliffs of the Gulf of Trieste, is known for Duino Castle, immortalized by the poet Rainer Maria Rilke in his Duino Elegies.

== Name ==
Duino was attested in historical sources as Duino in 1139, Dewin in the 13th century, and Tybein c. 1370, among various other forms of the name. Equivalents of the Slovene name appear in various Slavic languages (cf. Slovak Devín, Polish Dziewin, etc., all ultimately derived from Slavic *děva 'girl'). However, another possibility is that the name of this settlement may derive from Romance tubīnum < Latin tubus '(water) pipe'.

== History ==
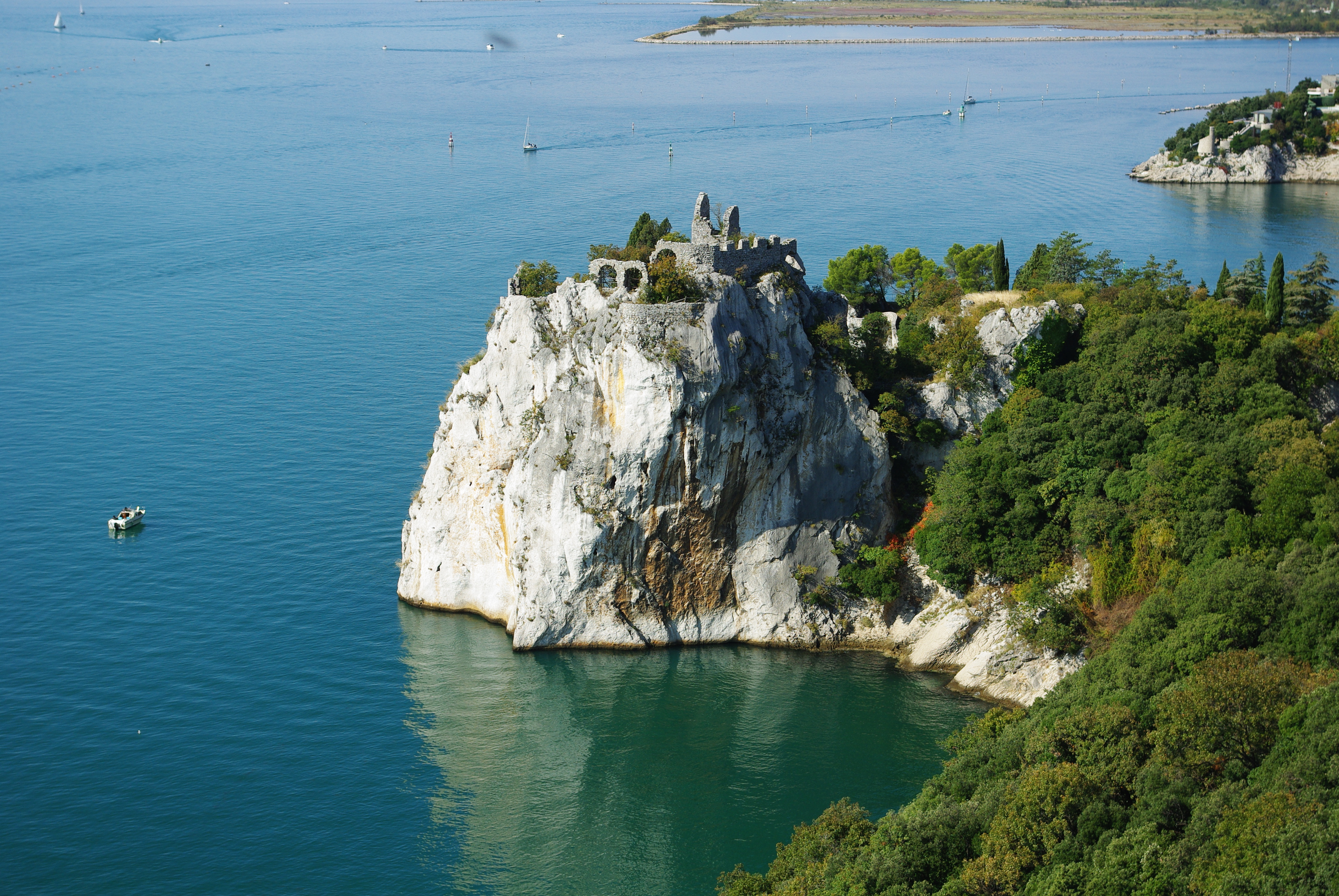
Old Castle ruins

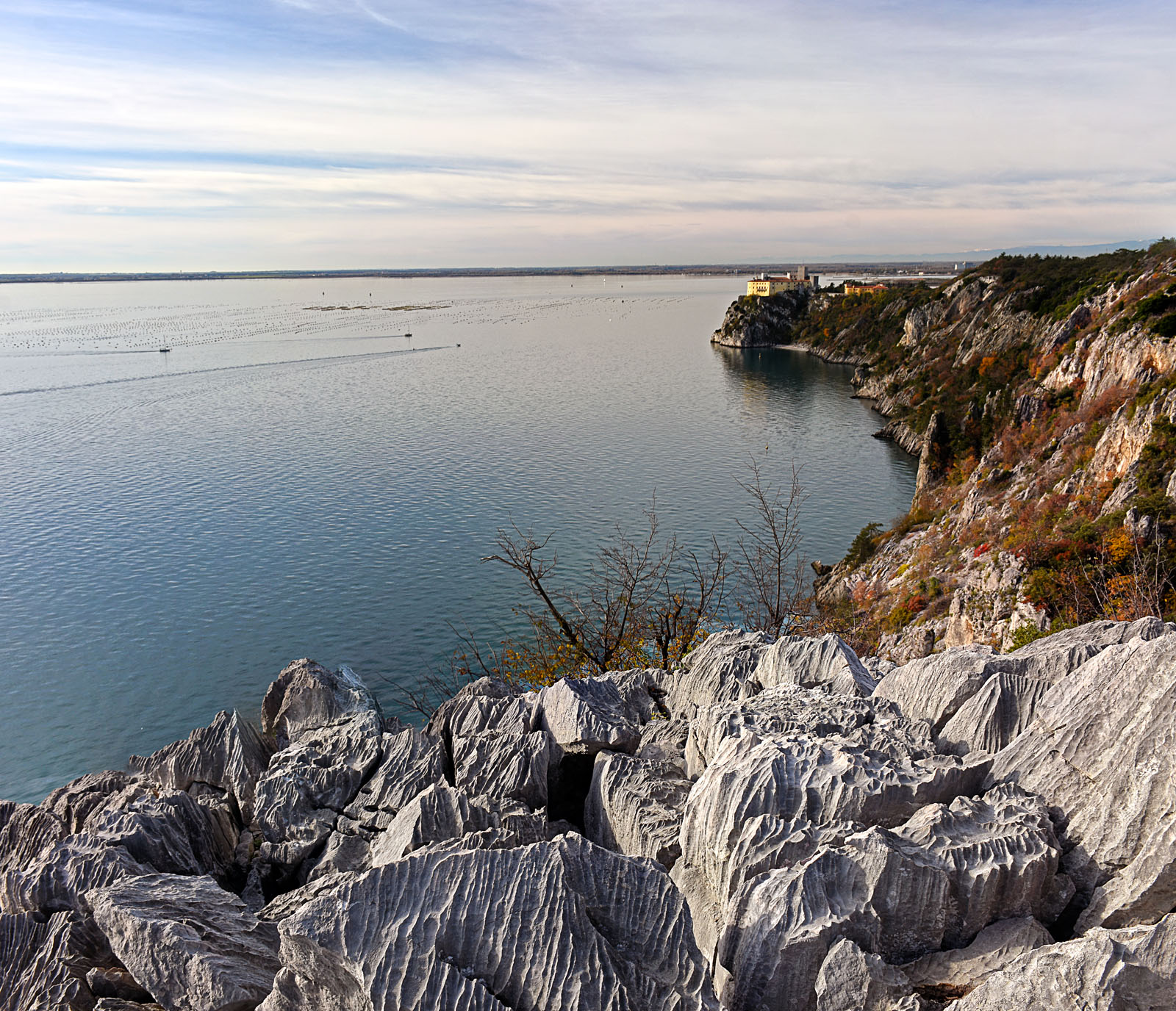
The karst of Duino cliffs

The Lords of Duino, vassals of the Patriarchs of Aquileia, were first mentioned about 1150. From their ancestral seat, located on a rock high above the Adriatic Sea, they controlled the trade routes running from the city of Monfalcone along the coast to the Istrian peninsula. Serving as ministeriales of the Counts of Gorizia and also of their successors, the Habsburg archdukes of Inner Austria, they secured their position in the Friuli region.

Their Old Castle is today in ruins, while the newer Duino Castle, dating back to 1389, is inhabited to this day and can be visited by tourists. Below the ruins of the ancient castle there lies a white rock projecting into the sea, the Dama Bianca, which resembles a veiled woman and gave origin to many gothic legends. Held by the descendants of the Della Torre (Thurn) noble family from the 16th century onwards, the estates were inherited by Marie von Thurn und Taxis (1855–1934) in 1893. A patron of the arts and socialite, she accommodated Rainer Maria Rilke at Duino Castle from 1911 to 1912 and he dedicated his Duino Elegies to her. By the late 19th century, Duino with its scenic views and Mediterranean climate had become a fashionable seaside resort on the Austrian Riviera. Notable guests included Emperor Franz Joseph I of Austria and Empress Elisabeth, Archduke Maximilian I, his consort Charlotte, and Archduke Franz Ferdinand, as well as Eleonora Duse, Franz Liszt, Gabriele D'Annunzio, Paul Valéry, Mark Twain, and Victor Hugo.

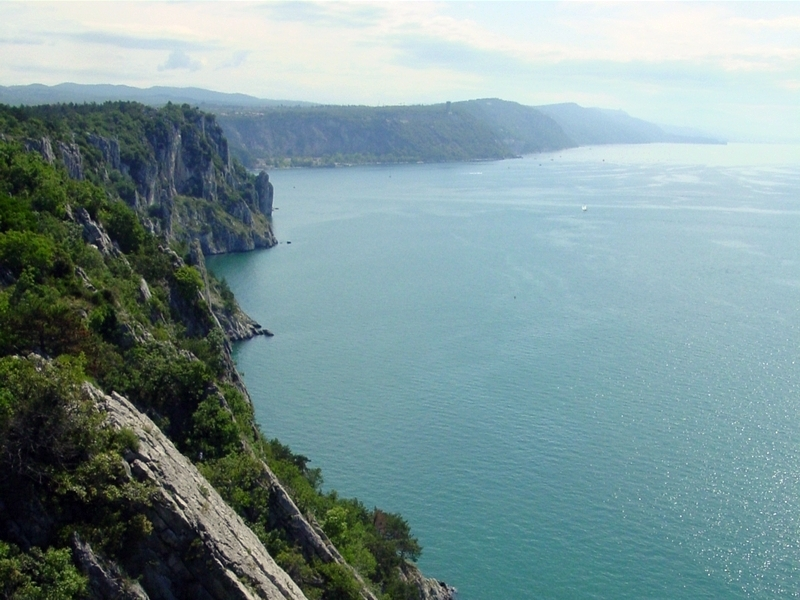
Coastline, view from the Rilke trail

After World War I and the dissolution of the Austro-Hungarian Empire, Duino became part of the Kingdom of Italy. It was merged into the municipality of Duino-Aurisina in 1928.

Until the 1950s, Duino was a predominantly Slovene-speaking village with a sizeable Italian-speaking minority. According to the last Austrian census of 1910, 63.5% of the inhabitants of the town were Slovenes and 25.1% were Italians (the rest were either German speakers or foreign citizens). The Italian census of 1921 confirmed the Slovene ethnic character of the town, and even showed an increase of the proportion of Slovene speaking population to 78.4% (mostly as the result of the emigration of Austrians and Germans residing in the town). During the years of the Free Territory of Trieste (1947–1954), however, its ethnic composition changed considerably, as many Istrian Italians fleeing from Yugoslavia settled in Duino.

Today, Duino is a predominantly Italian-speaking town, with a Slovene-speaking minority. Most signs are written in both languages, and the municipality of Duino-Aurisina is an officially bilingual one. Since 1982 the village has been home to United World College of the Adriatic, an international school attended by students from over 80 countries, and one of 18 UWCs around the world.

== Notable people ==
Duino is noted for being the place where the physicist Ludwig Boltzmann committed suicide in 1906. It is also the place where the well-known Slovene folk legend Lepa Vida takes place.

== See also ==
- Aurisina
- Sistiana
- County of Gorizia and Gradisca
- Austrian Littoral
