= Duino-Aurisina =

Duino-Aurisina Devin Nabrežina (Slovene)
- Comune
- Comune di Duino Aurisina; Občina Devin-Nabrežina
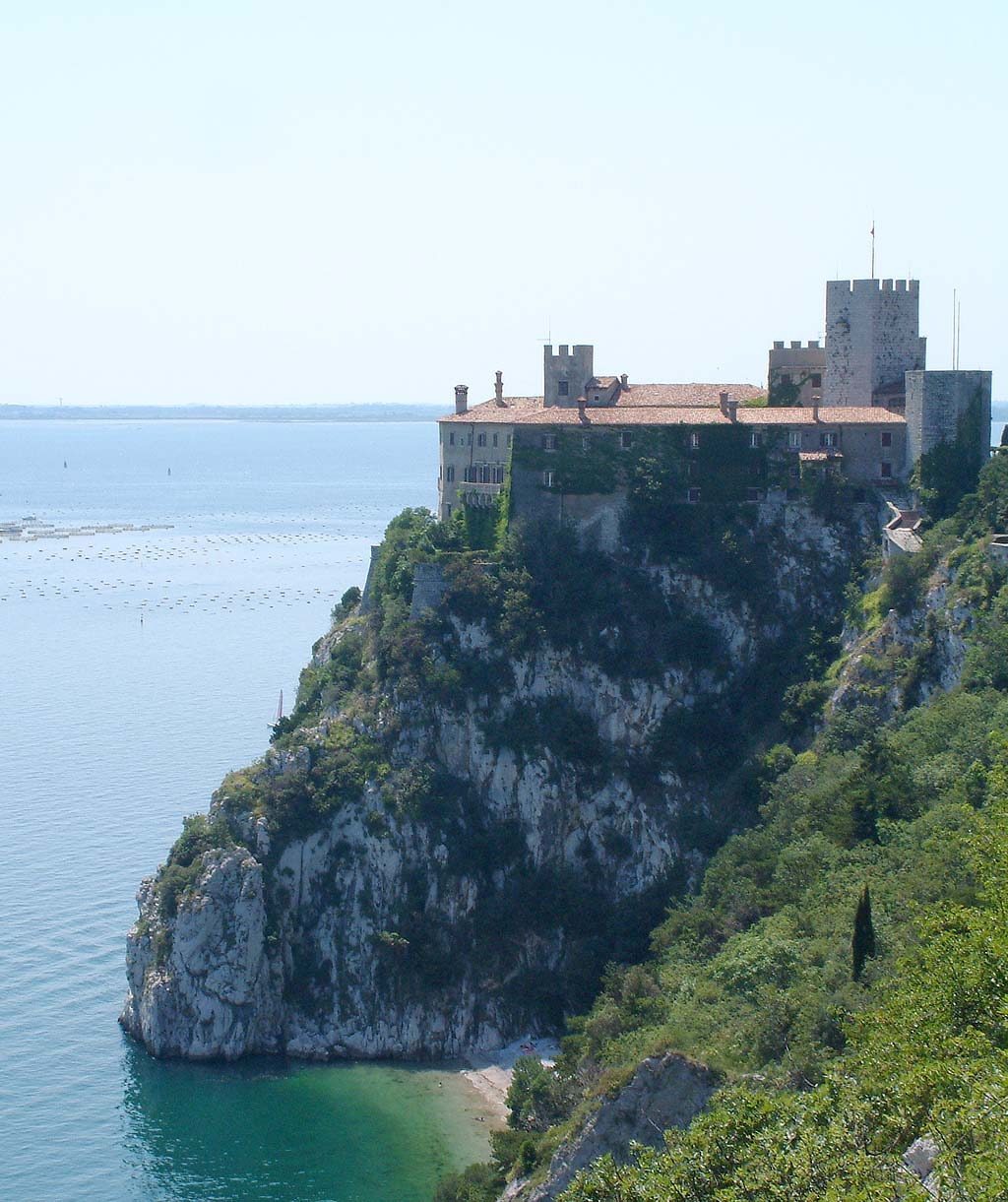
- Duino castle

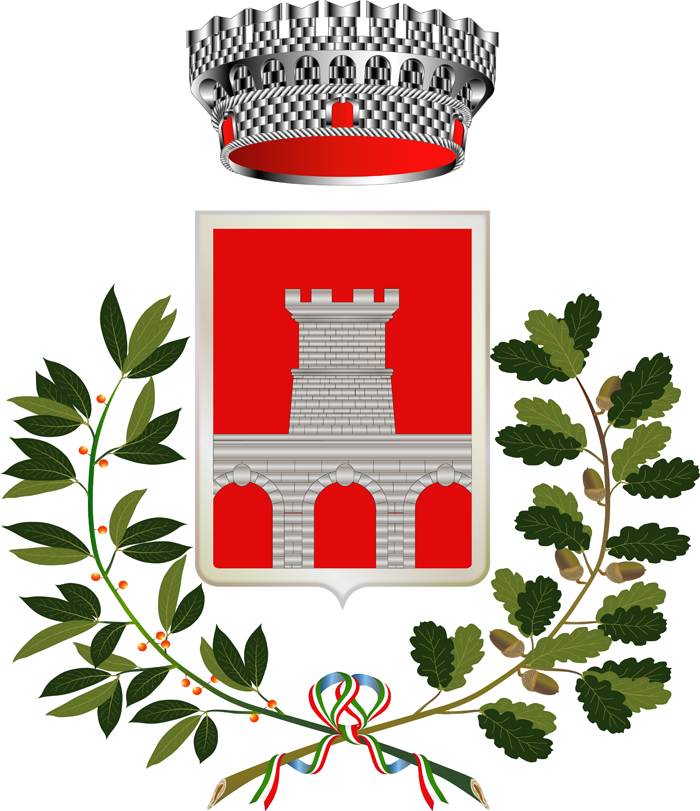
- Coat of arms
- Interactive map of Duino-Aurisina
- Location within Friuli-Venezia Giulia Location within Italy
- Coordinates: 45°44′N 13°45′E
- Country: Italy
- Region: Friuli-Venezia Giulia
- Province: Trieste (TS)
- Frazioni: See list

Government
  - Mayor: Igor Gabrovec (Centre-Left)

Area
  - Total: 45 km^{2} (17 sq mi)
- Elevation: 144 m (472 ft)

Population (31 July 2025)
  - Total: 8,159
  - Density: 180/km^{2} (470/sq mi)
- Demonym(s): Duinati (Devinčani), Aurisiniani (Nabrežinci)
- Time zone: UTC+1 (CET)
  - Summer (DST): UTC+2 (CEST)
- Postal code: 34011, 34013, 34019
- Dialing code: 040
- Patron saint: Saint Roch
- Saint day: 16 August
- Website: Official website

Duino-Aurisina (Slovene: Devin-Nabrežina; German: Thübein-Nabreschin, also Tybein; Triestine: Duin-Aurisina) is a comune (municipality) in the regional decentralization entity of Trieste, in the Italian region of Friuli-Venezia Giulia. As of 31 July 2025, it had a population of 8,159 and an area of 45.2 km^{2} (17.5 sq mi). Lying near the border with Slovenia, it has a substantial Slovene minority. Duino-Aurisina is named after its two major settlements: Duino (Devin) and Aurisina (Nabrežina).

The municipality of Duino-Aurisina contains these frazioni (subdivisions, mainly villages and hamlets), with Italian names followed by Slovene names in brackets: Aurisina (until the rise of fascism Nabresina) (Nabrežina), Ceroglie (Cerovlje), Duino (Devin), Malchina (Mavhinje), Medeazza (Medja vas), Precenico (Prečnik), Prepotto (Praprot), San Pelagio (Šempolaj), San Giovanni di Duino (Štivan), Sistiana (Sesljan), Slivia (Slivno), Ternova (Trnovca), Villaggio del Pescatore (Ribiško naselje), Visogliano (Vižovlje), Aurisina S. Croce (Nabrežina Križ), Aurisina Cave (Nabrežina Kamnolomi), Aurisina Stazione (Nabrežina Postaja) and Aurisina Centro (Nabrežina).

Duino-Aurisina borders the following municipalities: Komen (Slovenia), Doberdò del Lago, Monfalcone, Sežana (Slovenia), Sgonico, Trieste.

== Geography ==
The town lies on the Adriatic coast, about 15 kilometres (9 mi) northwest of Trieste, on the border with Slovenia. The territory includes part of the coastal Karst and the Trieste Riviera, overlooking the northernmost inlet of the Adriatic Sea, the Gulf of Panzano, acting as a connection between the Trieste hub and the Julian-Isonzo and Friuli-Udine areas, as well as between the inland Karst and the sea.

Nestled in a karst environment, the municipal area is characterized by the typical features of this environment: sinkholes, caves, foibe, scarcity of surface water, etc. The flora and fauna are also typical of the Karst. The highest point in the municipality is the 343-meter Ternova Hill. Along the coastal strip, the climate and vegetation are Mediterranean, and the Duino Cliffs Nature Reserve, established in 1996, is also located there.

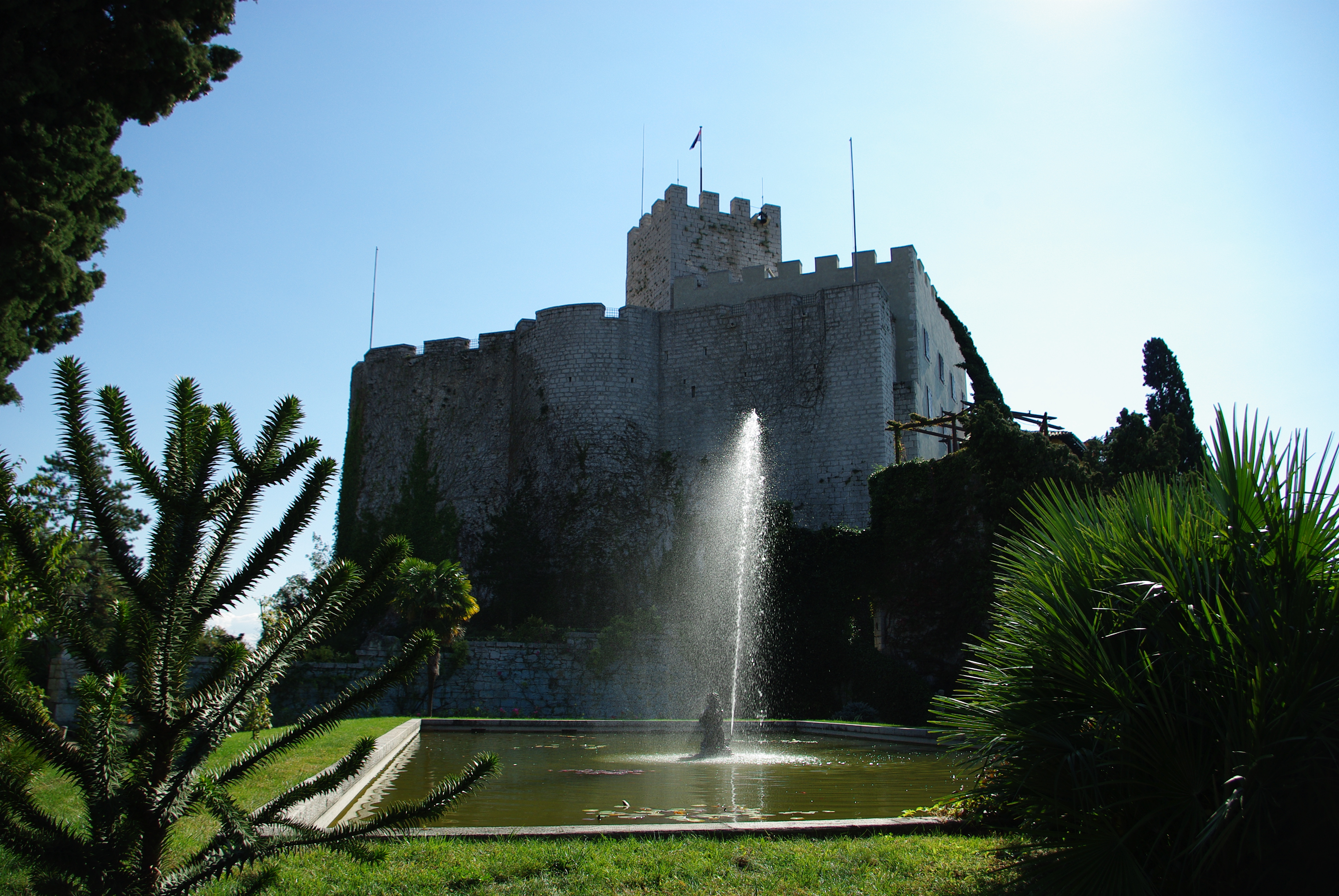
Fountain and castle Duino

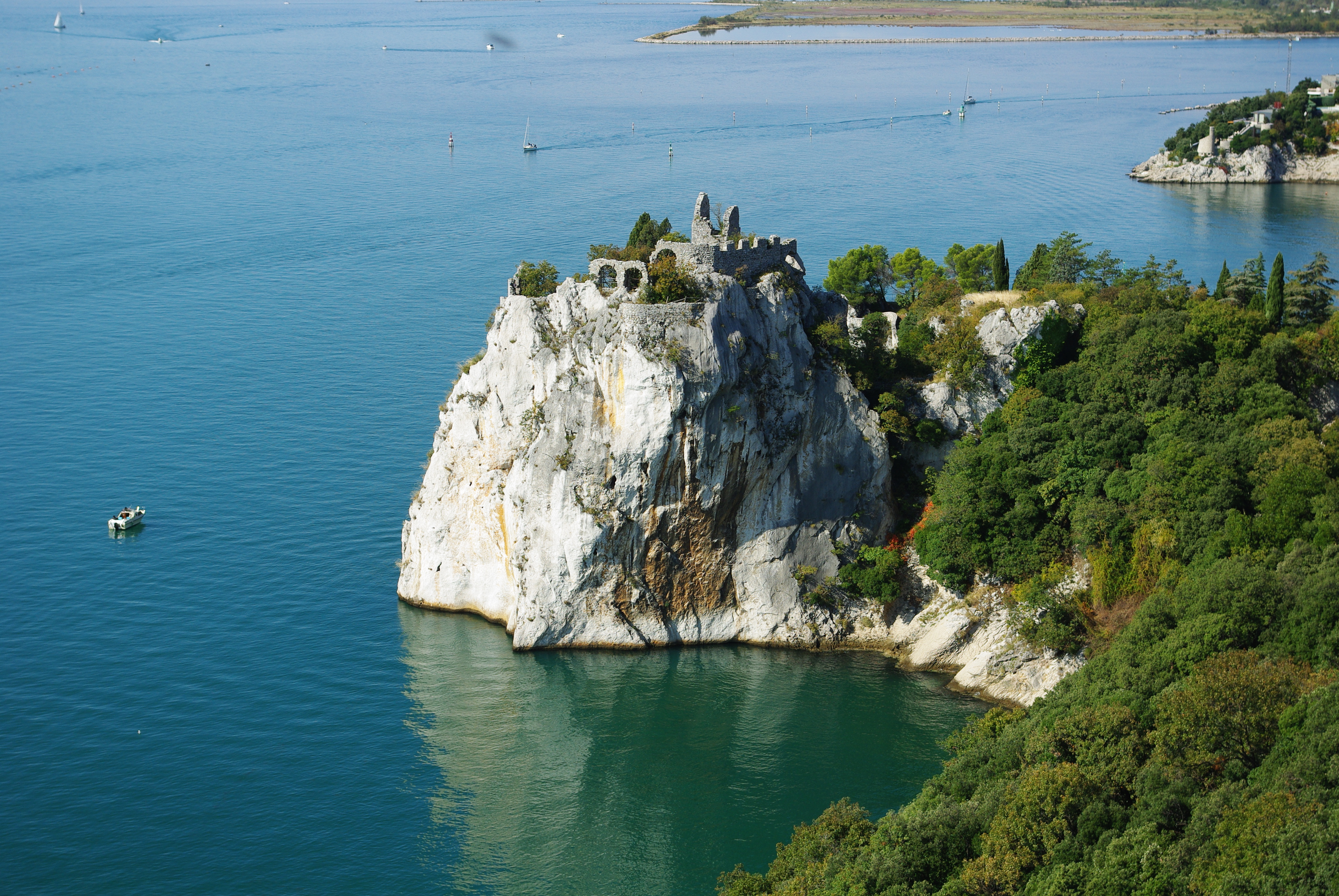
Peninsula near old castle Duino

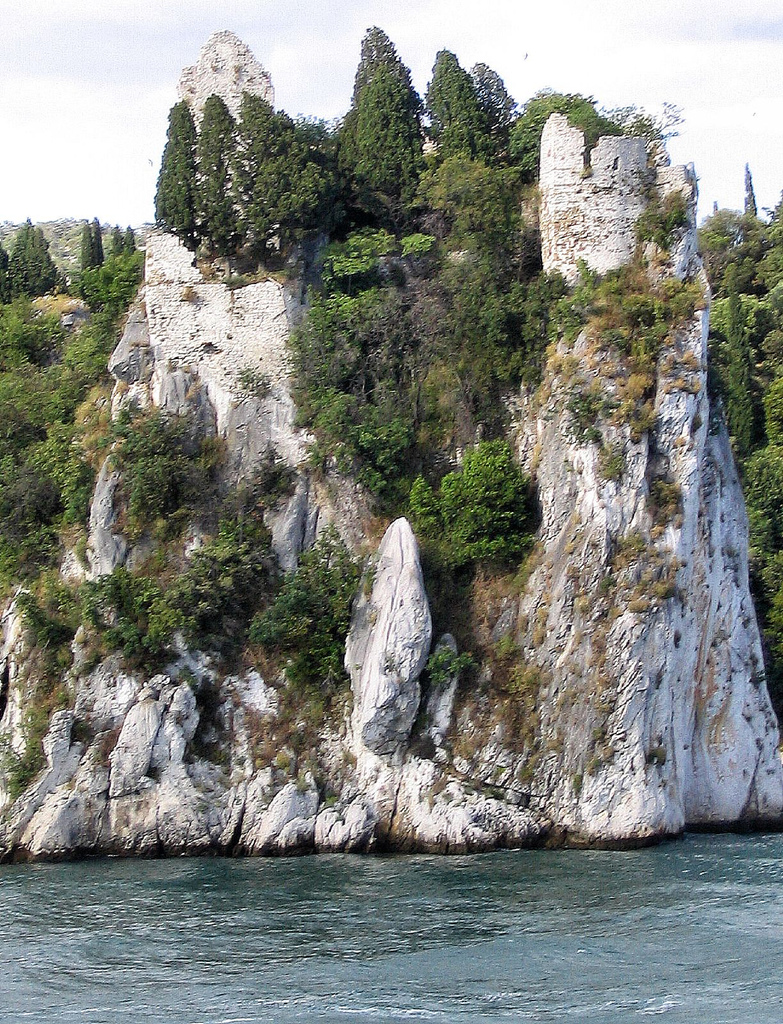
The Dama Bianca

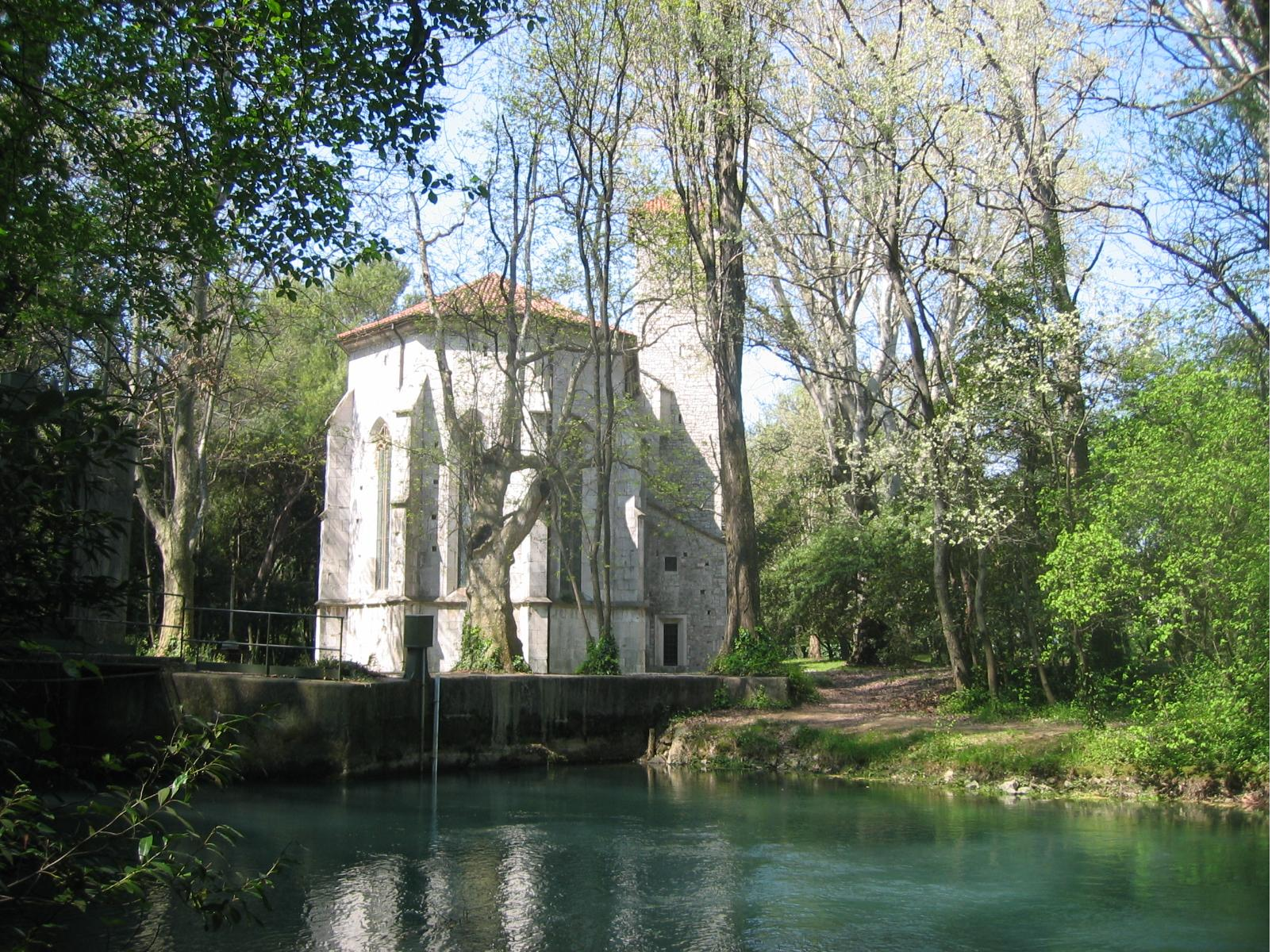
Timava river near Golfo di Panzano at San Giovanni di Duino

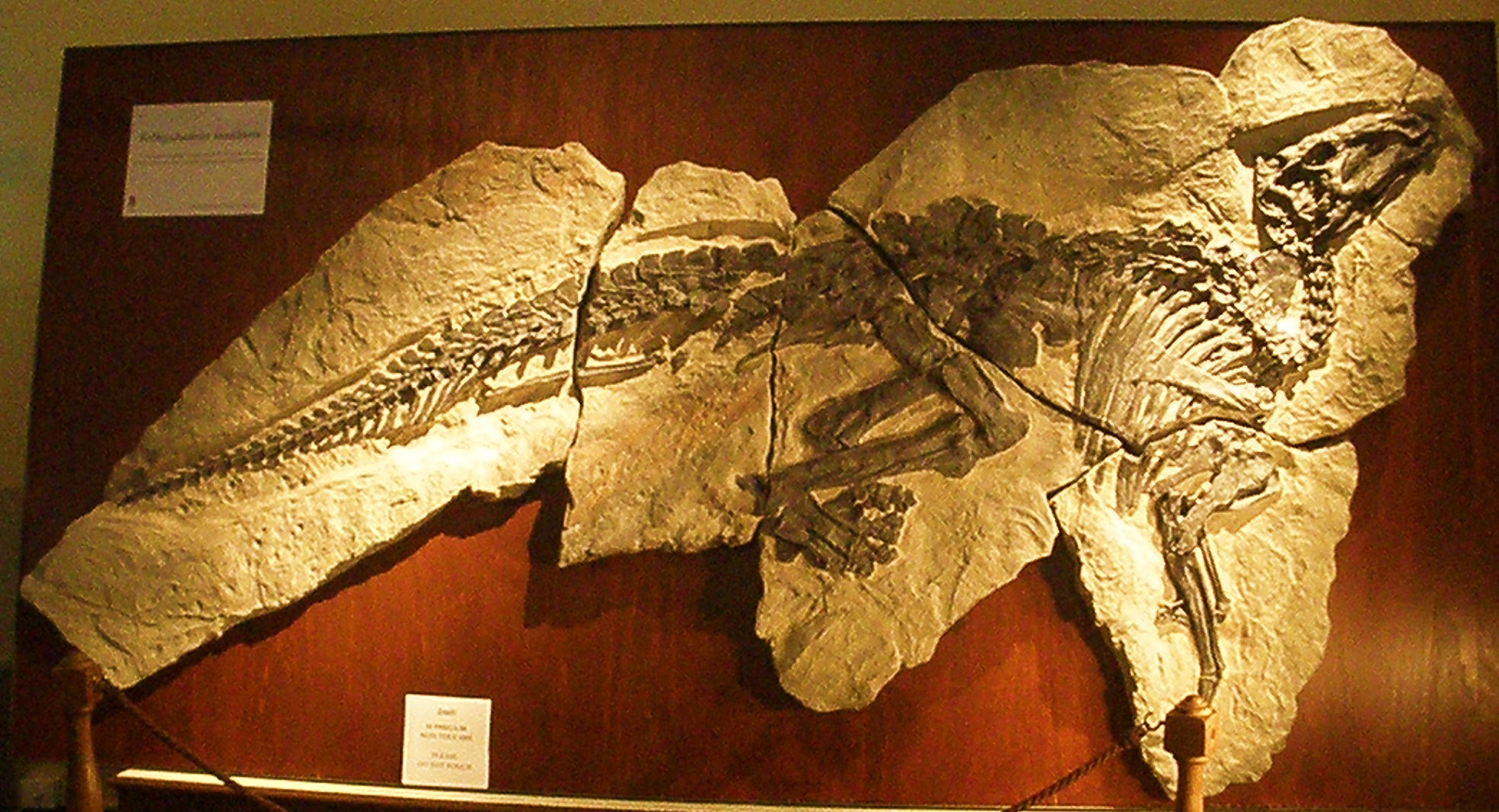
Fossil remains of the Tethyshadros insularis discovered at the Pescatore Village

== History ==
Already inhabited in ancient times (finds at the Visogliano Shelter and the Pocala Cave), the area was inhabited by various pre-Roman populations, such as the Euganean, Venetian, and Histrian peoples. With the founding of the colony of Aquileia, Roman power emerged in the region.

The period of Roman rule was very important, bringing great economic development thanks to the opening of the Aurisina quarry (still called Cava Romana), the use of the coastal ports, and the spread of viticulture. The prized Aurisina stone was used to build Aquileia and the most important Roman monuments in Ravenna. The mouth of the Timavo River marked the boundary between the Aquileian and Tergestino countrysides, with the current municipal territory therefore falling within the latter.

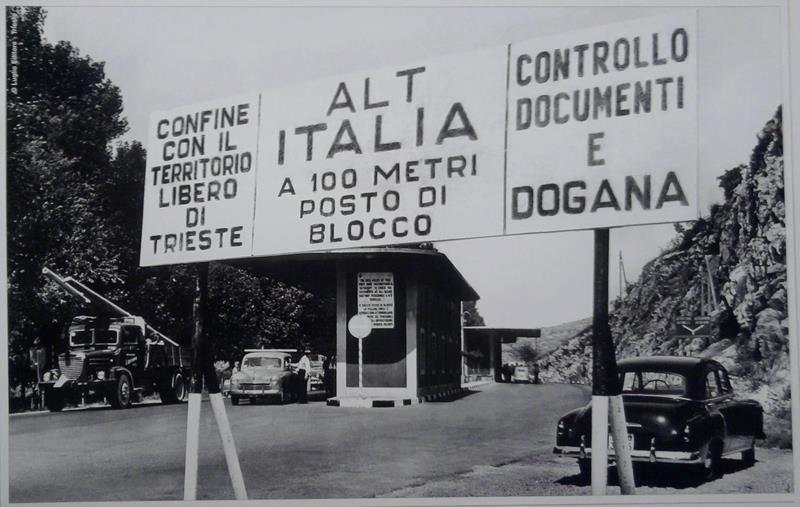
Border between the Free Territory of Trieste (Duino-Aurisina / Devin-Nabrežina) and Italy (Monfalcone)

== Demographic evolution ==
According to the 1971 census, 37.5% of the population (mainly in and around Aurisina) belonged to the Slovene ethnic group and about 60% to the Italian ethnic group (mainly in Duino and Sistiana)

Historical population

Year	Pop.	±%
1861	?	—
1871	?	—
1881	?	—
1901	?	—
1911	?	—
1921	3,913	—

Year	Pop.	±%
1931	4,710	+20.4%
1936	4,382	−7.0%
1951	5,149	+17.5%
1961	6,151	+19.5%
1971	7,542	+22.6%
1981	8,255	+9.5%

Year	Pop.	±%
1991	8,501	+3.0%
2001	8,765	+3.1%
2011	8,586	−2.0%
2021	8,353	−2.7%

Source: Data from ISTAT

== Famous residents ==
The Slovene writer Alojz Rebula was born in San Pelagio, and the Slovene poet Igo Gruden was born in Aurisina. The Slovene economist Ivan Ples was born in Duino, where the composer Andrej Volarič also lived. The poet Rainer Maria Rilke began his Duino Elegies while staying at Duino castle in 1912. The physicist Ludwig Eduard Boltzmann spent his last year, 1906, in Duino.

== Twin towns ==
- Buje, Croatia
- Ilirska Bistrica, Slovenia

== See also ==
- Gorizia and Gradisca
- Julian March
- Karst Plateau
- Slovene Lands
