= Sistiana =

Village in Friuli-Venezia Giulia, Italy

Coordinates: 45°46′00″N 13°38′29″E

- Interactive map of Sistiana

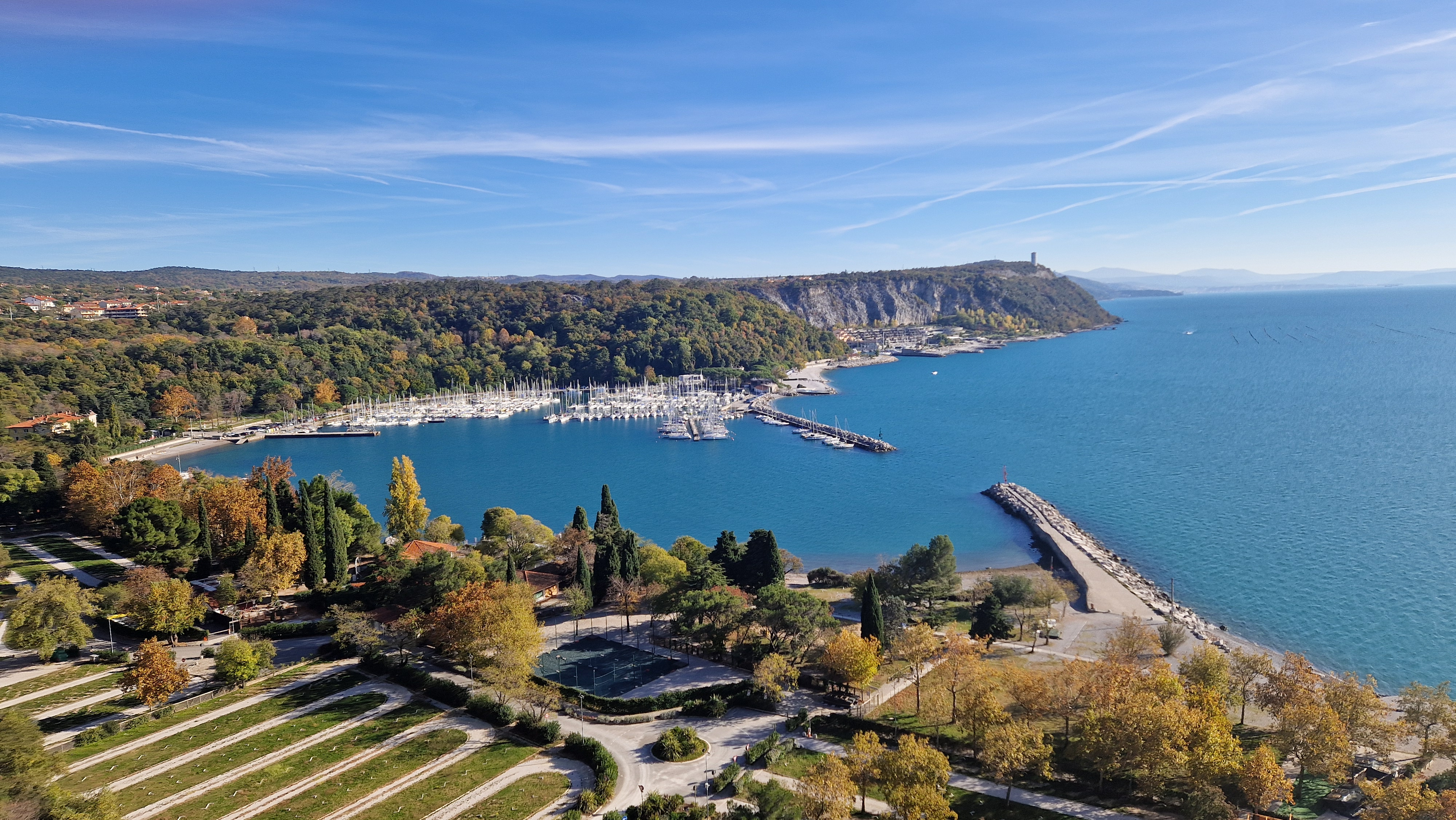
Sistiana Bay

Sistiana (Slovene: Sesljan) is a seaside village in Friuli-Venezia Giulia, in the far northeast of Italy near the Slovene border. It is a frazione of the comune of Duino-Aurisina.

== Geography ==
The village lies northwest of Trieste, the provincial capital. The closest airport is located 7 nm west of Sistiana. Average altitude: 70 m above sea level. Sistiana is on time zone UTC +1 (+2DT).

== History ==
The name is derived from the Latin Sextilianum, which may represent the first Roman settlement in the region of Trieste. A Roman villa has been discovered nearby, and the local quarries were exploited in the 2nd century AD.

There were border clashes in the 16th century between the lords of Duino and the city of Trieste.

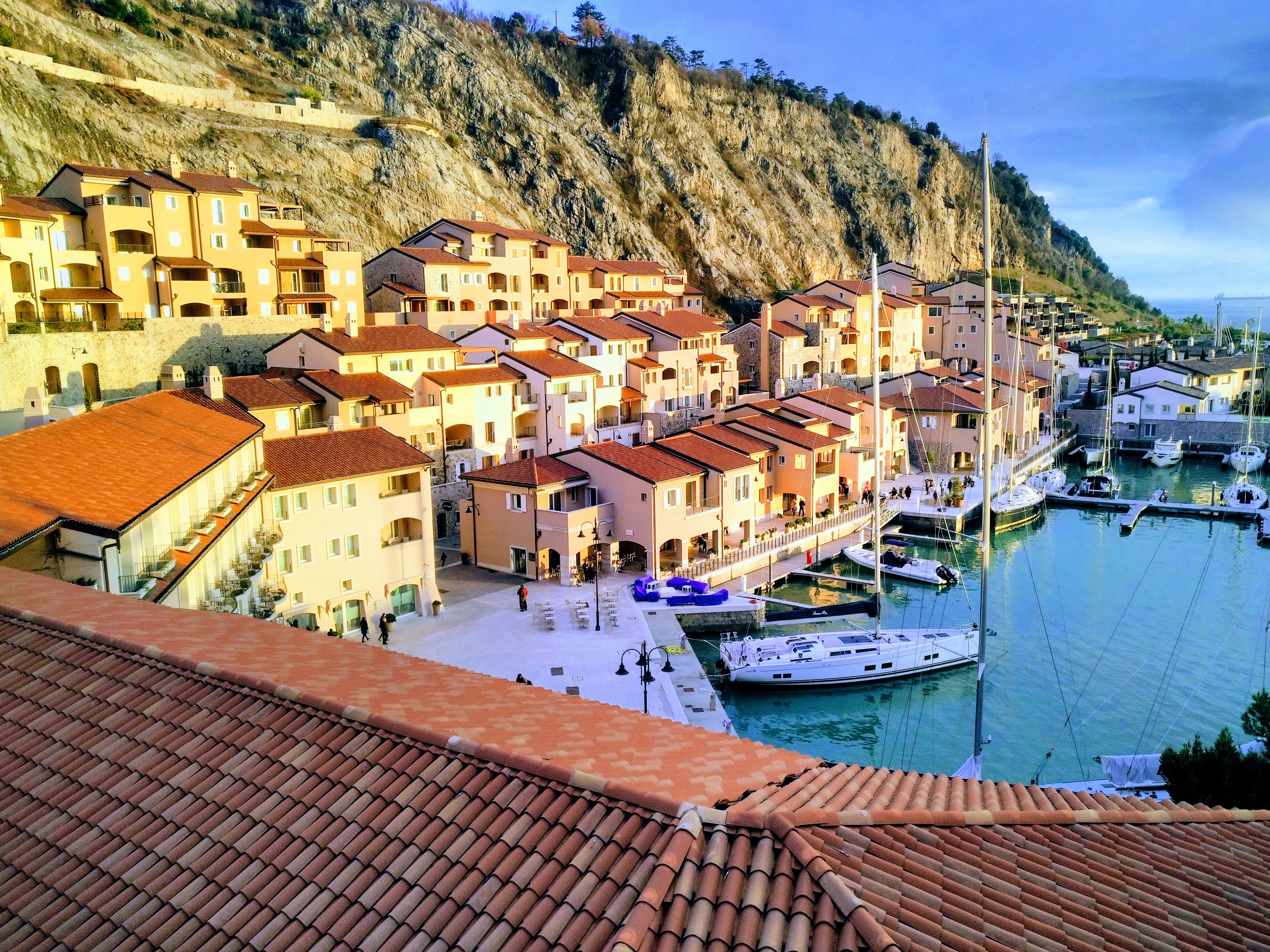
Sistiana bay, east side

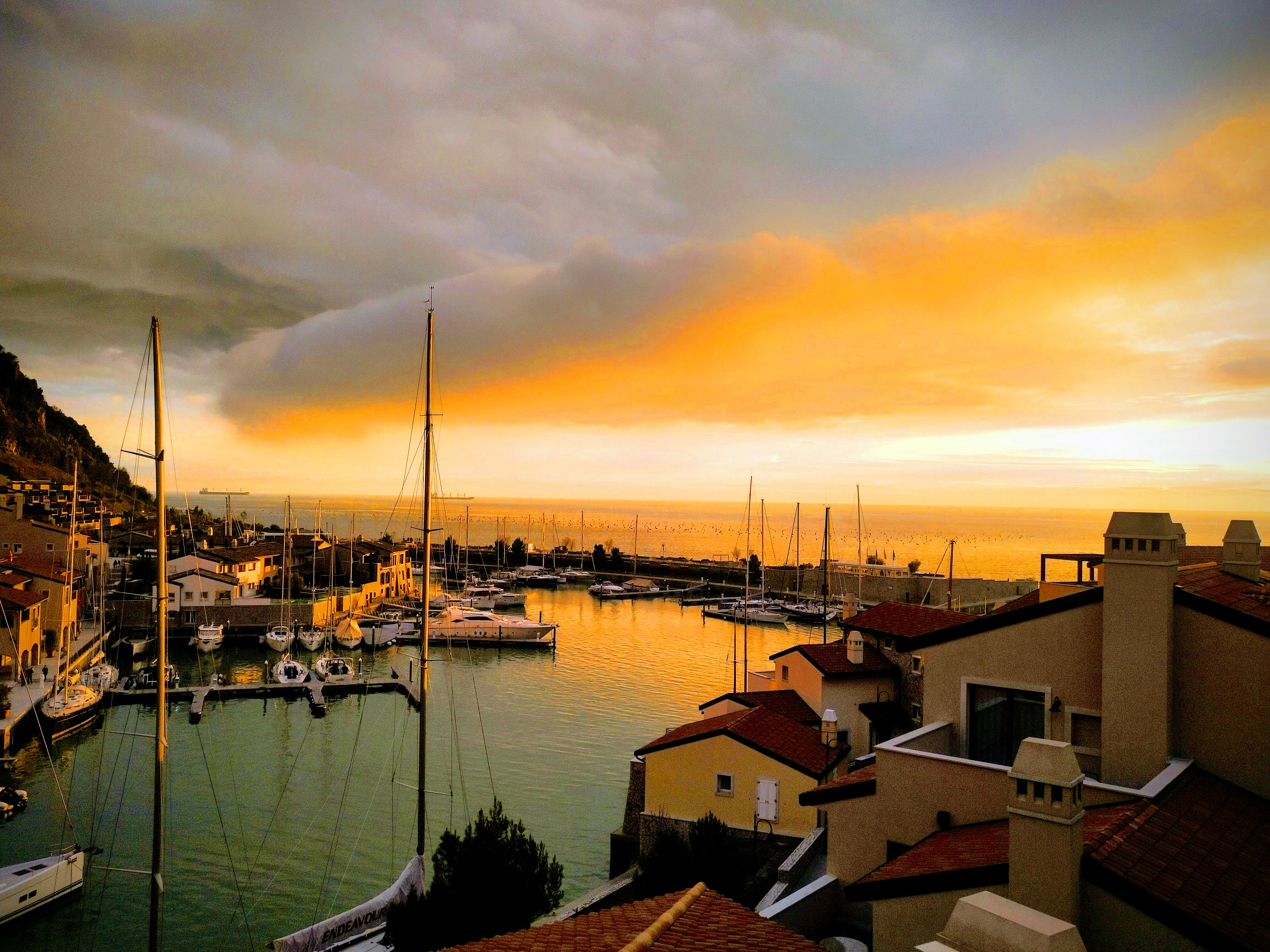
Sunset over Sistiana Bay

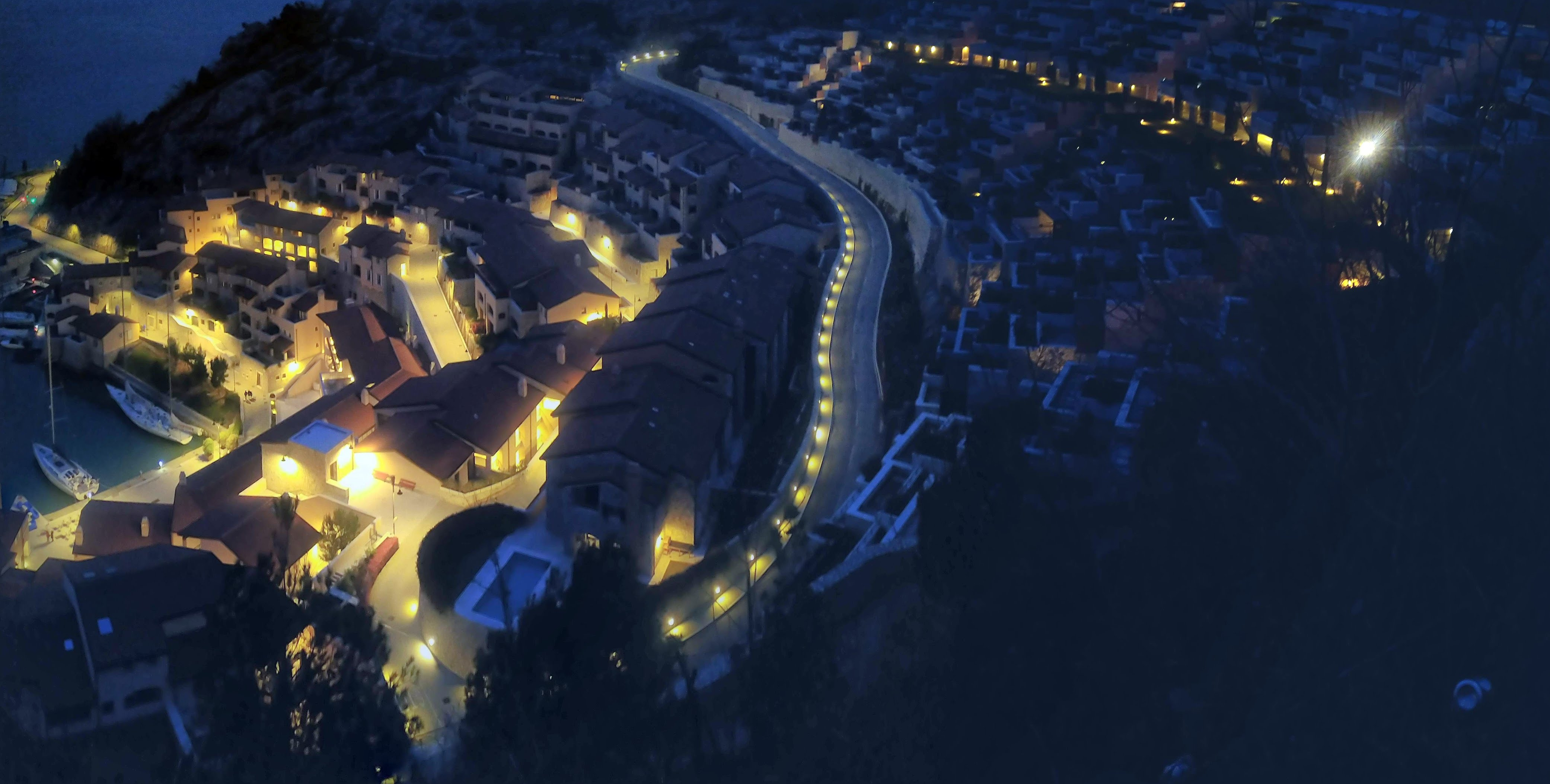
Sistiana Bay by night

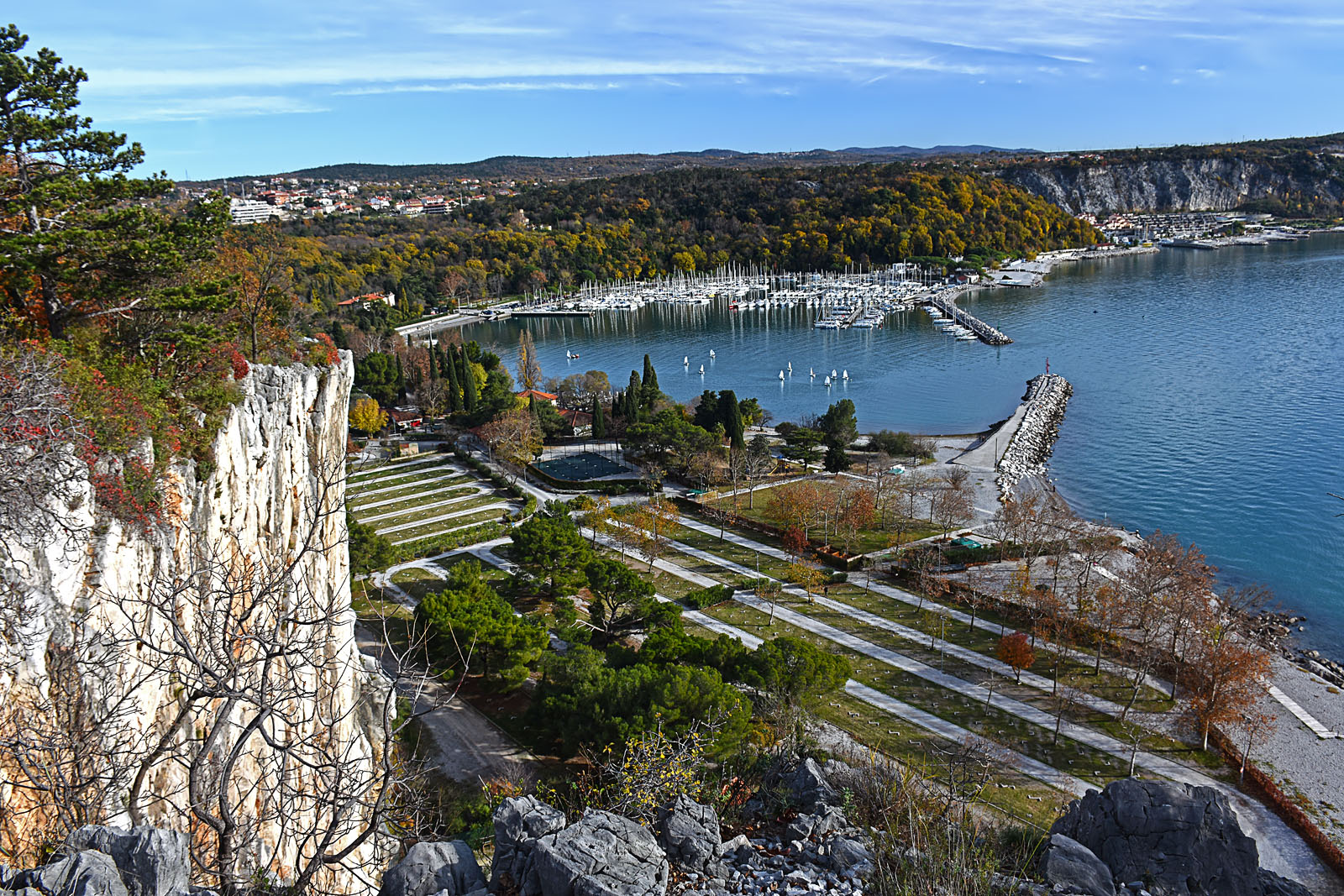
Sistiana bay

== Notes and references ==
Media related to Sistiana at Wikimedia Commons
