= Raccordo autostradale RA14 =

Controlled-access highway in Italy

Raccordo autostradale 14
- Motorway connection 14
- Diramazione per Fernetti; Fernetti motorway connection

Route information
- Part of E70
- Maintained by ANAS
- Length: 1.5 km (0.93 mi)
- Existed: 1997–present

Major junctions
- West end: Opicina
- RA 13 in Opicina
- East end: Fernetti

Location
- Country: Italy
- Regions: Friuli-Venezia Giulia

Highway system
- Roads in Italy; Autostrade; State; Regional; Provincial; Municipal
| ← RA 13 | → RA 15 |

Raccordo autostradale 14 (RA 14; "Motorway connection 14"), also referred to as Diramazione per Fernetti ("Fernetti motorway connection"), is an autostrada (Italian for "motorway") 1.5 kilometres (0.93 mi) long in Italy located in the region of Friuli-Venezia Giulia which connects the Raccordo autostradale RA13 near Opicina with the Italy–Slovenia border of Fernetti. At the border, the junction engages seamlessly with the Slovenian A3 motorway, which passes close to Sesana and engages, at Divaccia, with the Slovenian A1 Motorway, which ends in Ljubljana. It is a part of the E70 European route.

== Route ==
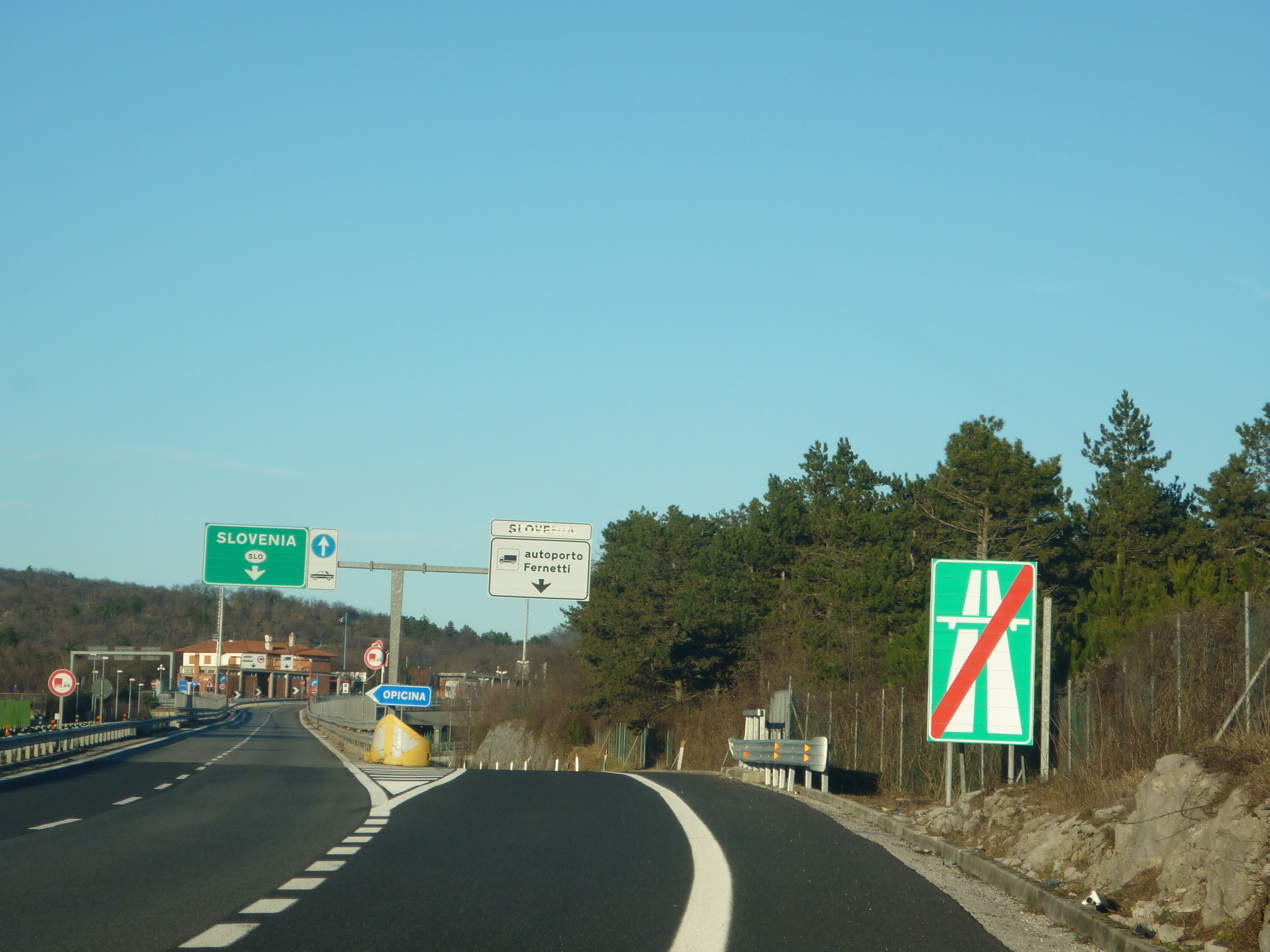
Raccordo autostradale RA14 near Fernetti

RACCORDO AUTOSTRADALE 14; Diramazione per Fernetti
| Exit | ↓km↓ | ↑km↑ | Province | European Route |
| Sistiana-Padriciano | 0.0 km (0 mi) | 1.5 km (0.93 mi) | TS | E70 |
| della Carniola; Autoporto di Fernetti; Italy–Slovenia border Slovenian A3 motorway | 1.5 km (0.93 mi) | 0.0 km (0 mi) | TS | E70 |

== See also ==
- Autostrade of Italy
- Roads in Italy
- Transport in Italy

=== Other Italian roads ===
- State highways (Italy)
- Regional road (Italy)
- Provincial road (Italy)
- Municipal road (Italy)
