= A3 motorway (Slovenia) =

Highway in Slovenia

A3 Motorway
- Avtocesta A3

Route information
- Part of E61 E70
- Length: 11.3 km (7.0 mi)

Major junctions
- From: A1 near Gabrk
- To: Fernetiči; RA14 border with Italy

Location
- Country: Slovenia
- Regions: Littoral
- Major cities: Sežana

Highway system
- Highways in Slovenia

The A3 motorway (Slovene: avtocesta A3, Karst Highway) of Slovenia is 11.3 km long. It begins at the Gabrk interchange on the A1 motorway near Divača and ends at the Italian border at Sežana, continuing on in Italy as the RA14. It connects Ljubljana with Trieste.

== Junctions, exits and rest area ==
A1 (Gabrk) – Fernetiči (12,2 km)
Interchange	x km	Gabrk interchange	A1 motorway (Slovenia)	A1 turns toward -> Ljubljana or Koper
Petrol station	x km	Počivališče Povir		Petrol / Petrol
Dane toll plaza
(1)	x km	Sežana east		
Tunnel		Tabor Tunnel		Tunnel - 289 / 281 m
(2)	x km	Sežana west		
Petrol station Rest area	x km	Počivališče Fernetiči		OMV / OMV
(3)	x km	Fernetiči		
Border control	x km	Fernetiči (SLO) – Fernetti (I) border crossing		
Raccordo autostradale RA14 → to Venice, Italy

== European Route(s) ==
Name	Route
	11,7 km	Gabrk (45) – (Italy) Raccordo autostradale 14
