= Confederazione dei Sindacati Unici Classisti del Territorio libero di Trieste =

Confederazione dei Sindacati Unici Classisti del Territorio libero di Trieste ('Confederation of United Class-Oriented Trade Unions of the Free Territory of Trieste', Sindacati Unici Classisti in brief) was a Titoist trade union confederation in the Free Territory of Trieste. The organization was estimated to have around 2,000 members.

After the Cominform resolution condemning the Communist Party of Yugoslavia, the Titoist trade unionist sector (whose most important leader had been Ivan Bukovec-Vojmir) broke away from the United Trade Unions of the Free Territory of Trieste (Sindacati Unici, the trade union movement linked to the Communist Party of the Free Territory of Trieste) in the autumn of 1948. They founded the Comitato promotore dei sindacati unici classisti ('Promoting Committee of the United Class-Oriented Trade Unions'), with the goal of founding a new trade union confederation. Their work progressed slowly, only in early 1951 were they able to found the Confederazione dei Sindacati Unici Classisti del Territorio libero di Trieste as a new trade union confederation. The publication Il Comunista served as the organ of Sindacati Unici Classisti.

Sindacati Unici Classisti failed to become a prominent force in the labour movement in the Free Territory. A document from the British Foreign Office stated that "[s]carcely anything was heard of the pro-Tito union, Sindacati Unici Classisti,...".

In 1952 Sindacati Unici Classisti sent a petition to the International Labour Organization, protesting restrictions in the freedom of association by the Allied Military Government in the port of Trieste.
