= Slavic-Italian Anti-Fascist Union =

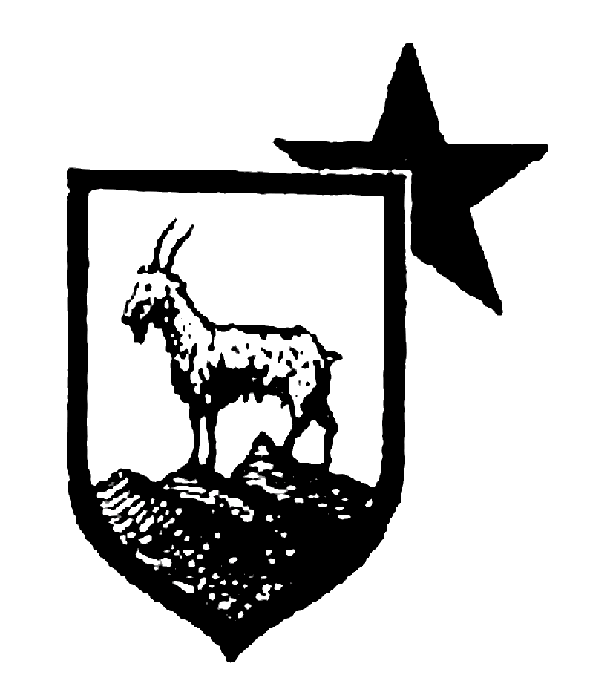
- Founded: 1945
- Headquarters: Trieste
- Membership (1949): 70,000
- Ideology: Communism

The Slavic-Italian Anti-Fascist Union (Italian: Unione Antifascista Italo-Slava, abbreviated UAIS, Slovene: Slovansko-italijanska antifašistična unija, abbreviated SIAU) was a political movement in the Free Territory of Trieste. It was the most important mass organization of the Communist Party of the Free Territory of Trieste (PCTLT/KPSTO). UAIS/SIAU had around 70,000 members.

UAIS/SIAU was founded in the summer of 1945 by the Regional National Liberation Committee, as an umbrella organization of different groups seeking autonomy for Trieste or its integration into Yugoslavia. At the founding congress Triestine, Italian, American, Yugoslav, Soviet and Fiuman flags were displayed, as well as portraits of Clement Attlee, Joseph Stalin, Harry Truman, Giuseppe Garibaldi and Josip Broz Tito.

UAIS/SIAU published the weekly newspapers Fronte unico ('United Front') and L'Istria nuova ('The New Istria'). It also published the newspaper Progresso, directed at the city of Trieste.

UAIS/SIAU used a version of the Italian flag with a red star (a practice common in Italy as well in this period). However, the Allied Military government restricted the usage of this flag, ruling that only 'recognized national flags' be used in the area under their control. Ahead of May Day 1947 the Allied Military Government ruled that UAIS/SIAU could only use the red flag, an act UAIS/SIAU considered a sabotage against their planned event (in which they planned to use Slovenian, Yugoslav and Italian (with and without the red star) alongside the red flag). Furthermore, the Allied Military Government restricted the UAIS/SIAU May Day rally the Slovenian-dominated working class areas, whilst letting pro-Italian groups demonstrate in the city centre.

UAIS/SIAU contested the June 1949 municipal elections (held in the six municipalities in the Anglo-American Zone A), winning 33% of the total vote in Duino-Aurisina, 55% in San Dorligo della Valle, 51% in Sgonico and 97% in Monrupino. In the remaining municipalities, Trieste and Muggia, the Communist Party had its own lists and won 21% and 57% of the votes respectively. The election result was heralded by the Soviet press as a victory for the Communist Party.

== Youth wing ==
The Anti-Fascist Youth Union of the Free Territory of Trieste was one of the constituent organizations of UAIS/SIAU
