= 1949 Free Territory of Trieste municipal election =

Municipal elections were held in the six municipalities of the Anglo-American occupation zone ('Zone A') of the Free Territory of Trieste in June 1949, Trieste, Duino-Aurisina, San Dorligo della Valle, Sgonico, Monrupino and Muggia. There were 197,266 eligible voters in the electoral rolls in Trieste and a combined number of 15,392 eligible voters in the five other municipalities.

The elections were largely symbolic, as the elected officials had no formal decision-making over the Allied Military Government (AMG), which controlled the most areas of administration. Ahead of the elections, the AMG intervened in order to boost the pro-Italian conservative Christian Democracy (DC) party. The Christian Democrats were also supported by the mainstream press, represented by newspapers such as Messaggero Veneto and Giornale di Trieste. In their election campaign the Christian Democrats and their pro-Italian allies ran an anti-Slavic campaign, accusing their communist opponents of being anti-religious. As such the election campaign followed the pattern of the Italian general election of 1948, in which the Christian Democrats and other moderate elements had campaigned on the plank of whipping up fears of a communist takeover of Italy. The Christian Democratic campaign struck a chord especially amongst women voters in the Free Territory, who were allowed to vote for the first time.

The Communist Party of the Free Territory of Trieste (PCTLT), which had initially supported the incorporation of the Free Territory with Yugoslavia, had been divided as a result of the rupture between the USSR and Yugoslavia in 1948. The pro-Yugoslav fraction was now regrouped in the Slovenian-Italian Popular Front (FPIS), with the daily newspaper Primorski dnevnik as their press outlet.

A third force was the Independence Front, which sought to convert the Free Territory into an independent state.

== In Trieste ==
Party	Votes	%	Seats
Christian Democracy	65,627	39.04	25
Communist Party of the Free Territory of Trieste	35,548	21.14	13
Independence Front	11,476	6.83	4
Socialist Party of the Julian March	10,747	6.39	4
Italian Social Movement	10,171	6.05	4
Italian Republican Party	9,081	5.41	3
Italian Bloc	8,252	4.91	3
Trieste Bloc	4,860	2.89	1
Italian-Slovenian Popular Front	3,957	2.35	1
Italian Liberal Party	3,094	1.84	1
Slovenian National List	3,004	1.79	1
Italian Republican Movement	2,291	1.36	0

== Other municipalities ==
The elections in the five smaller municipalities were marked by victories of the Communist Party and its front organization, the Slavic-Italian Anti-Fascist Union. The Communist Party won 57% of the votes in Muggia (8,039 votes, whilst the Titoist FPIS obtained 1,387 votes), and the Slavic-Italian Anti-Fascist Union won 33% of the total vote in Duino-Aurisina, 55% in San Dorligo della Valle, 51% in Sgonico and 97% in Monrupino. These results were heralded by Pravda as a victory for the Communist Party.
