= Autostrada Sistiana-Rabuiese =

Controlled-access highway in Italy

Autostrada Sistiana-Rabuiese

Route information
- Maintained by ANAS
- Length: 10.1 km (6.3 mi)
- Existed: 2008–present

Major junctions
- North end: RA 13 in Italy
- South end: Hitra cesta H5 in Slovenia

Location
- Country: Italy
- Regions: Friuli-Venezia Giulia

Highway system
- Roads in Italy; Autostrade; State; Regional; Provincial; Municipal

Autostrada Sistiana–Rabuiese is an autostrada (Italian for "motorway") 10.1 kilometres (6.3 mi) long without toll, managed by ANAS consisting of two sections connected to each other by the Strada statale 202 Triestina which connects the Raccordo autostradale RA13 in Italy and the Hitra cesta H5 in Slovenia crossing the Italian city of Trieste in Friuli-Venezia Giulia region. The highway does not have a definitive numbering and is therefore devoid of an alphanumeric abbreviation of the type "Ax" or "Axx".

== Route ==
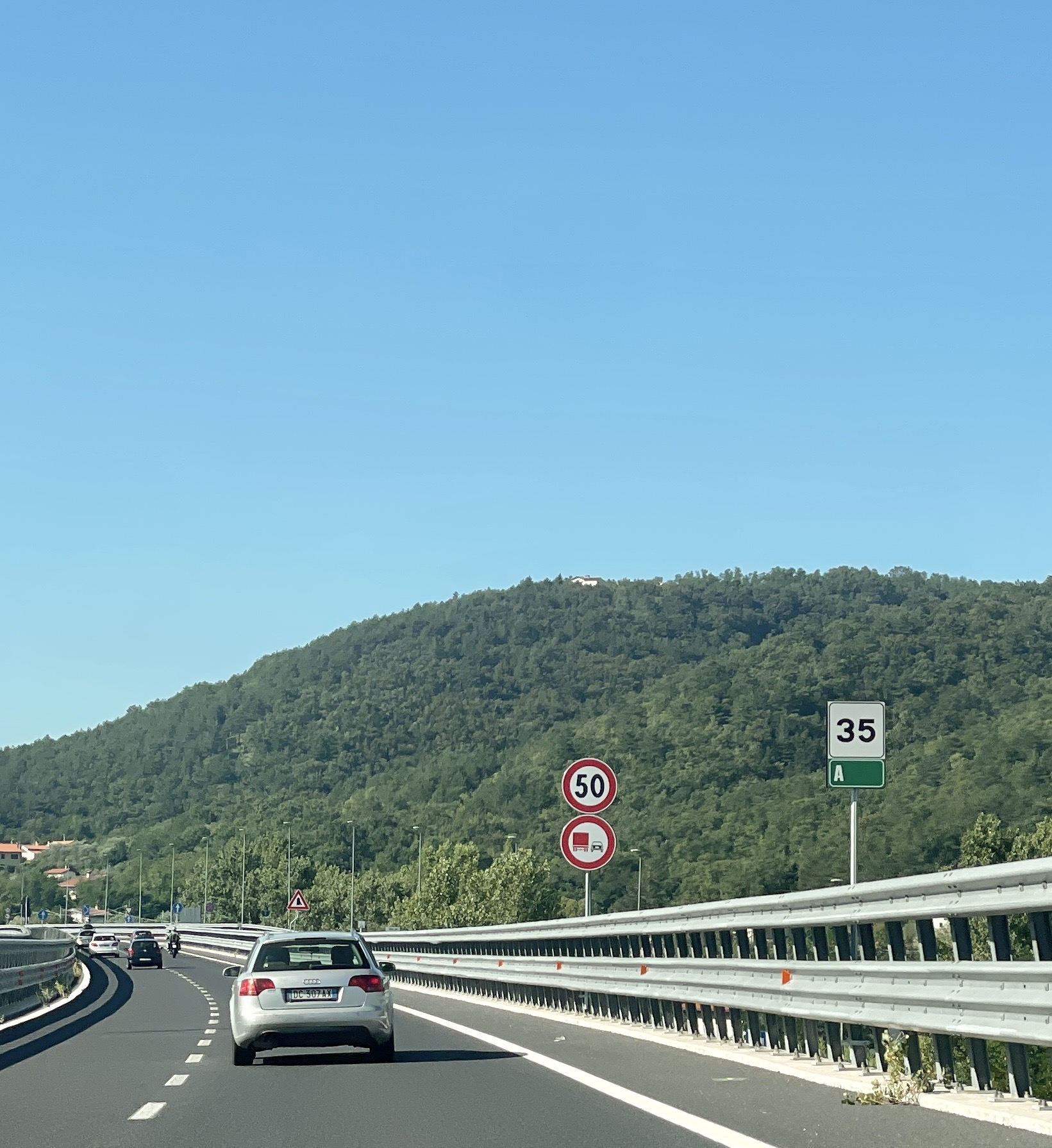
Autostrada Sistiana-Rabuiese near Muggia

SISTIANA–RABUIESE
Exit	↓km↓	↑km↑	Province	European Route
Sistiana-Padriciano	20.6 km (12.8 mi)	16.2 km (10.1 mi)	TS	--
Padriciano; Triestina (Note: Only exit direction SS 202 Triestina, only entry direction Raccordo autostradale RA13)	20.6 km (12.8 mi)	16.2 km (10.1 mi)	TS	--
Cattinara; Triestina (Note: Only exit direction Raccordo autostradale RA13, only entry direction SS 202 Triestina)	25.6 km (15.9 mi)	11.2 km (7.0 mi)	TS	--
Triestina	32.2 km (20.0 mi)	4.6 km (2.9 mi)	TS	--
Muggia	35.6 km (22.1 mi)	1.2 km (0.75 mi)	TS	--
Italy–Slovenia border Hitra cesta H5 Rabuiese-Capodistria	36.8 km (22.9 mi)	0.0 km (0 mi)	TS	--

== See also ==
- Autostrade of Italy
- Roads in Italy
- Transport in Italy

=== Other Italian roads ===
- State highways (Italy)
- Regional road (Italy)
- Provincial road (Italy)
- Municipal road (Italy)
