= Italy–Slovenia border =

International border

Italian–Slovenian border
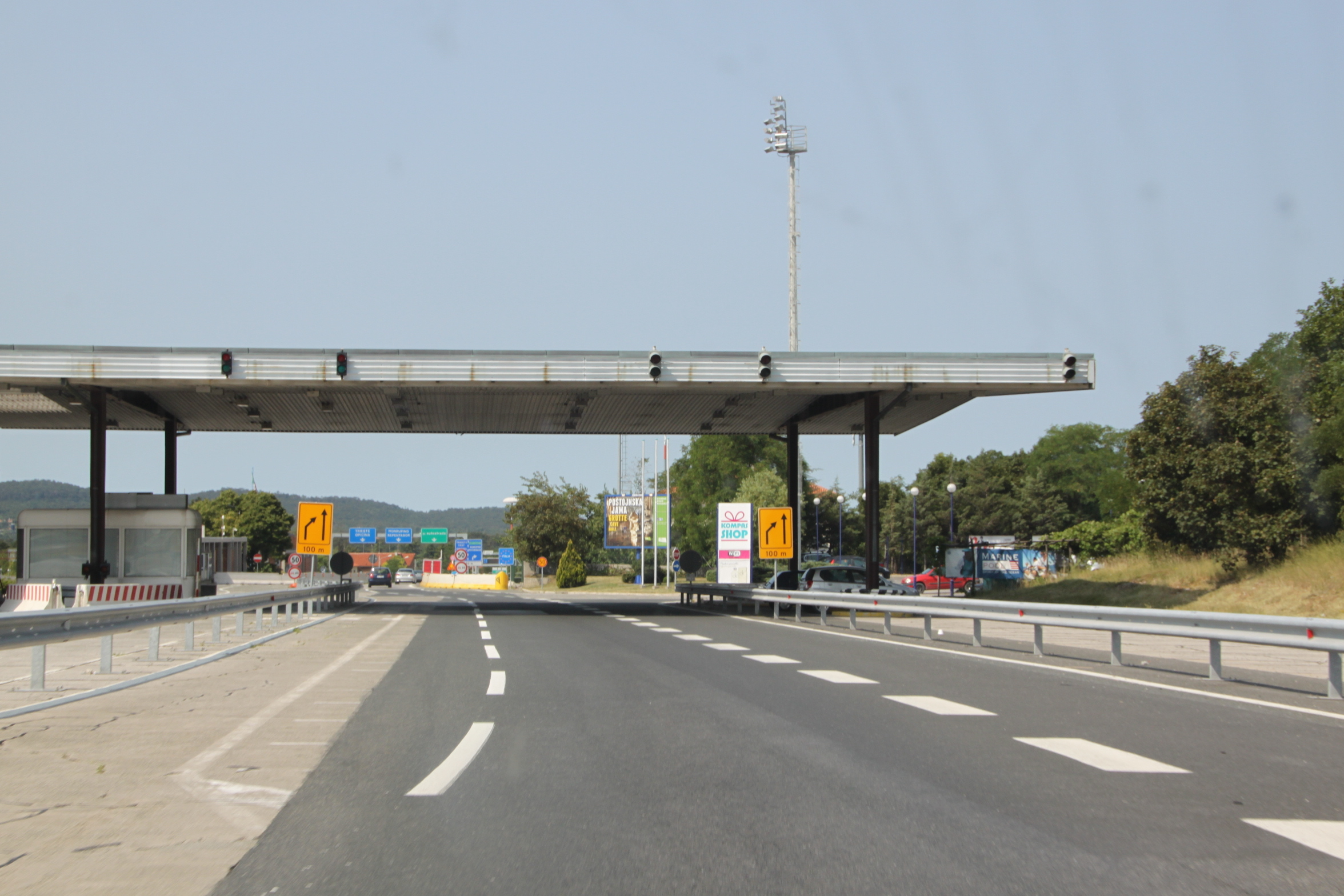
- Border crossing between Fernetti and Sežana

Characteristics
- Entities: Italy Slovenia
- Length: 232 km (144 mi)

History
- Established: 1947
- Treaties: Treaty of Peace with Italy

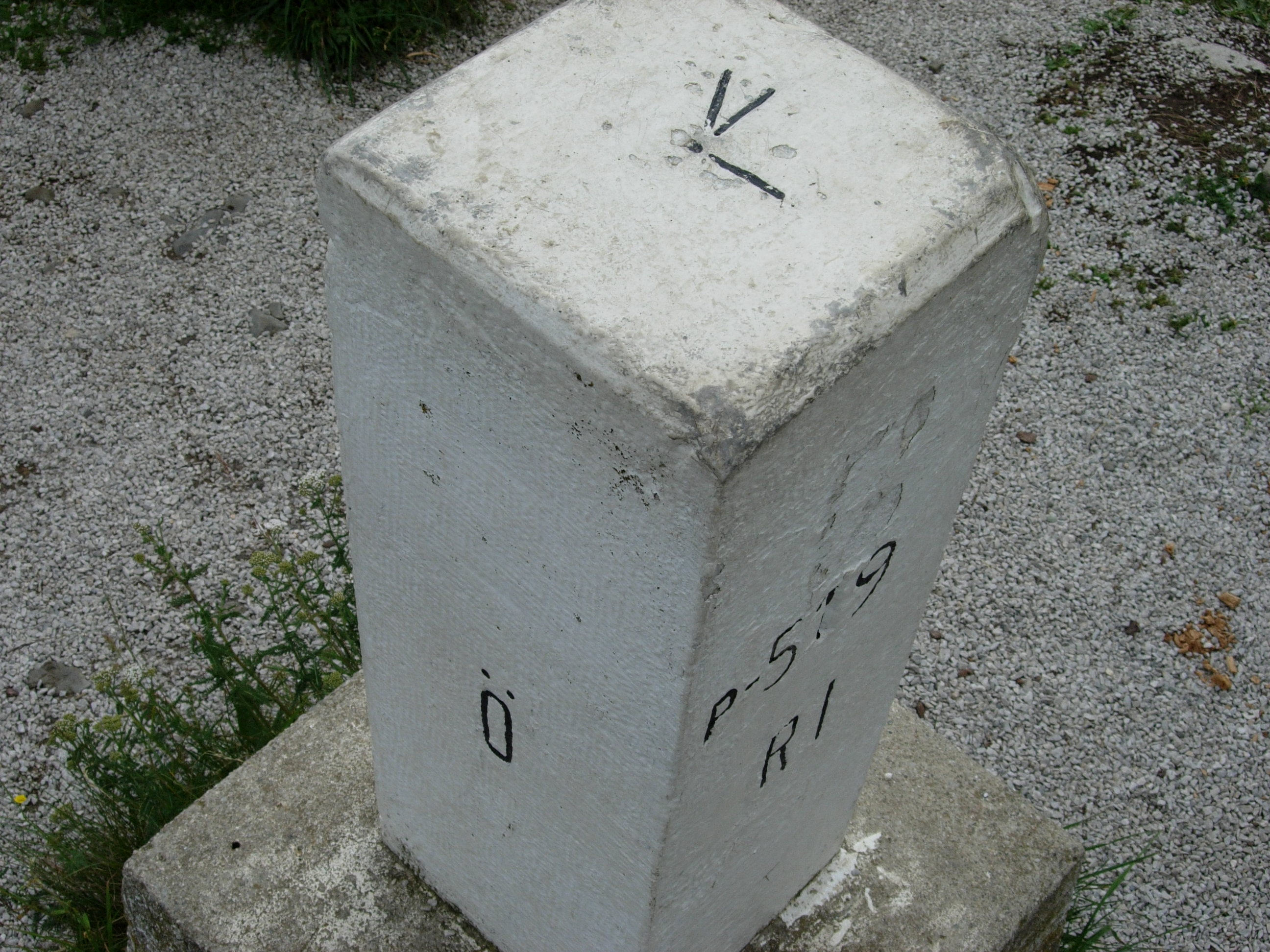
Border tripoint between Italy, Slovenia and Austria, at an altitude of 1,500 metres (4,900 ft)

The Italian–Slovenian border is a 232-kilometre (144 mi) land border between the Republic of Italy and the Republic of Slovenia.

== Path ==
The border starts in the Alps at the tripoint connecting the Austria–Italy border and the Austria–Slovenia border. It ends at the Adriatic Sea.

== Road crossings ==
- SS54 / 202
- SS54 / 203
- SR646 / 401
- SS54 / 102
- SP14 / 402
- Road 402 between Podsabotin and Nova Gorica, both in Slovenia, goes through Italy for 1.6 km (1.0 mi). It was built after the 1975 treaty for Yugoslav usage without border control, but with fences and two bridges over it.
- Several streets in Gorizia (Italy) and Nova Gorica, which lie next to each other.
- A34 / H4
- SP6 / 617
- SR58 / A3 / E61 + E70
- SP10 / 205
- SS14 / E61 / 7
- SP13 / 627
- SS15 / H5
- SP14 / 406

== History ==
Until 1991, it was the border between Italy and Yugoslavia. When Slovenia gained independence in 1991, it became the Italian–Slovenian border. The border has been an EU internal border since 2003 and a Schengen border since 2007.

Between 1920 and 1947 the border between Italy and Kingdom of Yugoslavia went further east. The definition of the border between Italy and Yugoslavia dates back to the Treaty of Peace with Italy, 1947. Some changes were made in 1954 (when the Free Territory of Trieste was divided between Italy and Yugoslavia), 1975 (Treaty of Osimo, some adjustments) and 2017 (slight change to reflect current course of a river).
