= Giardino Botanico Carsiana =

Botanical garden in Italy

Coordinates: 45°43′57″N 13°44′23″E

The Giardino Botanico Carsiana (Carsiana Botanical Garden) is a botanical garden located within the municipality of Sgonico (Zgonik) between the villages of Gabrovizza and Sgonico, Province of Trieste, Friuli-Venezia Giulia, Italy. It is open every morning except Mondays and the afternoons at the weekend and on public holidays between April and mid-October. An admission fee (currently €3,00 - €2,00 reduced) is charged.

The garden was privately created in 1964 to preserve species indigenous to the Carso (Kras) limestone plateau, and in 1972 gained support from the Trieste provincial government that have owned the garden. Its 6,000 m^{2} area currently contains about 600 of the 1600 species native to the local karst environment, including its grasslands and scree. Signs throughout the garden identify individual plants and karst topography features.

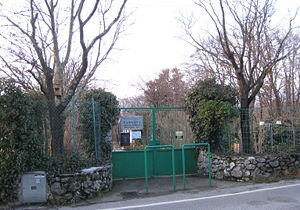
Giardino Botanico Carsiana

== See also ==
- List of botanical gardens in Italy
