= Raccordo autostradale RA13 =

Controlled-access highway in Italy

Raccordo autostradale 13
- Motorway connection 13
- Raccordo autostradale Sistiana-Padriciano; Sistiana-Padriciano motorway connection

Route information
- Part of E70
- Maintained by ANAS
- Length: 21.0 km (13.0 mi)
- Existed: 1970–present

Major junctions
- West end: Sistiana
- A4 in Sistiana
- East end: Padriciano

Location
- Country: Italy
- Regions: Friuli-Venezia Giulia

Highway system
- Roads in Italy; Autostrade; State; Regional; Provincial; Municipal
← RA 12	→ RA 14

Raccordo autostradale 13 (RA 13; "Motorway connection 13"), also called Raccordo autostradale Sistiana-Padriciano ("Sistiana-Padriciano motorway connection"), is an autostrada (Italian for "motorway") 21.0 kilometres (13.0 mi) long in Italy located in the region of Friuli-Venezia Giulia which connects the Autostrada A4 with the Autostrada Sistiana-Rabuiese for the port of Trieste and the Trieste Airport near Padriciano, a hamlet of Trieste, and it is part of the so-called Grande Viabilità Triestina. It is a part of the E70 European route.

== Route ==
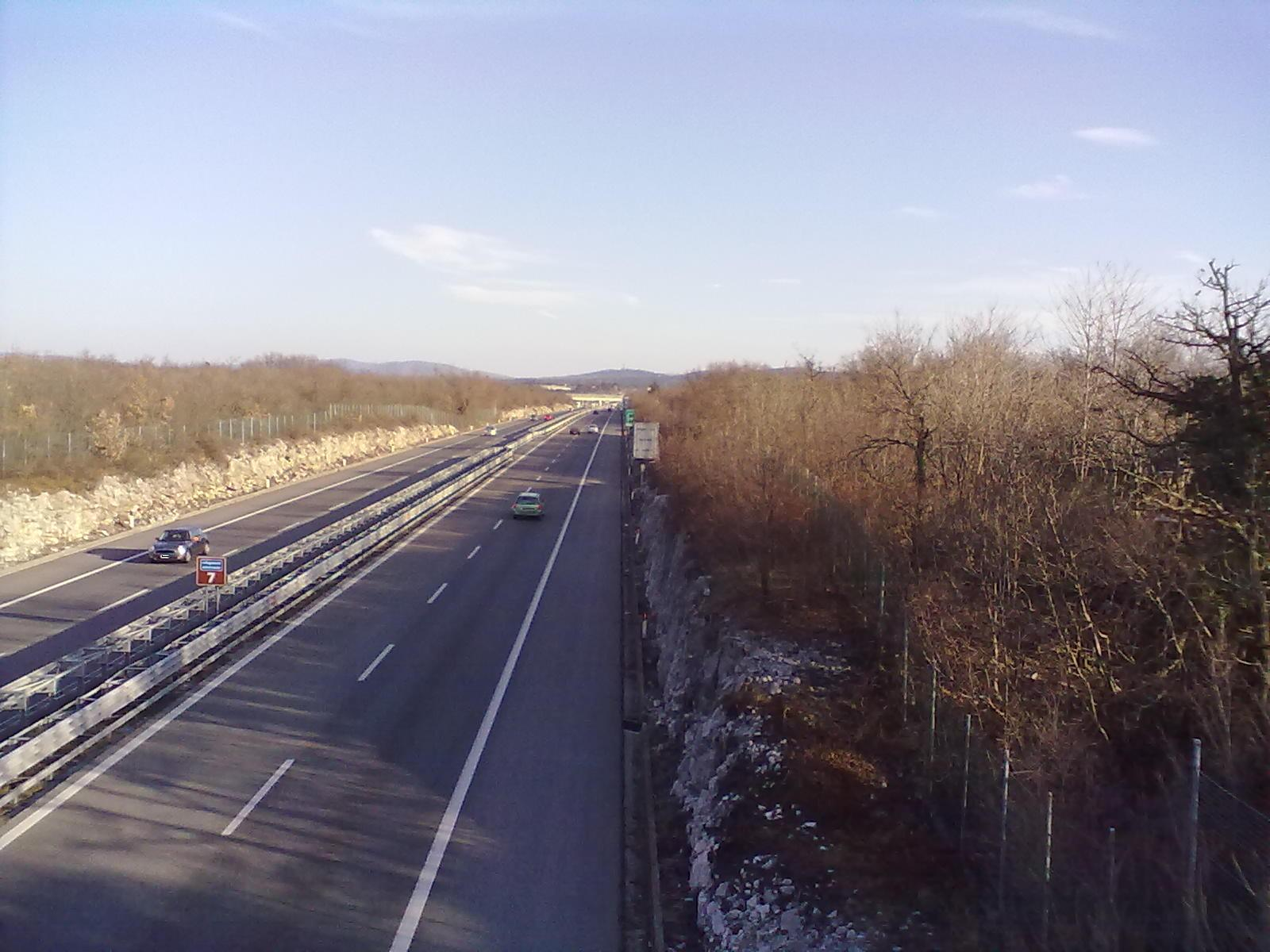
Raccordo autostradale RA13 near Sgonico

RACCORDO AUTOSTRADALE 13; Raccordo autostradale Sistiana-Padriciano
Exit	↓km↓	↑km↑	Responsibility	European Route
Torino - Trieste	0.0 km (0 mi)	21.0 km (13.0 mi)	TS	E70
Rest area	0.4 km (0.25 mi)	20.6 km (12.8 mi)	TS	E70
Sistiana di Sistiana della Venezia Giulia	0.6 km (0.37 mi)	20.4 km (12.7 mi)	TS	E70
Sgonico	8.9 km (5.5 mi)	12.1 km (7.5 mi)	TS	E70
Rest area	10.8 km (6.7 mi)	10.2 km (6.3 mi)	TS	E70
Prosecco - Trieste centro	11.2 km (7.0 mi)	9.8 km (6.1 mi)	TS	E70
Diramazione per Fernetti	16.6 km (10.3 mi)	4.4 km (2.7 mi)	TS	E70
Trebiciano - Opicina	18.8 km (11.7 mi)	2.2 km (1.4 mi)	TS	--
Autostrada Sistiana-Rabuiese; Padriciano; Trieste Airport; Port of Trieste	21.0 km (13.0 mi)	0.0 km (0 mi)	TS	--

== See also ==
- Autostrade of Italy
- Roads in Italy
- Transport in Italy

=== Other Italian roads ===
- State highways (Italy)
- Regional road (Italy)
- Provincial road (Italy)
- Municipal road (Italy)
