= Association of Partisans of the Free Territory of Trieste =

Organization for veterans of World War II

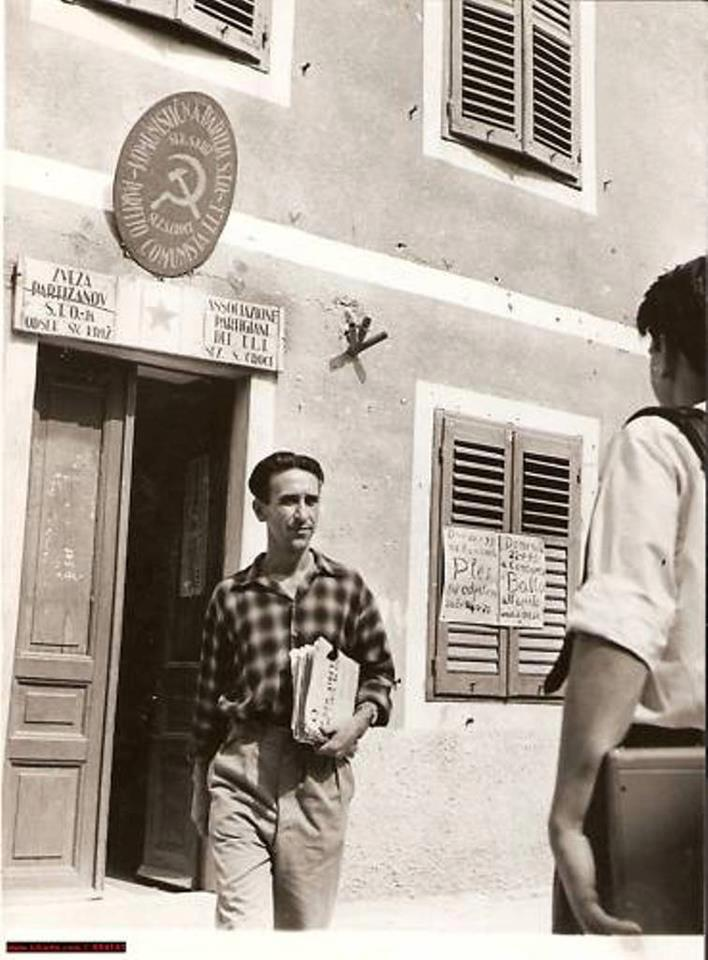
Office in Santa Croce of the local branches of the Communist Party of the Free Territory of Trieste and APTLT

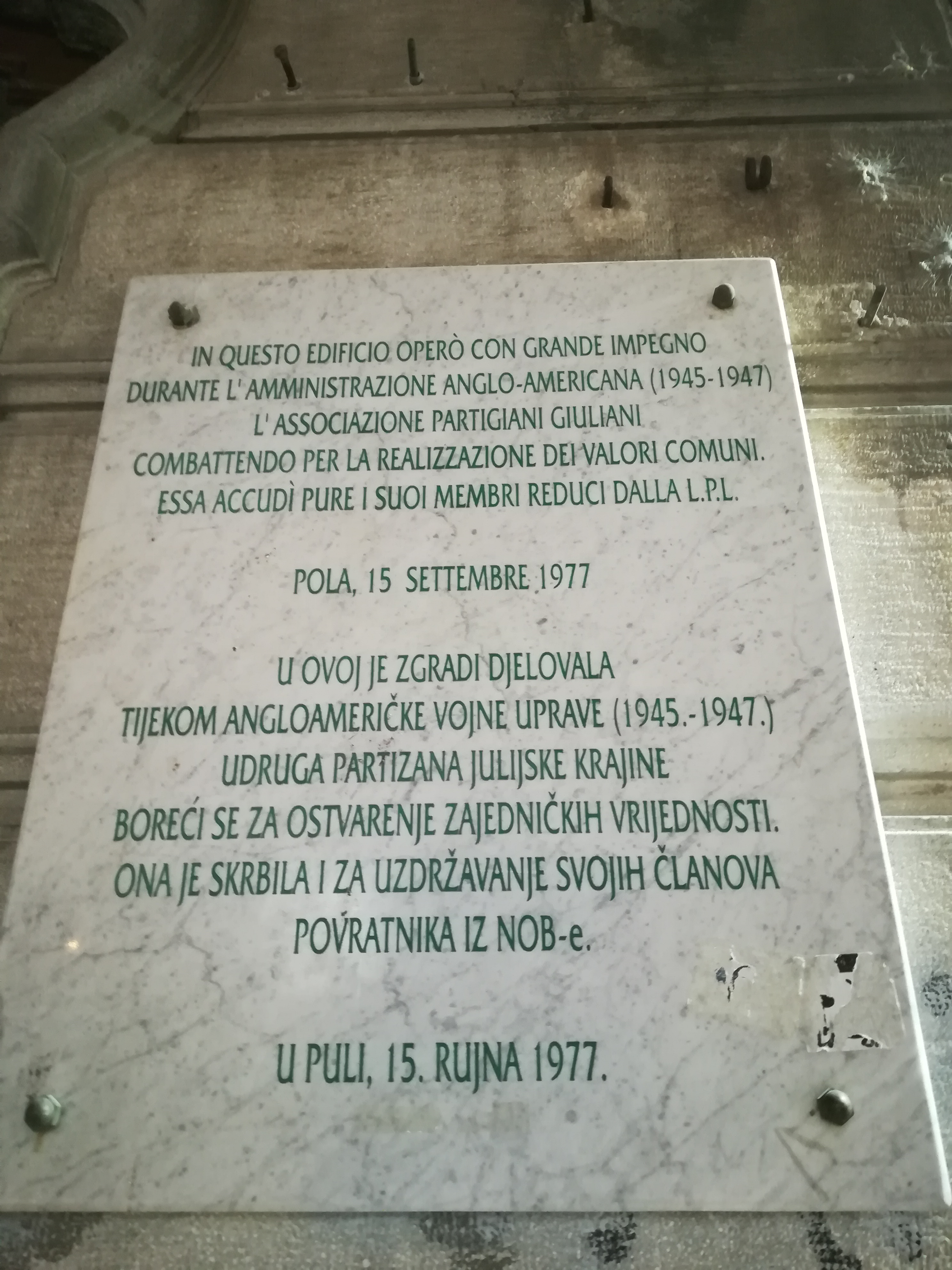
Commemorative plaque in Pula, at the house used as the APG office 1945-1947

The Association of Partisans of the Free Territory of Trieste (Italian: Associazione Partigiani del Territorio Libero di Trieste, abbreviated APTLT, Slovene: Zveza partizanov S.T.O) was an organization in the Free Territory of Trieste for veterans of the World War II anti-fascist partisan movement.

The organization was founded in early August 1945 as the Julian March Partisans' Association (Italian: Associazione Partigiani Giuliani, abbreviated APG, Slovene: Zveza Primorskih partizanov, abbreviated ZPP). There was a competing partisans' association in the area, the Italian Partisans' Association (API) which branded APG-ZPP as 'pro-Slovene'. API was affiliated with the National Partisans' Association of Italy (ANPI).

In 1947 the name Associazione partigiani del T.L.T. - Zveza partizanov S.T.O was adopted. The Soviet-Yugoslav split provoked a division in the organization, leading to the existence of two parallel APTLT associations; one pro-Soviet (known as the 'Vidalian' APTLT) association and one 'Titoist' association. The 'Titoist' APTLT held a conference in January 1950, which elected a Central Committee consisting of Mario Abram, Julij Beltram, Leopold Caharija, Ljubo Černe, Doro Furlanic, Giuseppe Grzancic, Antonio Gurian, Paola Jelcic, Mirko Kosmina, Giuseppe Sancin, Edoardo Krzinič, Emilio Legisa, Bruno Marassut, Erminio Medica, Alberto Pernarčič, Sergij Pečar, Jože Sancin, Jože Sabadin, Mario Santin-Valter, Giordano Sorta, Drago Stoka, Boris Tence, Vittorio Tinelli, Plinio Tomasin and Celestino Valenta.

The 'Vidalian' APTLT merged into ANPI in 1956. The 'Titoist' APTLT lived on until 1964, when it merged into ANPI.
