= Karst Living Museum =

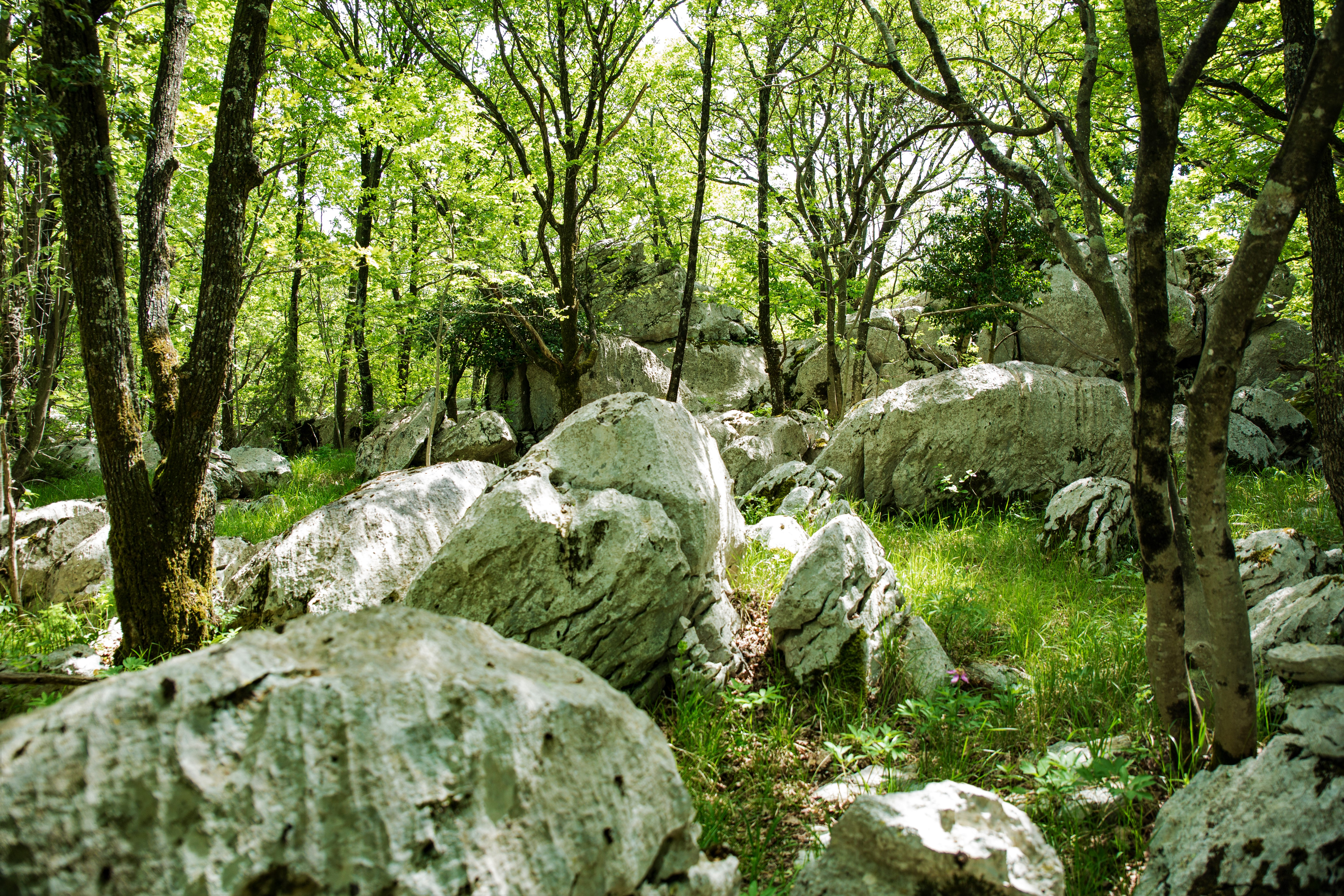
Karst Living Museum

The Karst Living Museum (Slovene: Živi muzej Krasa) is a nature trail in Slovenia. Part of the Karst Plateau, the museum is an ecologically-important area with many karst features. It was recognized as Slovenia's best thematic trail in 2017, and the region is a Natura 2000 site.

== Overview ==
The museum covers over 700 hectares (1,700 acres) between Sežana, Lipica and the Slovene-Italian border, along the old Austro-Hungarian road from Sežana to Bazovizza. The area was closed to the public for almost half a century. Today it includes 20 kilometers (12 mi) of cross-border walking and cycling trails. On the Slovene side, the trail starts near the Sežana fire station. It is located at 45.698931°N 13.870303°E.

== Environment ==
Typical karst phenomena in the area are sinkholes, uvalas, limestone pavement, chasms, and caves. Natural processes created geomorphological features which became characteristic of karst: soluble corrosion of limestone as a consequence of the chemical action of water, carbon dioxide, and organic acids.

Limestone shapes have specific names, such as rills (žlebiči), karrens (škraplje, škraplijšča), kamenitzas (škaune), stone tables known as mushrooms, and hums (osamelci); boulders are known as griže. Other features of karst terrain are shallow valleys (dolinice) and deeper ones, which may be round and elongated or dish- or step-shaped. Small sinkholes are known as vrtače; deeper, larger sinkholes are known as udorne doline. They were created hundreds of thousands of years ago in the Late Pleistocene, during the gradual collapse of cave ceilings.

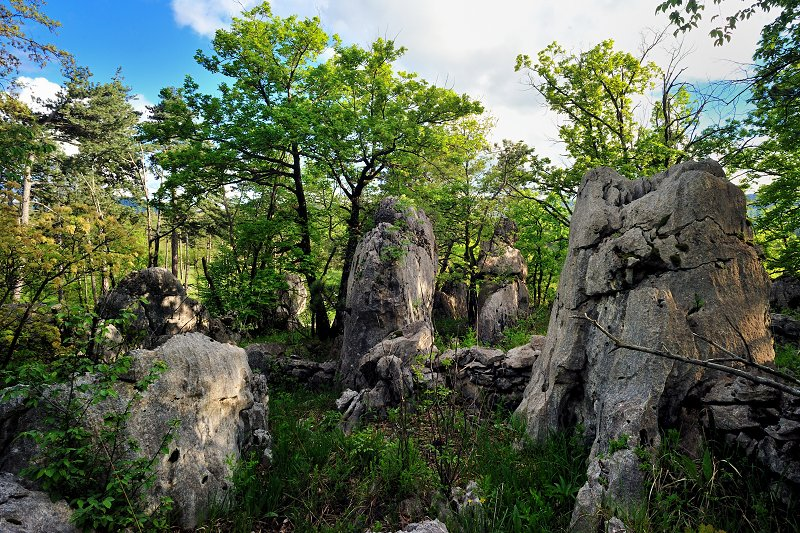
Karst formations

The Golokratna jama cave is a dry sinkhole in the region, which has no surface water. Watercourses disappear below ground, forming caves. The karst caves have a number of calcareous formations, rock shapes and sediments, mainly cave clay. Some underground watercourses have not changed direction. In 2003, explorers from the Sežana Society for Cave Exploration reached the underground Reka River in Kanjaduce Cave and followed it for about 800 meters (2,600 ft). A year later, they reached the Reka at a depth of 340 meters (1,120 ft) through a shaft in the Stršinkna Valley.

== Biodiversity ==
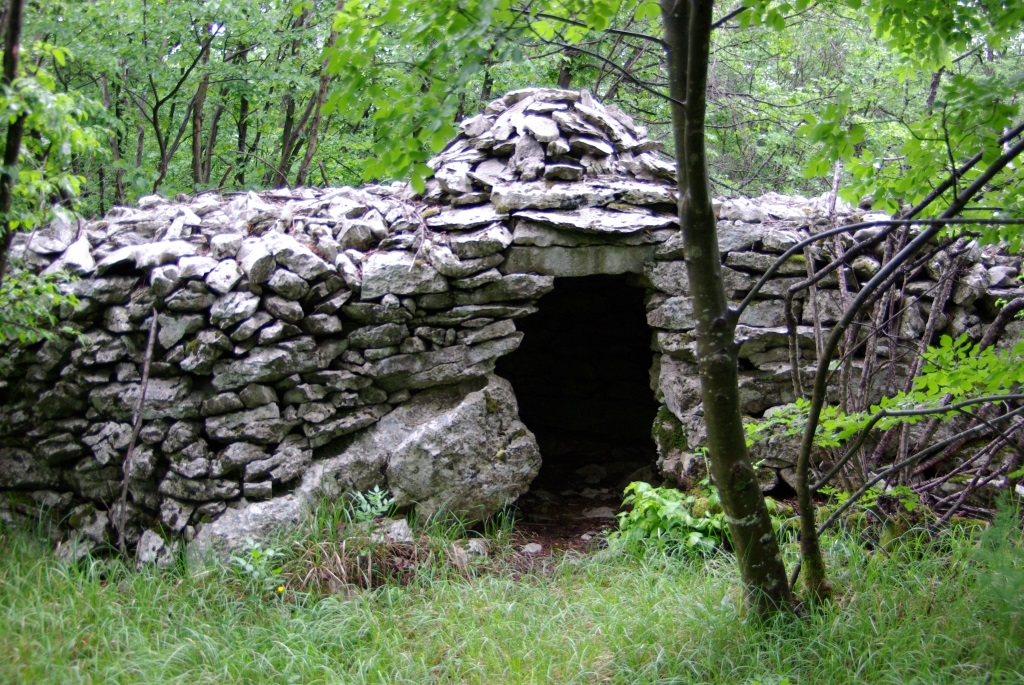
Shepherd's hut

For centuries, the native karst vegetation has resisted the bora and drought on its shallow soil. Biodiversity includes sub-Mediterranean vegetation, with xerophilic Illyrian species and Central European vegetation.

Typical vegetation includes the common houseleek, wild asparagus, mountain anemone, wild peony, and hellebore; crocuses are found in the Lipica area. Cowslips and other high-altitude plants grow on the slopes of Orleška Draga. Other flowers include violets, primroses, lilies of the valley, daffodils, golden daisies, peonies, and cyclamen.

The landscape of Lipica is characterized by several species of oak (downy oak, turkey oak and durmast oak). Mistletoe lives on the trees. Field maples and lindens also grow around the village. Other deciduous trees include the hop and common hornbeam, ash, hazel, and wild cherry. Shrubs include blackthorn, juniper, smoke tree, barberry, common elder and mahaleb cherry.

The karst forest is also home to many animal species, including roe deer, brown hares, squirrels, dormice, badgers, wild boars and common deer. Nocturnal predators include foxes, wild cats, beech marten, weasels, jackals, wolves and brown bears. Birds include the titmouse, nuthatch, jay, black woodpecker, crow, little owl and other rare and endangered species: eagle owl, scops owl, skylark, nightjar, hoopoe, honey buzzard and short-toed snake eagle.

Bats and rock doves live on the rocky slopes. In the dark, underground streams and lakes (including the shaft in the Stršinkna Valley), the olm (Proteus anguina) and other underground fauna have been found.

Karst common land is home to the horned viper, black snake and green, and sand lizard. Grass snakes inhabit ponds; slowworms inhabit cultivated areas, and rat and Aesculapian snakes inhabit abandoned buildings. The region is also home to the green whip snake and common wall lizard.

== History ==
For centuries the only source of water for the karst people were ponds (kali) and wells (štirne), which provided potable water for households and livestock. Ponds were built in natural basins, with the slope leveled and the bottom deepened. A 20-centimetre (7.9 in) layer of clay was laid down and pressed into the soil to seal the bottom. The clay was protected by a stone liner (škrle – flat stones or slate). Cattle pressed the stone as they drank, preserving the seal. Villagers met near ponds, and children skated on the ice in winter. The ponds were used to obtain ice, which was stored in ice houses (ledenice). In summer, the ice was brought to Trieste. A preserved ice house with steps is near the pond at Lipica Stud Farm.

Rainwater was collected in cisterns. The preserved Sežana–Orlek cistern, built on common land (gmajna), has a diameter of about 9 meters (30 ft) and is 3 meters (9.8 ft) deep. A two-sided staircase leads into the cistern. Nineteenth-century cisterns were built in the Štirna Valley and Orlek, which has two: the 1881 cistern and one which is over 250 years old.

A village community well was built in 1880. Rainwater was collected from the nearby roofs and fed through a canal and clay pipes into the well; excess water was collected in a pond. People without a well of their own used water from the village well. Wealthier people built wells on their property. The wells were dug, surrounded by small stones and sealed with clay. The region's water supply was improved with the 1982 construction of a pipeline from Brestovica to Komen.

Stone shepherds' huts are a local example of folk architecture. The huts, which shelter shepherds from wind and rain, are free-standing or built against boulders or walls. Small huts have room for two or three people, and larger huts can accommodate seven.

Dry stone walls, without mortar or other binders, are characteristic of karst architecture. While clearing pastures and meadows, people built walls with the stones they removed. Stone markers denoted administrative boundaries and land ownership.

== Archaeology, paleontology and geology ==
The region is an archaeological site, with findings of fossils, animal bones and ancient artefacts. In the Ludvikova jama cave near Orlek vicinity of Orlek, fossilised Pleistocene animal bones of a wolverine (Gulo gulo, the largest marten, which presently lives in the Arctic and subarctic. Other prehistoric sites are the Jama v Partu pri Ogradi cave, the rock of Krnavica and the Malenca rock shelter, where earthenware, coal and the remains of sheep, goats and deer have been found. In the Jama v sežanski gmajni cave, late-Roman earthenware fragments have been found.

Cretaceous fossils have also been found. A collection of karst, from the over-100-million-year-old Brje limestone formation to the shallow-water rocks of the Povir formation and Komen limestone (with fossils of fish and reptiles) is in the Sežana botanical garden. There is typical rudist limestone, flat limestone with well-preserved fossils and abundant chert, an essential soil ingredient for terrano cultivation. The sedimentation environment was favourable for the creation of thin layers of bituminous coal. The museum also has several layers of flysch.
