= United Trade Unions of the Free Territory of Trieste =

Trieste trade union

- Founded: May 8, 1945
- Dissolved: 1956
- Location: Free Territory of Trieste
- Members: 68,500
- Key people: Ernesto Radich, Emilio Semilli
- Affiliations: WFTU

The United Trade Unions of the Free Territory of Trieste (Italian: Confederazione dei sindacati unici del Territorio libero di Trieste, abbreviated SU Slovene: Zveza enotnih sindikatov Svobodnega tržaškega ozemlja, abbreviated ES), initially called the United Trade Unions of the Julian March (Italian: Sindacati unici della Regione Giulia, Slovene: Enotnih sindikatov Julijske krajine), was a trade union confederation in the Free Territory of Trieste. The confederation was politically connected to the Communist Party of the Free Territory of Trieste (PCTLT/KPSTO).

== Foundation ==
The confederation was established on May 8, 1945, as a continuation of 'Workers Unity' (Delavske enotnosti - Unita' operaia, a group that had been active in Trieste between October 1944 and April 1945). Bruno Fornunat served as the founding president of the organization. A conference held on July 8, 1945 elected a regional committee to lead the organization. The July 8, 1945 conference also adopted a programme of the confederation, calling for Slovenian-Italian brotherhood, improvement of conditions for the working class, reconstruction of destroyed industries and support to the authorities of people's power.

== Organization ==
The organization was divided into five sectors: Trade union organizing, rural, workers sport union, workers unity and cooperative section. In late 1949 a Trade Union Youth Commission was reorganized.

SU/ES had around 68,500 members; 33,700 in the city of Trieste, 18,500 in the surroundings of the city and around 29,000 in the Yugoslav-controlled Zone B. Ernesto Radich and Emilio Semilli served as presidents of the confederation. The organization claimed to have 428 factory committees. SU/ES became an affiliate to the World Federation of Trade Unions in August 1948.

In June 1949, SU/ES signed a treaty of cooperation with the Italian CGIL.

== Development ==
SU/ES conducted a number of political strikes. They were generally directed at the Allied Military Government, but sometimes also targeting pro-Italian organizations. A large section of Italian workers were alienated by the stance of SU/ES, which they often felt was pro-Slovenian. However, in late 1947 the organization managed to negotiate the merger of the pro-Italian Workers' Association, after which the name was changed to 'United Trade Unions of the Free Territory of Trieste'. The organization suffered a split after the condemnation of Yugoslavia by the Cominform in the summer of 1948. The control over the organization was retained by the pro-Cominform sectors.

SU/ES held its fourth congress on April 19–20, 1952 in the city of Trieste. The congress approved new statues for the confederation.

== Merger into CGIL ==
The fifth congress of SU/ES, held January 27–29, 1954 changed the name of the organization to Confederation of Labour of the Free Territory of Trieste (Confederazione del lavoro del Territorio libero di Trieste). An extraordinary congress November 20–21, 1954 approved the affiliation of the confederation to CGIL. In February 1956 a New Confederal Chamber of Labour (NCCdL) was formed, substituting the confederation.
