= Orlek =

- Location in Slovenia
- Coordinates: 45°41′25.06″N 13°50′34.45″E
- Country: Slovenia
- Traditional region: Littoral
- Statistical region: Coastal–Karst
- Municipality: Sežana

Area
  - Total: 3.49 km^{2} (1.35 sq mi)
- Elevation: 346 m (1,135 ft)

Population (2002)
  - Total: 169
- Time zone: CET
- Postal code: 6210
- Area code: 05
- Website: Orlek.si Orlek Official Website

Orlek (pronounced [ˈoːɾlɛk]; Italian: Orle) is a village in the Municipality of Sežana in the Littoral region of Slovenia on the border with Italy.
