= Anti-Fascist Youth Union of the Free Territory of Trieste =

Post-World War II youth movement

The Anti-Fascist Youth Union of the Free Territory of Trieste (Italian: Unione gioventù antifascista del Territorio libero di Trieste, abbreviated UGA, Slovene: Zveza antifašistične mladine Svobodnega tržaškega ozemlja, abbreviated ZAMSTO), initially known as the Anti-Fascist Youth Union of the Julian March (Italian: Unione gioventù antifascista della Regione Giulia, Slovene: Zveze antifašistične mladine Julijske krajine, abbreviated ZAMJK) was a youth movement in the Julian March (later the Free Territory of Trieste). It was active between 1945 and 1954.

The union was formed as a continuation of Italian and Slovenian anti-fascist youth groups in the area by the end of World War II. Amongst the groups that merged into the Anti-Fascist Youth Union of the Julian March were the Young Front from Gradisca d'Isonzo, the Anti-Fascist Youth Union from Gorizia, and anti-fascist youth groups from Trieste, Istria, Rijeka, and Pula. An Italian-Slovenian youth conference had been held on September 2, 1945. It was followed by the founding conference of the Anti-Fascist Youth Union of the Julian March on November 1, 1945, at which the merger of the different groups was completed. The Anti-Fascist Youth Union of the Julian March was formed as an integral part of the Slavic-Italian Anti-Fascist Union.

The Anti-Fascist Youth Union was closely linked to the Communist Youth Federation of the Julian March (the youth wing of the Communist Party of the Julian March). The organizers of the Anti-Fascist Youth Union were generally cadres of the Communist Youth Federation. The Anti-Fascist Youth Union was divided into sections for students, working youth, young farmers, and pioneers.

== Political activities ==
Politically, the Anti-Fascist Youth Union campaigned for integration of the region into Yugoslavia. The organization mobilized youth to participate in labour brigades for the post-war reconstruction of Yugoslavia. The organization also organized sporting and cultural events.

Once the Free Territory of Trieste had been formed, the name of the organization was changed to Anti-Fascist Youth Union of the Free Territory of Trieste. The organization held a congress in December 1947. In the Yugoslav-controlled Zone B, the name of the movement was changed to Slovenian Youth Union of the Free Territory of Trieste (Zvezo slovenske mladine Svobodnega tržaškega ozemlja).

The Anti-Fascist Youth Union of the Free Territory of Trieste was disbanded in 1954. However, the importance of the organization had decreased much earlier, as its activities decreased after the Cominform resolution of June 1948.
