= Gabrovizza =

Coordinates: 45°44′N 13°44′E

Gabrovizza Gabrovec
- Frazione
- Location of Gabrovizza in Italy
- Country: Italy
- Region: Friuli-Venezia Giulia
- Province: Province of Trieste (TS)
- Comune: Sgonico
- Demonym: Gabroučani
- Time zone: UTC+1 (CET)
  - Summer (DST): UTC+2 (CEST)
- Postal code: 34010

Gabrovizza (Italian) or Gabrovec (Slovene) is a village in the Comune of Sgonico/Zgonik (Province of Trieste) in the Italian region Friuli-Venezia Giulia, located about 10 kilometres (7 mi) northwest of Trieste, on the border with Slovenia.

== Name ==
Gabrovec in Slovene means Ostrya carpinifolia (European hop-hornbeam) or in general bush or tree.

== Points of interest ==
- Info

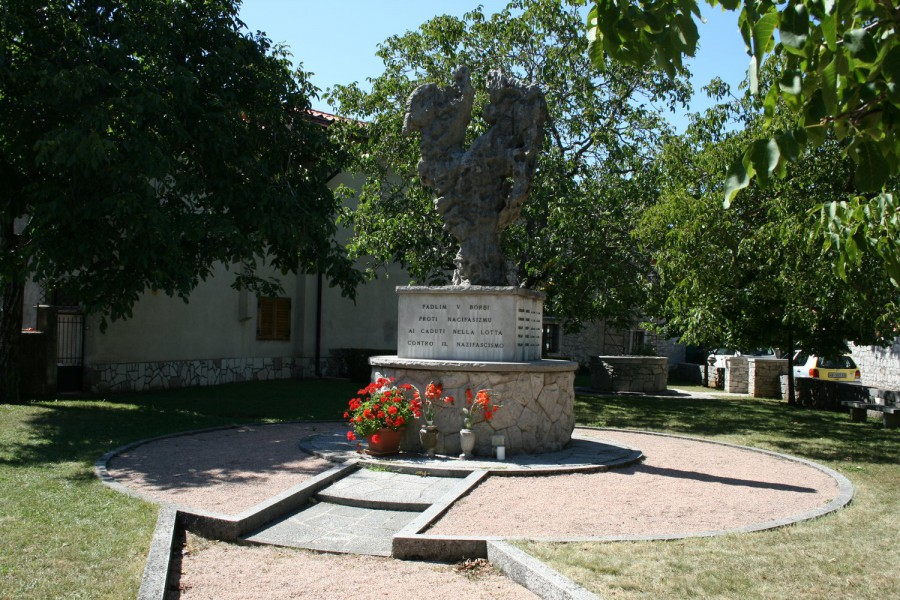
Bilingual (Slovene-Italian) memorial to the fallen in the struggle against Nazi Fascism

== See also ==
- Karst Plateau
- Slovenes in Italy
