= Gabrk, Ilirska Bistrica =

Gabrk
- Village
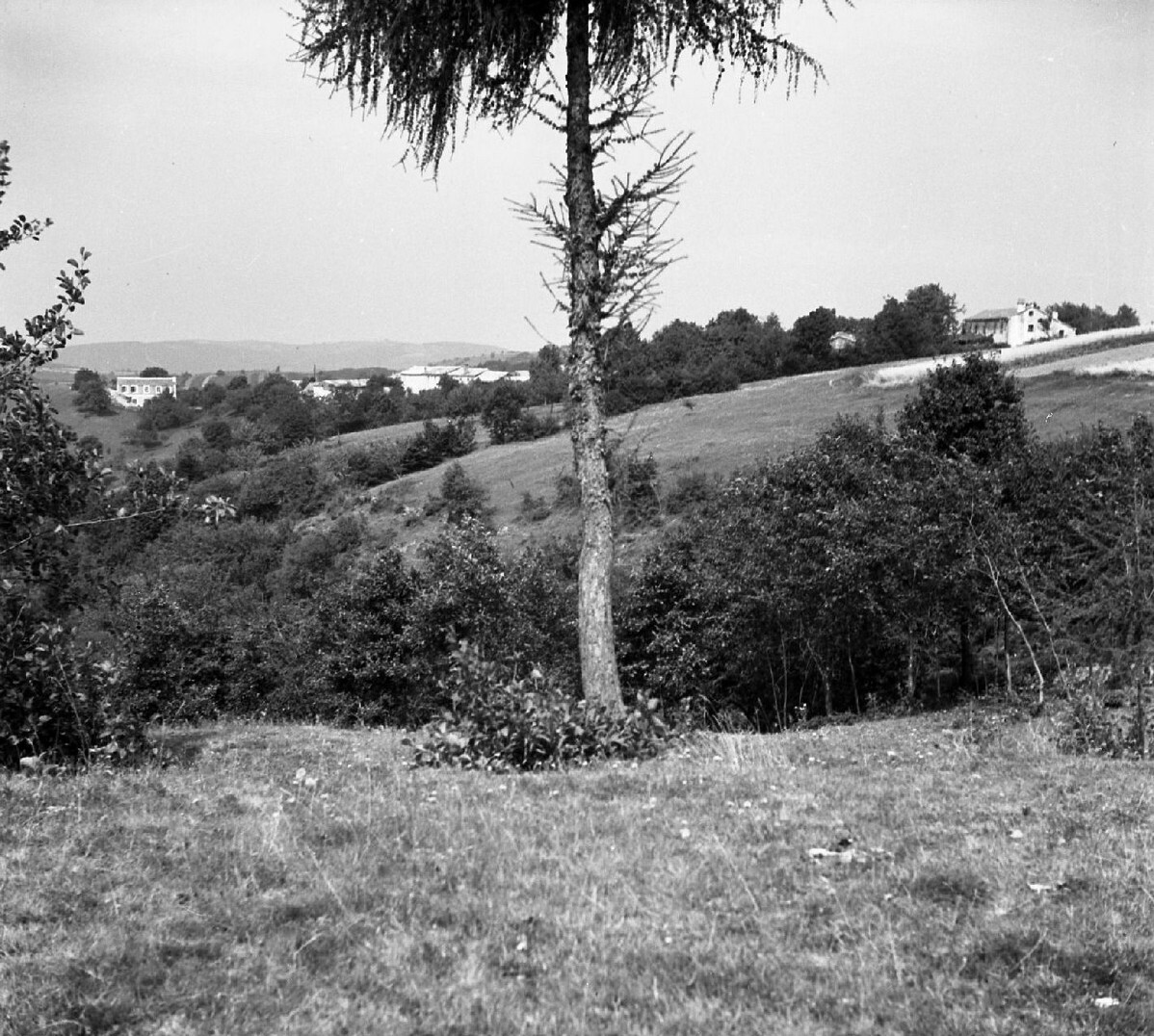
- Gabrk in 1955

- Location in Slovenia
- Coordinates: 45°34′56.3″N 14°6′50.76″E
- Country: Slovenia
- Traditional region: Inner Carniola
- Statistical region: Littoral–Inner Carniola
- Municipality: Ilirska Bistrica

Area
  - Total: 1.67 km^{2} (0.64 sq mi)
- Elevation: 742.8 m (2,437 ft)

Population (2002)
  - Total: 33

Gabrk (pronounced [ˈɡaːbəɾk]; Italian: Gabrega) is a small village west of Pregarje in the Municipality of Ilirska Bistrica in the Inner Carniola region of Slovenia.

The local church in the settlement is dedicated to the Holy Trinity and belongs to the Parish of Pregarje.
