= Monrupino =

Monrupino Repentabor (Slovene)
- Comune
- Comune di Monrupino; Občina Repentabor
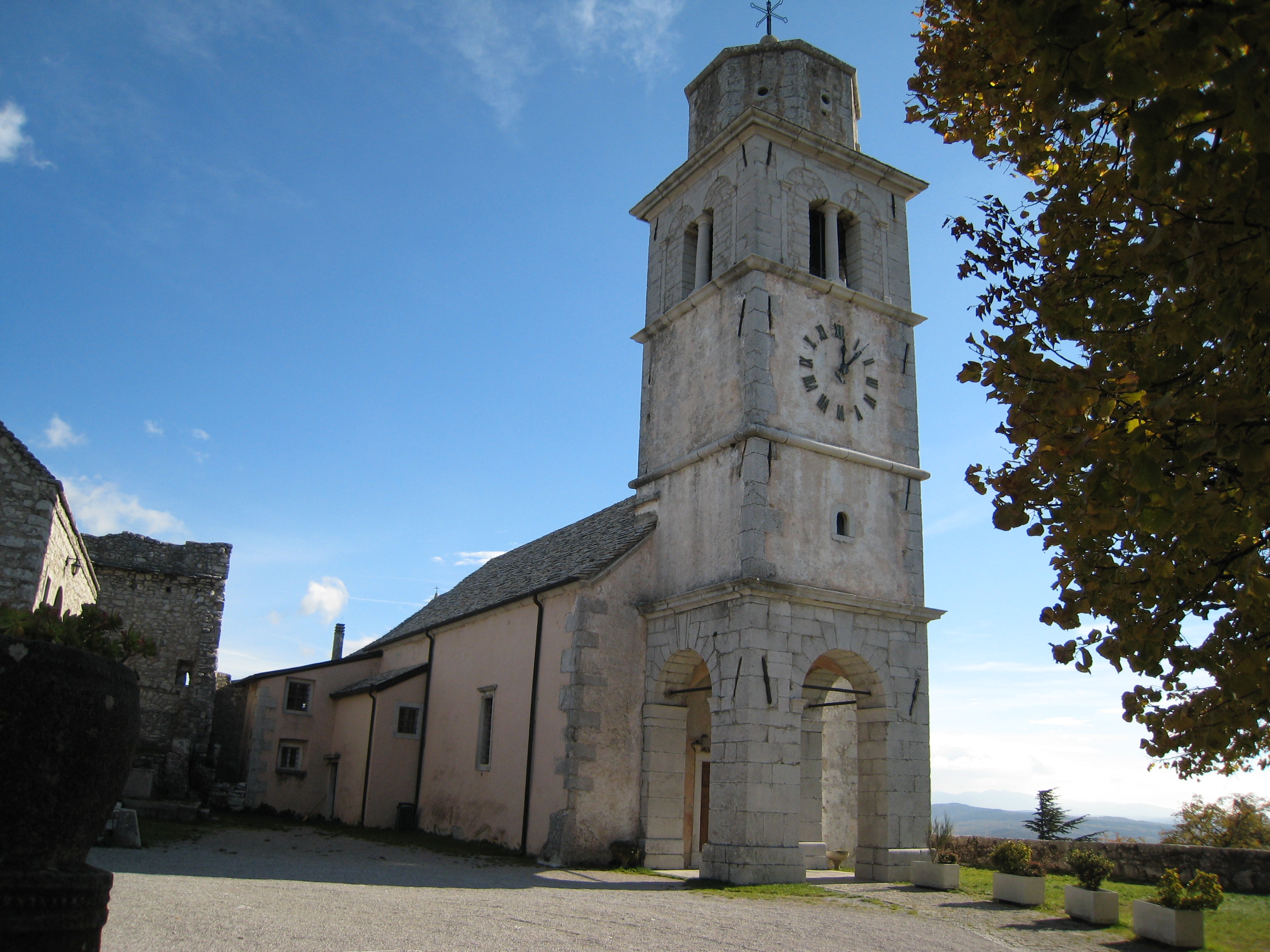
- Church in Monrupino
- Interactive map of Monrupino
- Location within Italy Location within Friuli-Venezia Giulia
- Coordinates: 45°43′N 13°47′E
- Country: Italy
- Region: Friuli-Venezia Giulia
- Province: Trieste (TS)
- Frazioni: Fernetti/Fernetiči, Col, Repen

Government
  - Mayor: Tanja Kosmina (Slovenska skupnost)

Area
  - Total: 12.7 km^{2} (4.9 sq mi)
- Elevation: 418 m (1,371 ft)

Population (July 2025)
  - Total: 839
  - Density: 66.1/km^{2} (171/sq mi)
- Time zone: UTC+1 (CET)
  - Summer (DST): UTC+2 (CEST)
- Postal code: 34016
- Dialing code: 040
- Website: www.comune.monrupino.ts.it

Monrupino (Slovene: Repentabor) is a comune (municipality) in the Regional decentralization entity of Trieste in the Italian region of Friuli-Venezia Giulia, located about 9 kilometres (5.6 mi) north of Trieste, on the border with Slovenia. As of 31 July 2025, it had a population of 839 and an area of 12.7 square kilometres (4.9 mi^{2}). According to the 1971 census, 77.3% of the population are Slovenes.

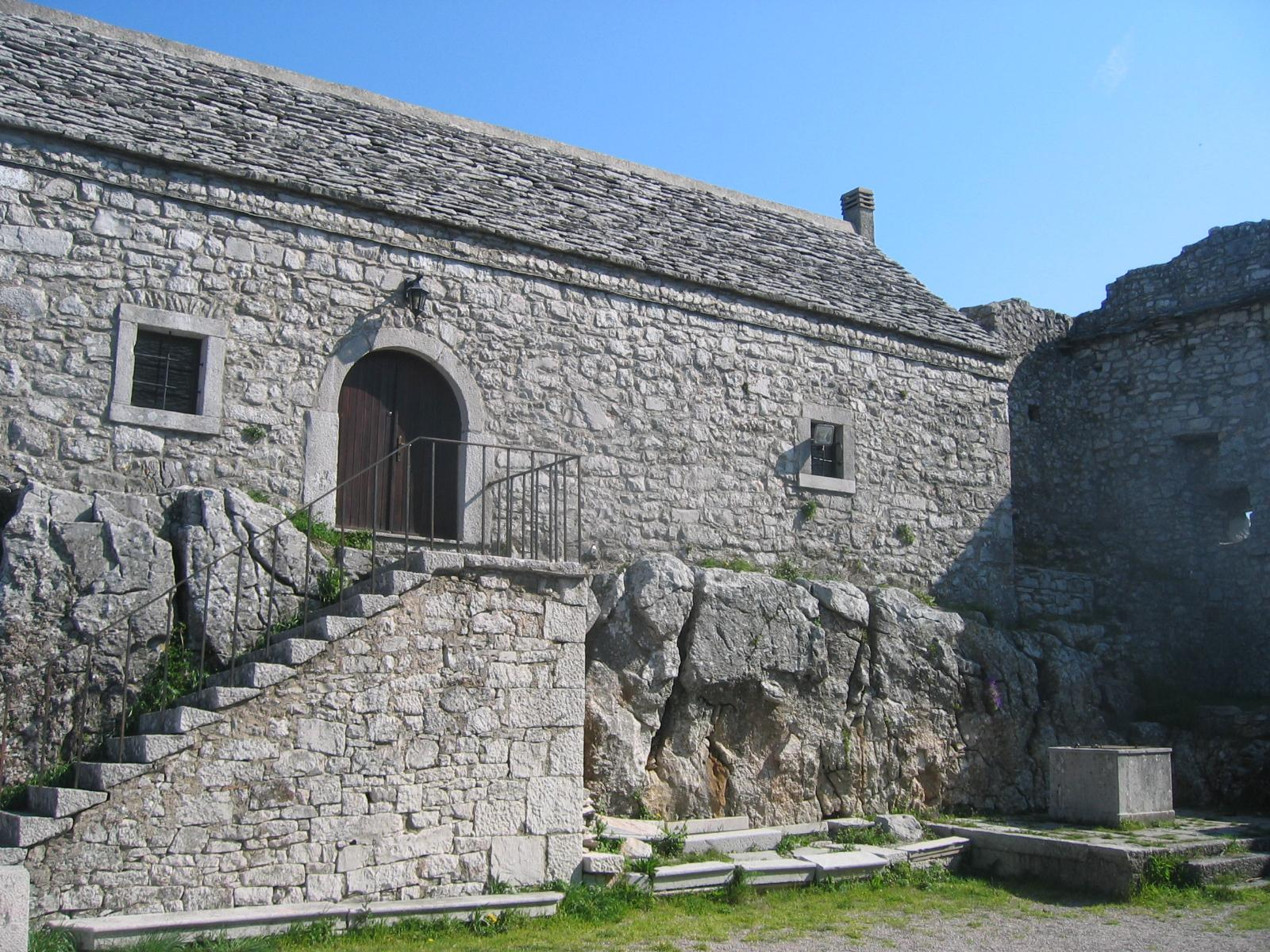
Parish house (inside the Monrupino/Tabor Fortress)

The municipality of Monrupino contains the frazioni (boroughs) Fernetti/Fernetiči, Col, Repen.

Monrupino borders the following municipalities: Trieste, Sgonico, Sežana (Slovenia).

== Demographic evolution ==
Historical population

Year	Pop.	±%
1921	572	—
1931	550	−3.8%
1936	563	+2.4%
1951	572	+1.6%

Year	Pop.	±%
1961	640	+11.9%
1971	702	+9.7%
1981	834	+18.8%
1991	847	+1.6%

Year	Pop.	±%
2001	868	+2.5%
2011	881	+1.5%
2021	857	−2.7%

Source: Data from ISTAT

== Politics ==
Traditionally, Monrupino has been a left-leaning municipality. In the 1950s and 1960s, it was part of the so-called "red belt" around Trieste: that is, of those municipalities around the city dominated by the Communist Party. In June 1949, in the first municipal elections in the Free Territory of Trieste, the Communist-led Slavic-Italian Anti-Fascist Union won 97% of the votes. The election result was heralded by the Soviet press as a victory for the Communist Party.

Since the 1970s, the centrist party of the Slovene minority in Italy, the Slovene Union, started gaining support. In the last few decades, the Slovene Union and the Italian leftist party (the Democratic Party, before the Democrats of the Left and before them the Communist Party) alternate in power. Currently, the municipality is led by a mayor of the Slovene Union, which is also the largest party in the Municipal Council (with around 45% of votes).

== Landmarks ==
It is worth mentioning the Karst House in Repen a preserved traditional Karst house that displays antique furniture and living spaces. Among events, the Karst Wedding (Kraška ohcet) stands out; it is organized every other year (in odd-numbered years) on the last Sunday of August in the fortified church above the village and in the village itself.

The Repen Walls

The Repen Walls are stone monoliths up to 10 meters high, standing at the top of a slope beneath the Tabor hill along the road toward the village of Col. They are composed of limestone, mainly made up of crushed shell fragments bound together by calcite. The walls are a natural phenomenon of particular geomorphological significance, formed through chemical dissolution caused by meteoric water and the area’s specific geographic position. Rocks made of shelly limestone are less susceptible to the aggressive action of water and thus now remain as isolated pillars, while the surrounding, more soluble limestone surface has dissolved away. In addition, these stone blocks are located at the top of a mountain pass, where dissolution is more intense: insoluble residues of carbonate rocks do not remain in place, resulting in a greater height difference between the shelly limestone formations and the surrounding surface. On one of these monoliths, a memorial plaque is installed in honor of the victims of fascism.

History of the Tabor Church

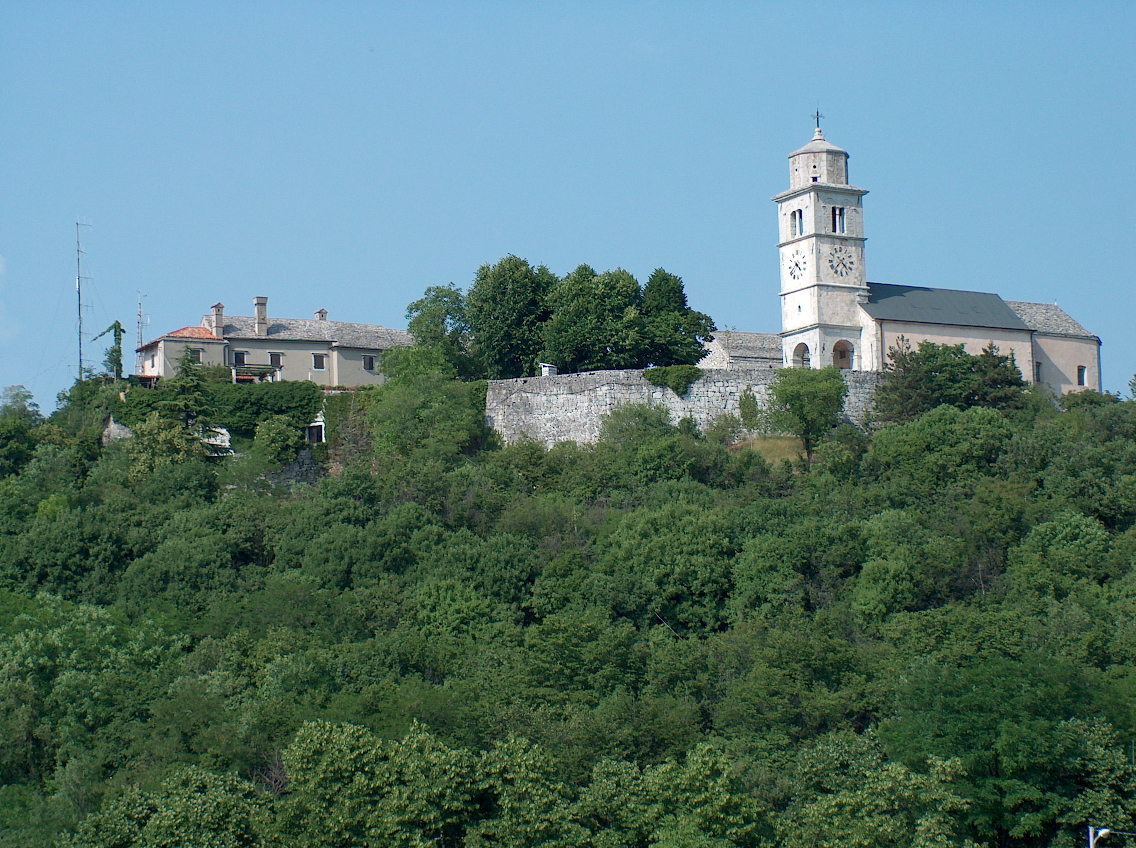

The ruins in the surrounding area testify to the site’s turbulent past. On the slopes of the Tabor hill, the remains of a hillfort from the middle of the second millennium BCE are still visible. In Roman times, a road leading from Trieste eastward passed below Tabor. From this period, the remains of a defensive tower by the main entrance to Repen and traces of a triple line of fortifications on the slope can still be seen.

At the western entrance to the Tabor complex, there is a Slovenian inscription from 1828, written in the Bohorič alphabet, stating that Tabor was rebuilt in the year 911, during the time of Hungarian incursions. The Repen church is first mentioned in a diocesan document from 1316. This document also lists the (Slovenian) names of some nearby villages and is a valuable record of the uninterrupted presence of Slovenes in this area. The renovated and enlarged church was consecrated in 1512 by the Bishop of Trieste, Peter Bonomo, a friend and patron of Primož Trubar. During the period of Turkish raids, the church was restored and fortified with walls, as evidenced by the date 1559 inscribed at the entrance to the parish house.

The church acquired its present appearance in 1750; construction at that time was led by the parish priest Klepše from Tomaj. In 1794, the Bishop of Trieste, Sigmund von Hohenwart, donated an altarpiece of Mary to the church, a work by the Trieste painter Maria Candido, which still adorns the main altar today. In addition to the church (within the walls), there stand the parish house and a building that once served as the seat of the Repen srenja (a form of local self-government). Repen was once a fairly important local pilgrimage destination. On the Feast of the Assumption, numerous processions would once wind their way toward Repen from Trieste, Sežana, and many smaller settlements on the Karst. Visitors also enjoy visiting the parish church for its exceptional views across the Karst, toward the sea, and toward the Karawanks and the Alps in the distance.

== See also ==
- Karst Plateau
- Gorizia and Gradisca
- Julian March
- Slovene Lands
