= Sgonico =

Sgonico Zgonik (Slovene)
- Comune
- Comune di Sgonico; Občina Zgonik
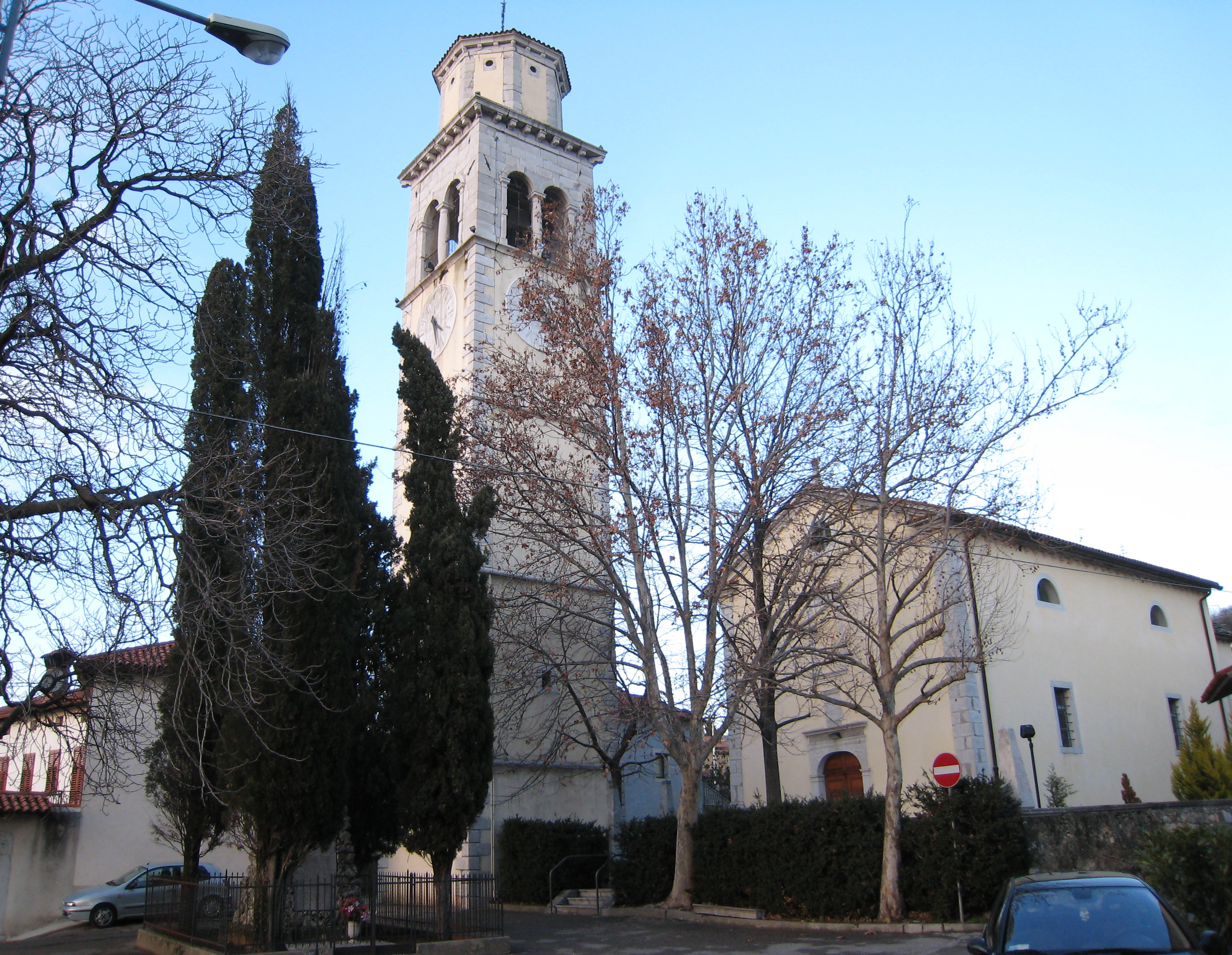
- Parish church in Sgonico
- Interactive map of Sgonico
- Location within Italy Location within Friuli-Venezia Giulia
- Coordinates: 45°44′N 13°45′E
- Country: Italy
- Region: Friuli-Venezia Giulia
- Province: Trieste (TS)
- Frazioni: Bristie (Brišče), Borgo Grotta Gigante (Briščiki), Campo Sacro (Božje Polje), Colludrozza (Koludrovica), Devincina (Devinščina), Gabrovizza San Primo (Gabrovec), Rupinpiccolo (Repnič), Sagrado di Sgonico (Zagradec), Sales (Salež), Samatorza (Samatorca), Sgonico (Zgonik)

Government
  - Mayor: Monica Hrovatin

Area
  - Total: 31.3 km^{2} (12.1 sq mi)

Population (July 2025)
  - Total: 1,956
  - Density: 62.5/km^{2} (162/sq mi)
- Time zone: UTC+1 (CET)
  - Summer (DST): UTC+2 (CEST)
- Postal code: 34010
- Dialing code: 040
- Website: Official website

Sgonico (Slovene: Zgonik; Triestine: Sgonico) is a comune (municipality) in the Regional decentralization entity of Trieste in the Italian region of Friuli-Venezia Giulia, located about 12 kilometres (7 mi) northwest of Trieste, on the border with Slovenia. As of 31 July 2025, it had a population of 1,956 and an area of 31.3 square kilometres (12.1 mi^{2}). According to the 1971 census, 81.6% of the population are Slovenes.

Sgonico borders these municipalities: Duino-Aurisina, Monrupino, Sežana (Slovenia), and Trieste.

== Name ==
The name of the settlement was first attested in 1309 as Swonich (and as de Svonicho in 1348, de Vonicho in 1373, de Champanilo in 1374, de villa Svonich in 1421, Suonich and de Suonigo in 1525, and Sgonico in 1819). The name is of Slovene origin, derived from the Slovene common noun zvonik, "belfry", (in reference to the church of Saint Michael). The phonological change zvonik to zgonik is characteristic of the local Slovene dialect; cf. also dialect zgon, "bell", from zvon.

== Geography ==
=== Territory ===
The municipality occupies a central portion of the Trieste Karst, and both its flora and fauna are typically karst. Roughly rectangular in shape, it is bordered to the east by a row of low-lying hills that mark the border with Slovenia. The highest point is Mount Lanaro (544 m). The western part of the territory is flat, but dotted with numerous sinkholes, some of which are large. The only surface water bodies are a few small ponds.

=== Climate ===
Based on the 30-year reference average from 1961 to 1990, the average temperature of the coldest month, January, is 3.0 °C (37.4 °F), while that of the warmest month, July, is 21.4 °C (70.5 °F).

Precipitation exceeds 1,200 mm (47 in), distributed over an average of 100 days, with peaks in autumn and spring and relative lows in winter and summer.

== History ==
After the First World War the territory passed to Italy and, in 1923, was included in the province of Trieste, that was restored on 2019 in the form of a regional decentralization entity.

== Monuments and places of interest ==
=== Religious Architecture ===
- Parish Church of San Michele Arcangelo in Sgonico
- Church of Sant'Ulderico in Samatorza
- Church of San Massimiliano Kolbe (privately owned) in Borgo Grotta Gigante-Girandole
- Chapel of San Primo in Gabrovizza

=== Other places ===
- Grotta Gigante
- Giardino Botanico Carsiana
- Gabrovizza / Gabrovec
- Mount Lanaro Nature Reserve
- Riselce Trail
- Castelliere di Rupinpiccolo
- The Osmize

== Demographic evolution ==
Historical population

Year	Pop.	±%
1921	1,522	—
1931	1,387	−8.9%
1936	1,392	+0.4%
1951	1,316	−5.5%

Year	Pop.	±%
1961	1,318	+0.2%
1971	1,394	+5.8%
1981	2,085	+49.6%
1991	2,207	+5.9%

Year	Pop.	±%
2001	2,185	−1.0%
2011	2,077	−4.9%
2021	1,999	−3.8%

Source: Data from ISTAT

=== Languages and dialects ===
The municipal statute guarantees equal status to the Slovenian language and its use alongside Italian in official documents and in relations with municipal institutions. Sgonico is included in the list of municipalities in which measures for the protection of the Slovenian-speaking minority apply, pursuant to Article 4 of Law No. 38 of 23 February 2001, "Regulations for the Protection of the Slovenian Linguistic Minority in the Friuli-Venezia Giulia Region." In 1971, the population was overwhelmingly Slovenian-speaking:

- Linguistic Distribution (Main Groups)

18.40% Italian-speaking, 81.60% Slovenian-speaking. According to a 1983 government estimate, 54% of the population in the municipality of Sgonico was Slovenian-speaking.

== Economy ==
The local economy was based on agriculture (primarily livestock farming), a fact hampered by the harsh environmental conditions of the Karst. During the 19th century, mining activity developed, with the opening of numerous marble quarries.

Two big Hi-Tech Companies have their EMEA global or national headquarters located in Sgonico: Telit and ex U-blox, both of them located near Stazione di Prosecco, the biggest and more important area of manufacturing and services companies in Sgonico. Other small realities are mainly working in the crafts and freight forwarders (transportation) area close to Stazione di Prosecco and Industrial Zone (Zona Artigianale - Sgonico/Zgonik).

=== Tourism ===
- Giant Cave with its amphitheater of stalactites and stalagmites (the tallest stalagmite in the cave is 12 m and it is called Roger column), place of interest in caving and paleontological discovery in 1840.
- Botanical Garden "Carsiana": it's a split in different geo-climatic habitat that exemplifies the entire biodiversity of the flora of the Carso, which are about 600 species of cultivated plants.
- Natural Reserve of Monte Lanaro and suggestive osmize where you can buy and consume wine and typical products.

== Infrastructure and transport ==
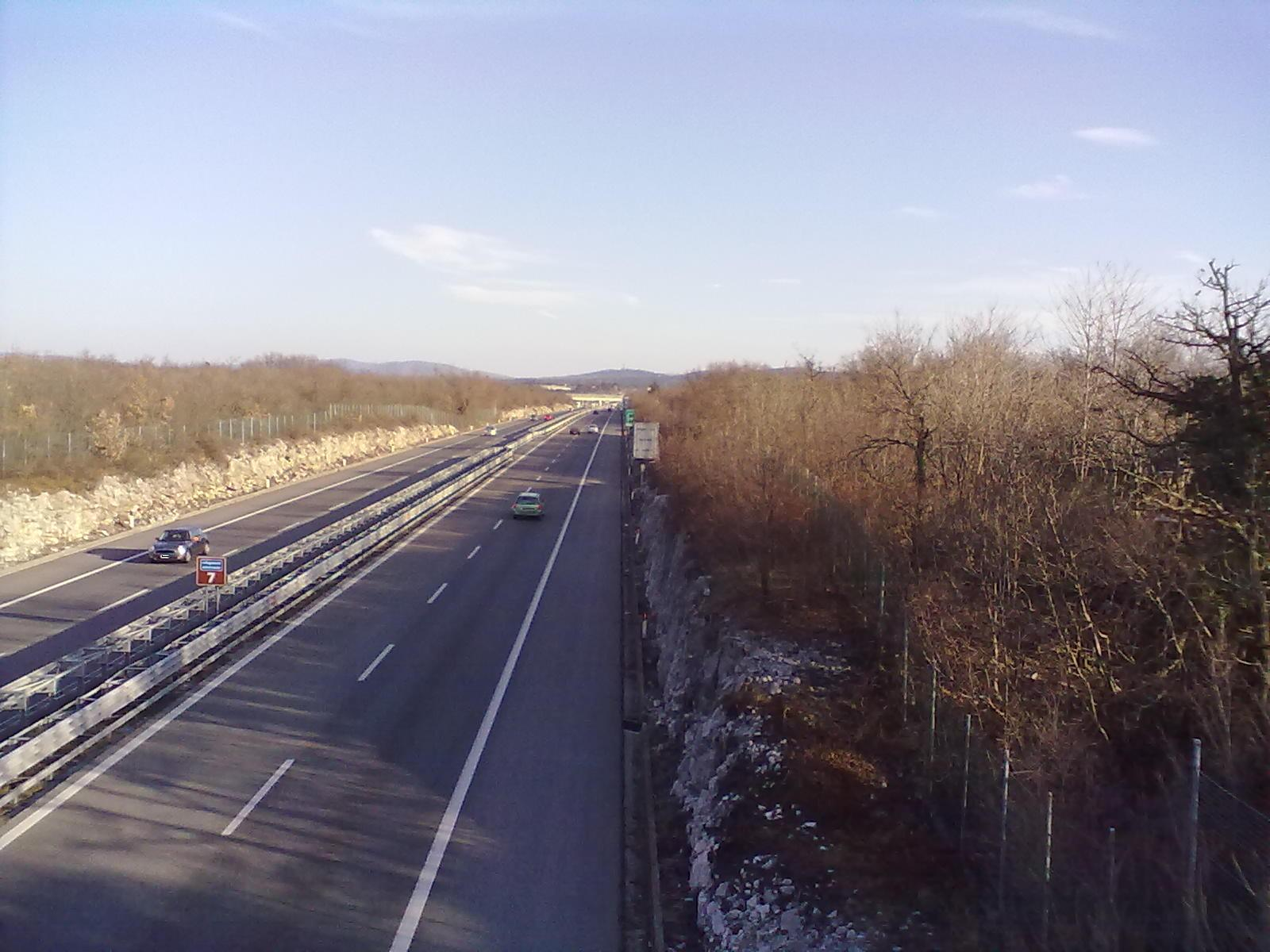
The stretch of the motorway 13 just before the Sgonico exit

The stretch of highway 13 just before the Sgonico exit, which connects Trieste to the A4 motorway, passes through the municipality. There is an exit near Gabrovizza. The municipality is well connected to the rest of the province by a dense network of secondary roads.

The Trieste Centrale-Villa Opicina railway line passes through the municipality, which once housed the Prosecco station, which was closed in 2012.

== See also ==
- Karst Plateau
- Gorizia and Gradisca
- Julian March
- Slovene Lands
