= Communist Party of the Free Territory of Trieste =

Communist Party of the Free Territory of Trieste Komunistična partija Svobodnega tržaškega ozemlja Partito Comunista del Territorio Libero di Trieste
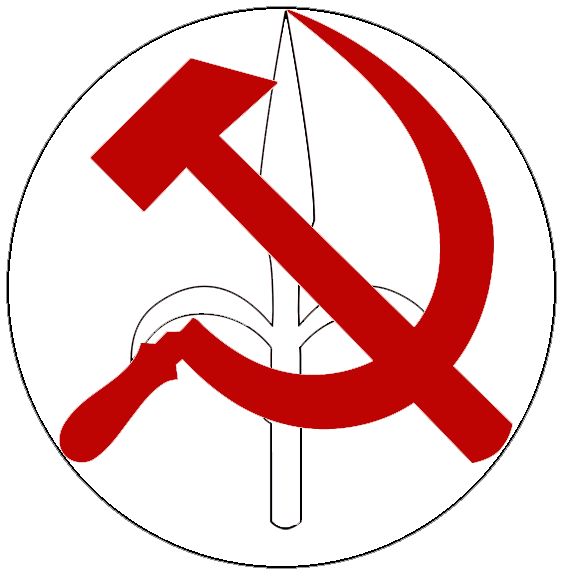
- Founded: 1947
- Dissolved: 1954
- Merger of: Local branch of Italian Communist Party and Communist Party of Slovenia
- Succeeded by: Italian-Slovenian Popular Front; Italian Communist Party
- Newspaper: Il Lavoratore
- Youth wing: Communist Youth Federation of the Free Territory of Trieste
- Ideology: Communism; Marxism–Leninism
- International affiliation: Cominform
- Colors: Red

The Communist Party of the Free Territory of Trieste (Italian: Partito Comunista del Territorio Libero di Trieste, PCTLT; Slovene: Komunistična partija Svobodnega tržaškega ozemlja, KPSTO) was a Marxist-Leninist party in the Free Territory of Trieste. It was founded at a congress in 1945 by a merger of the local branches of the Italian Communist Party and the Communist Party of Slovenia as the Communist Party of the Julian Region (Partito Comunista della Regione Giuliana, PCRG, Komunistična partija Julijske krajine, KPJK). The party published a daily newspaper, Il Lavoratore.

== History ==
Poster of the Second Congress of the Communist Party of the Free Territory of Trieste, 1949

=== Initial period ===
At the time of its foundation, the party favoured integration of the area with Yugoslavia. This stood in contrast with the line of the Italian Communist Party and its leader Palmiro Togliatti, which opposed Yugoslav claims to the region. The main leaders of the party were Rudi Uršič and the Yugoslav partisan leader Branko Babič.

In 1947, when the Free Territory was formally constituted, the party adopted the name PCTLT/KPSTO.

=== Tito-Cominform split ===
The party suffered a split following the 28 June 1948 resolution of Cominform, resulting in the expulsion of the Communist Party of Yugoslavia. The pro-Yugoslavia wing was led by Branko Babič, and the pro-Cominform wing was led by former Comintern cadre Vittorio Vidali. The pro-Cominform wing was able to retain a majority in the Central Committee (6 against 4), and Vidali became the leader of the party. Under Vidali's leadership the party began opposing the annexation of the Free Territory by Yugoslavia.

The pro-Yugoslav minority was largely composed of Slovenian cadres. The pro-Yugoslav minority then formed the Italian-Slovenian Popular Front (FPIS) under the leadership of Babič.

Although initially present in both the British-U.S.-controlled Zone A and the Yugoslavian-controlled Zone B, the PCTLT was suppressed in Zone B after the split. The FPIS took part in FTT elections in Zone A and continued to function after the integration of Zone A into Italy.

=== 1949 election ===
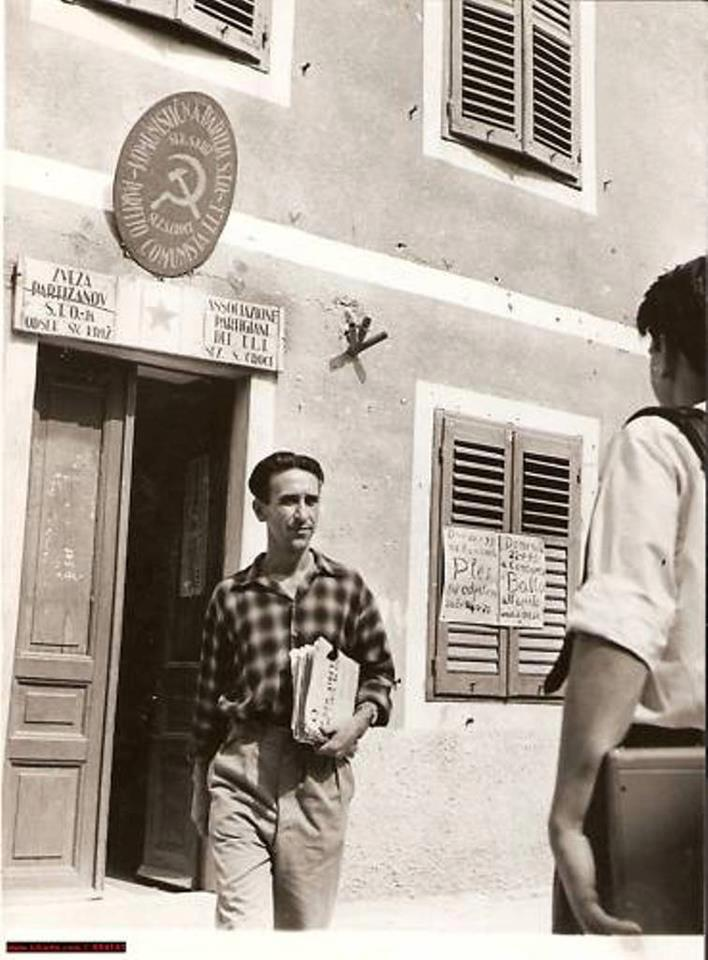
Communist Party F.T.T entrance, Santa Croce's branch.

The PCTLT took part in the 12 June 1949 elections in the Free Territory. It obtained 35,568 votes (approximately 20% of the total vote), and 13 seats. In the same election, FPIS obtained one seat. In the rigged so-called "popular" election of the Zone B in 1950, the FPIS was largely majoritarian instead.

=== Ethnic composition ===
PCTLT was the sole pluriethnical political force in the Free Territory at the time, with a large following amongst both Italian and Slovenian workers. It ran a separate Slovenian-language organ, Delo.

=== Youth wing ===
The youth wing of the party was known as the Communist Youth Federation of the Free Territory of Trieste (Federazione Giovanile Comunista del Territorio Libero di Trieste). FGCTLT published Gioventù. There was also an Anti-Fascist Youth Union of the Free Territory of Trieste, closely linked to the FGCTLT.

=== Integration into PCI ===
After the Zone A was integrated into Italy in 1954, the party merged into the Italian Communist Party (PCI) in 1957. Within the PCI, the Trieste communists had a Triestian Autonomous Federation.
