= Sežana =

- Town
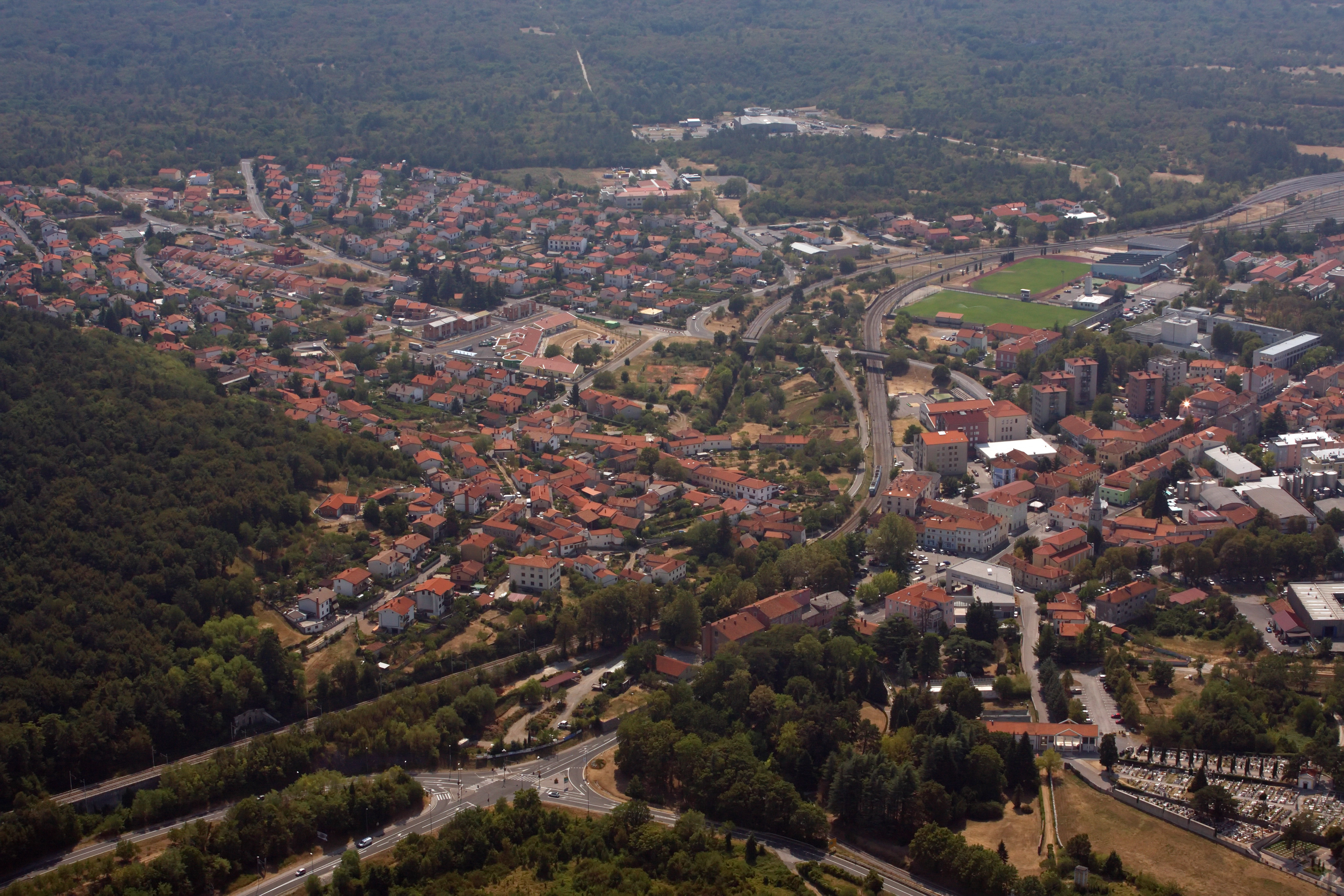
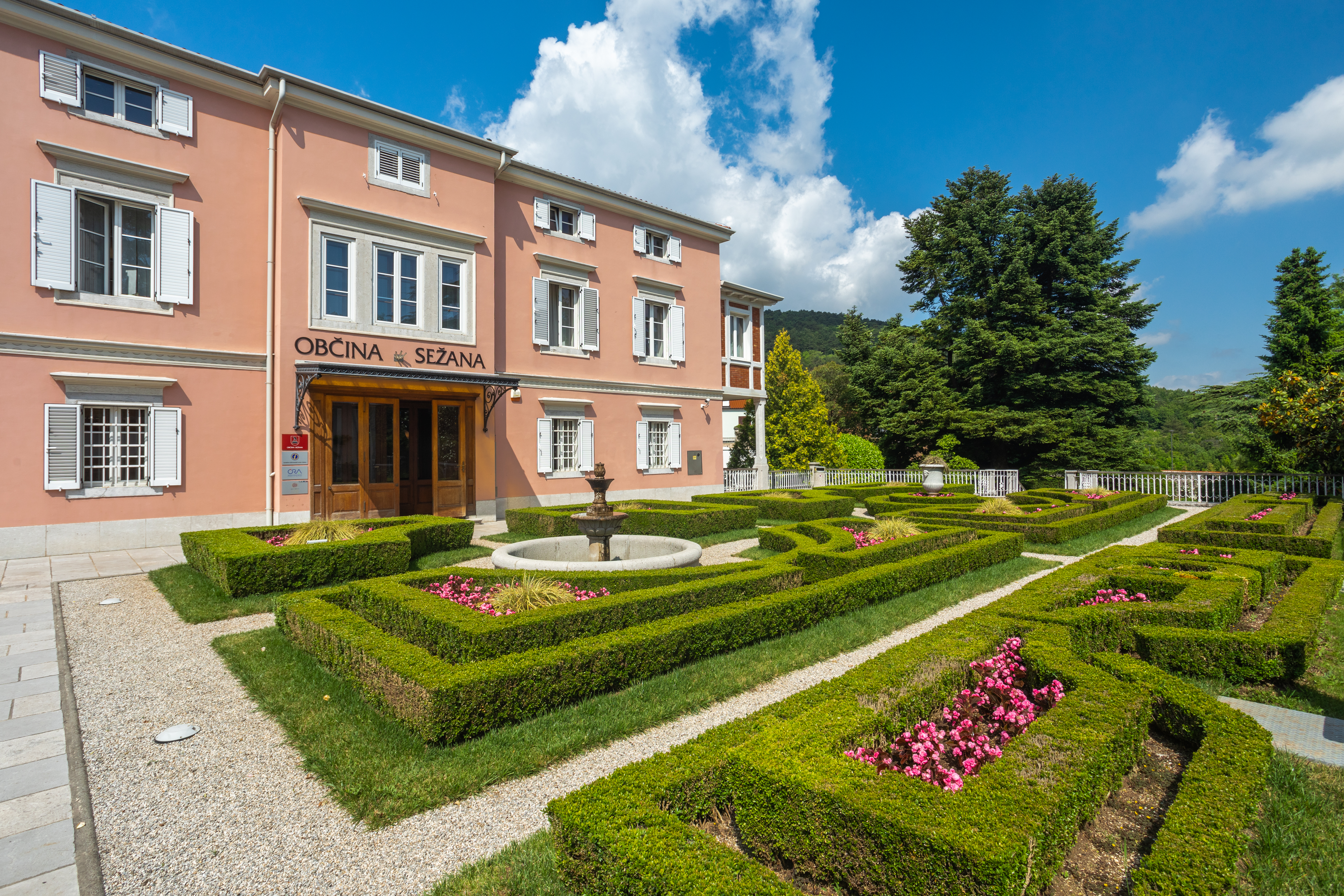
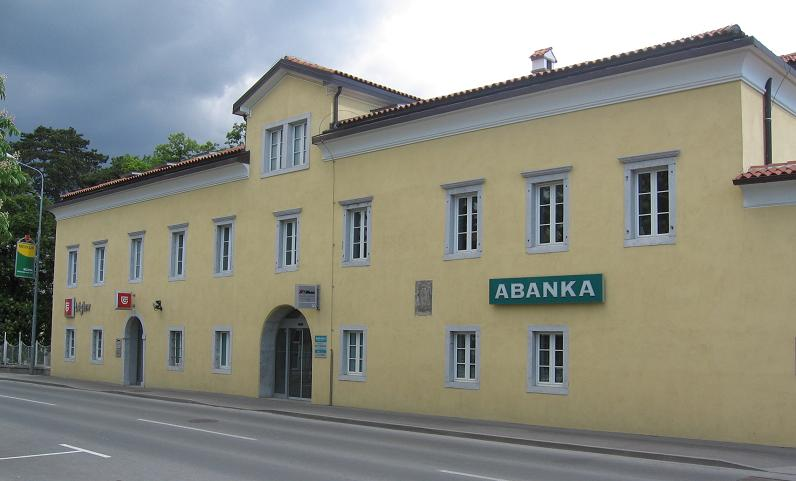
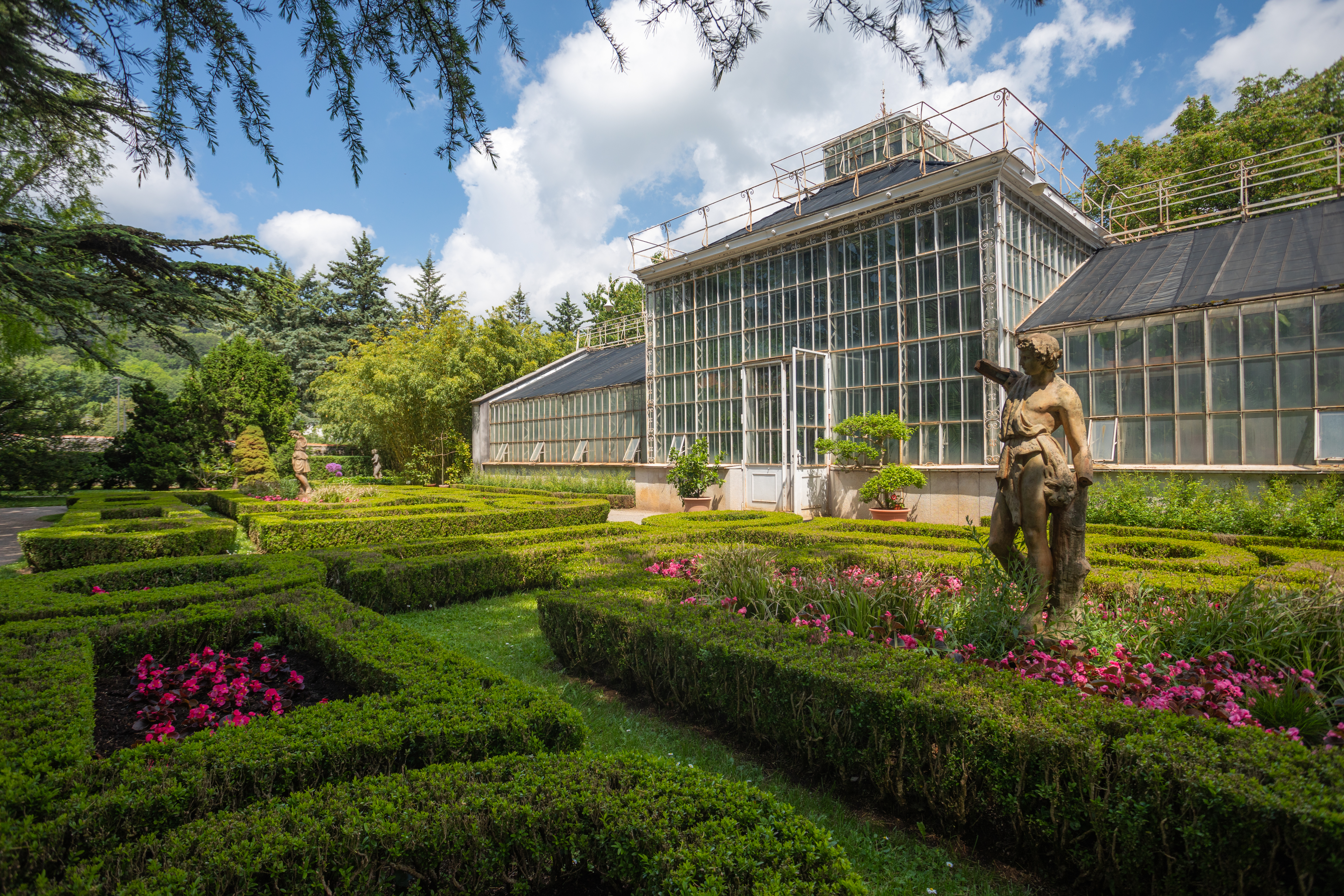
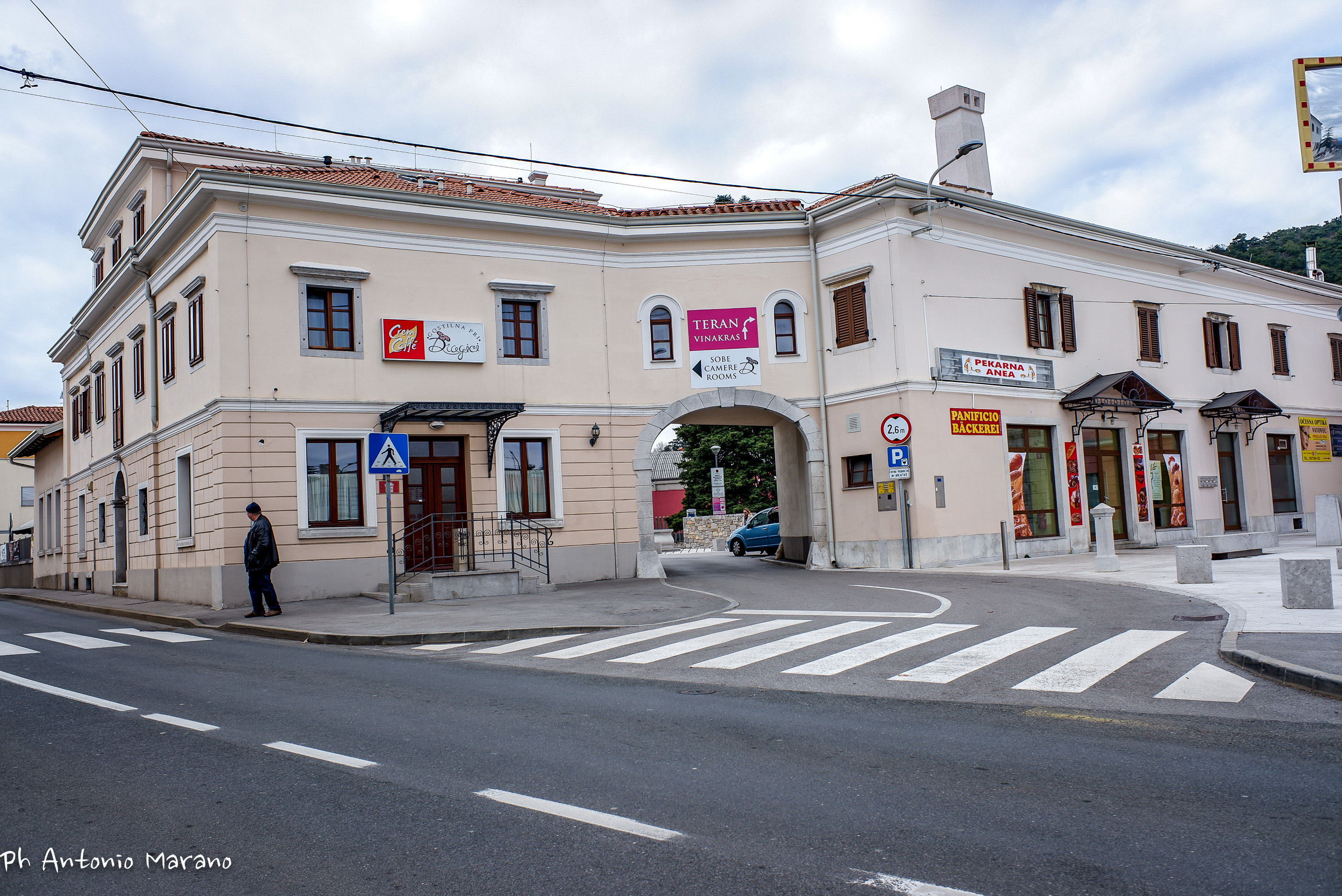
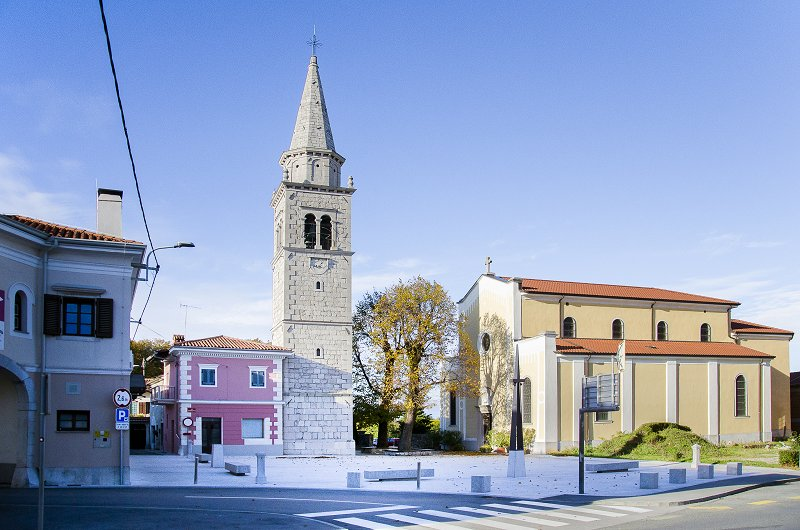
- From top, left to right: Overview of Sežana, Town Hall, Old Manor, Botanical garden greenhouse, Town center house, St. Martin's Church

- Flag Coat of arms

- Location in Slovenia
- Coordinates: 45°42′12.25″N 13°52′14.17″E
- Country: Slovenia
- Traditional region: Littoral
- Statistical region: Coastal–Karst
- Municipality: Sežana

Area
  - Total: 15.3 km^{2} (5.9 sq mi)
- Elevation: 360.5 m (1,183 ft)

Population (2020)
  - Total: 6,037
  - Density: 395/km^{2} (1,020/sq mi)
- Postal code: 6210, 6211
- Vehicle registration: KP
- Climate: Cfb

Sežana (pronounced [sɛˈʒáːna]; Italian: Sesana) is a town in the Slovenian Littoral region of Slovenia, near the border with Italy. It is the seat of the Municipality of Sežana. Sežana is located on the Karst Plateau, 17 kilometres (11 miles) from Trieste, Italy, and 80 km (50 mi) from Ljubljana, the capital city of Slovenia.

== Name ==
Sežana was attested in written sources in 1152 as in Cesan (and as Ses(s)ana in 1293 and Sexana in 1442). The name is of unclear origin. The early attestations do not support a connection with Saint Susanna or with the Friulian toponym Susáns. The presumed suffix -ana would indicate a Romance origin, making possible a derivation from the Latin personal name Sessius. Another possibility is derivation from the estate name *Sextiānum, and a Lombard origin of the name has also been suggested. In the 19th century the names Sessana and Sehsana were in official use.

== History ==
Until 1918, the town was part of the Austrian monarchy (on the Austrian side after the compromise of 1867) and the seat of the district of the same name, one of the 11 Bezirkshauptmannschaften in the Austrian Littoral province.

Sežana remained a small and rather insignificant village until the mid-19th century, when the Austrian Southern Railway Company built the Austrian Southern Railway, connecting Vienna to Trieste, next to it. Sežana thus became connected to major traffic and soon emerged as the most important center on the Karst Plateau, together with Opicina. After 1918, it was annexed to the Kingdom of Italy and included in the Province of Trieste. During the Fascist period, the population was subjected to a violent Italianization policy, and many locals joined the militant anti-fascist organization TIGR. During World War II, especially after 1943, the area became a battlefield between the Partisan resistance and the Fascist and Nazi German forces. In May 1945, Sežana was liberated by the Yugoslav Partisans. Between June 1945 and September 1947, it was administered by the British and U.S. Army. In 1947, it became part of the Federal People's Republic of Yugoslavia and, in 1991, of independent Slovenia.

Sežana railway station was opened in 1857, and forms part of the Vienna–Trieste railway. Since 1947, it has been that railway's border crossing point between Yugoslavia/Slovenia and Italy.

Historical population
Year	Pop.	±%
1948	1,244	—
1953	1,621	+30.3%
1961	2,295	+41.6%
1971	3,283	+43.1%
1981	5,188	+58.0%
1991	4,954	−4.5%
2002	4,876	−1.6%
2011	5,531	+13.4%
2021	6,172	+11.6%
Population size may be affected by changes in administrative divisions.

== Economy ==
Many industrial enterprises are located in Sežana, including larger companies as well as many smaller enterprises. Sežana is also a center for the tourism industry. Its location between Ljubljana, Trieste, and the Adriatic coast and many important tourist sights in the vicinity, such as the Lipica Stud Farm, Postojna Cave, Škocjan Caves, Vilenica Cave, and the fortified village of Štanjel, make Sežana an attractive tourist destination. Sežana is also an important agricultural center.

== Sights ==
- Botanical Garden
- Memorial Room commemorating the poet Srečko Kosovel
- walking trail from Sežana to Tomaj dedicated to Kosovel
- Karst Living museum
- Tabor nature trail

== Church ==
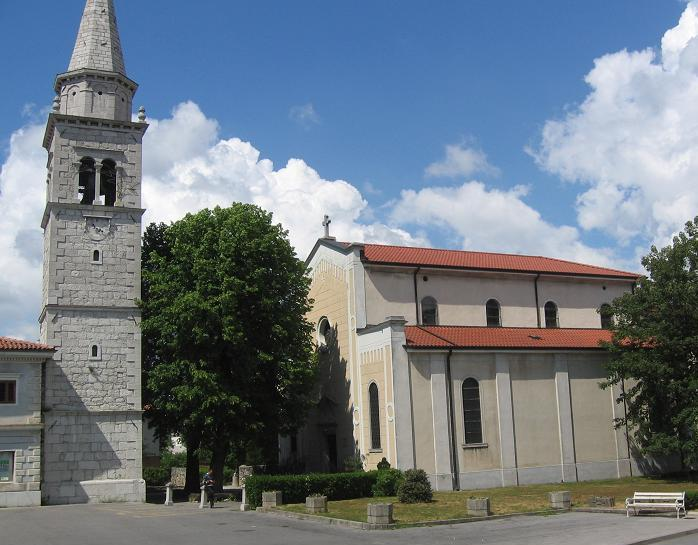
Saint Martin's Church

The parish church in the town is dedicated to Saint Martin and was built in 1878 on the site of an older church from the early 16th century, after it became an independent parish.

== Gallery ==
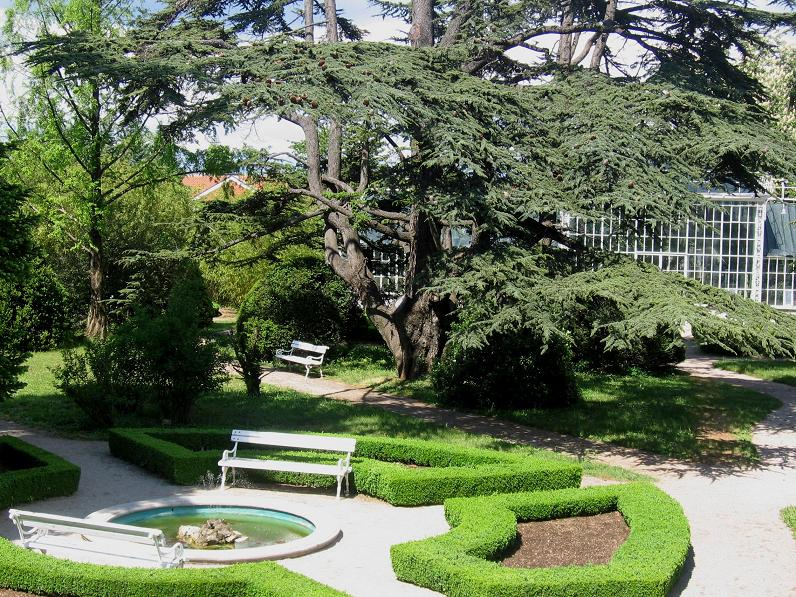
Botanical park in Sežana

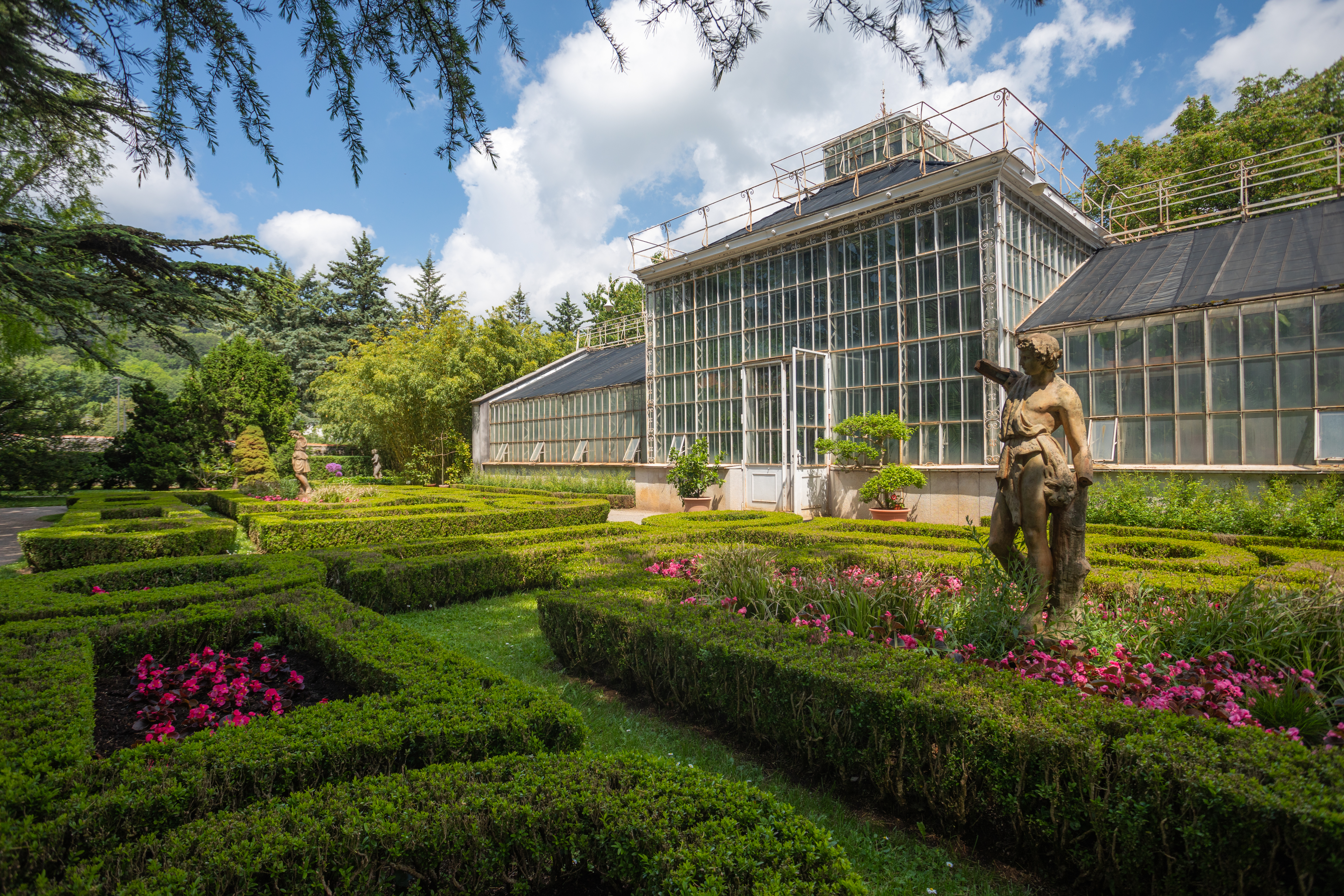
Greenhouse in the botanical garden

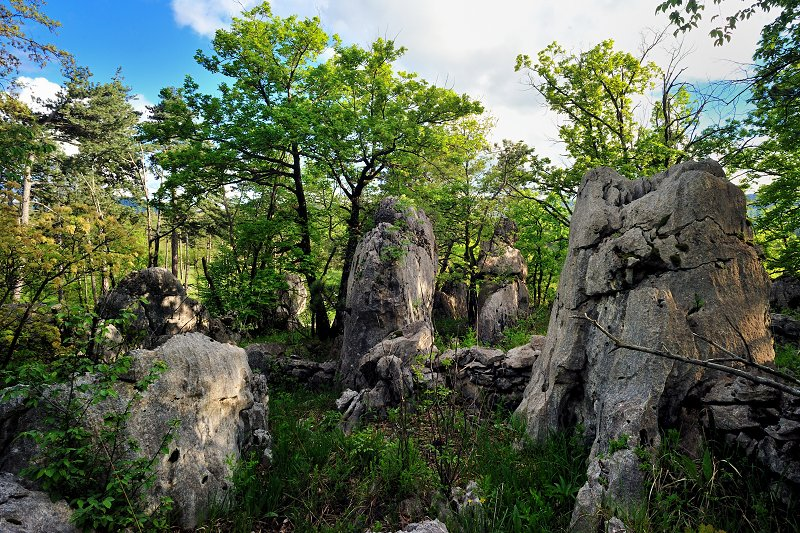
Karst Living Museum

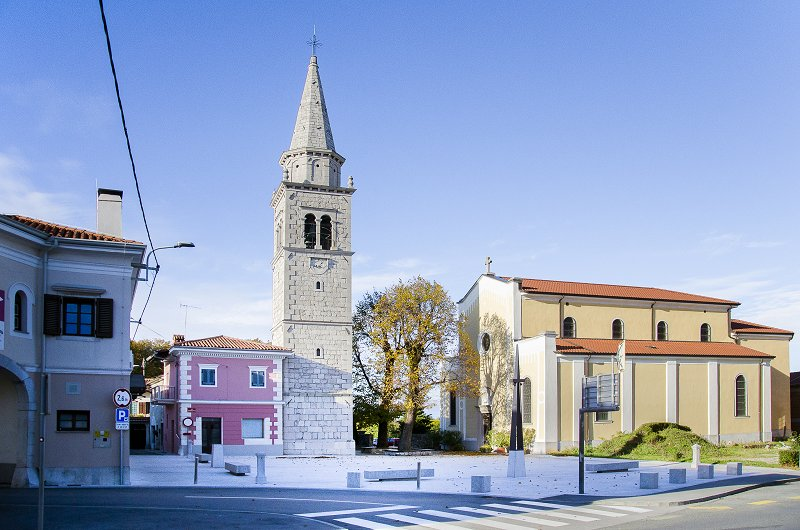
Saint Martin's Church

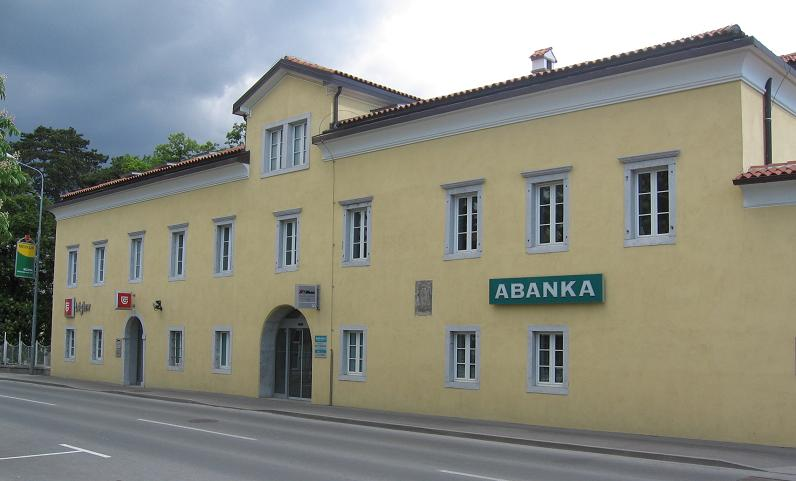
Old manor

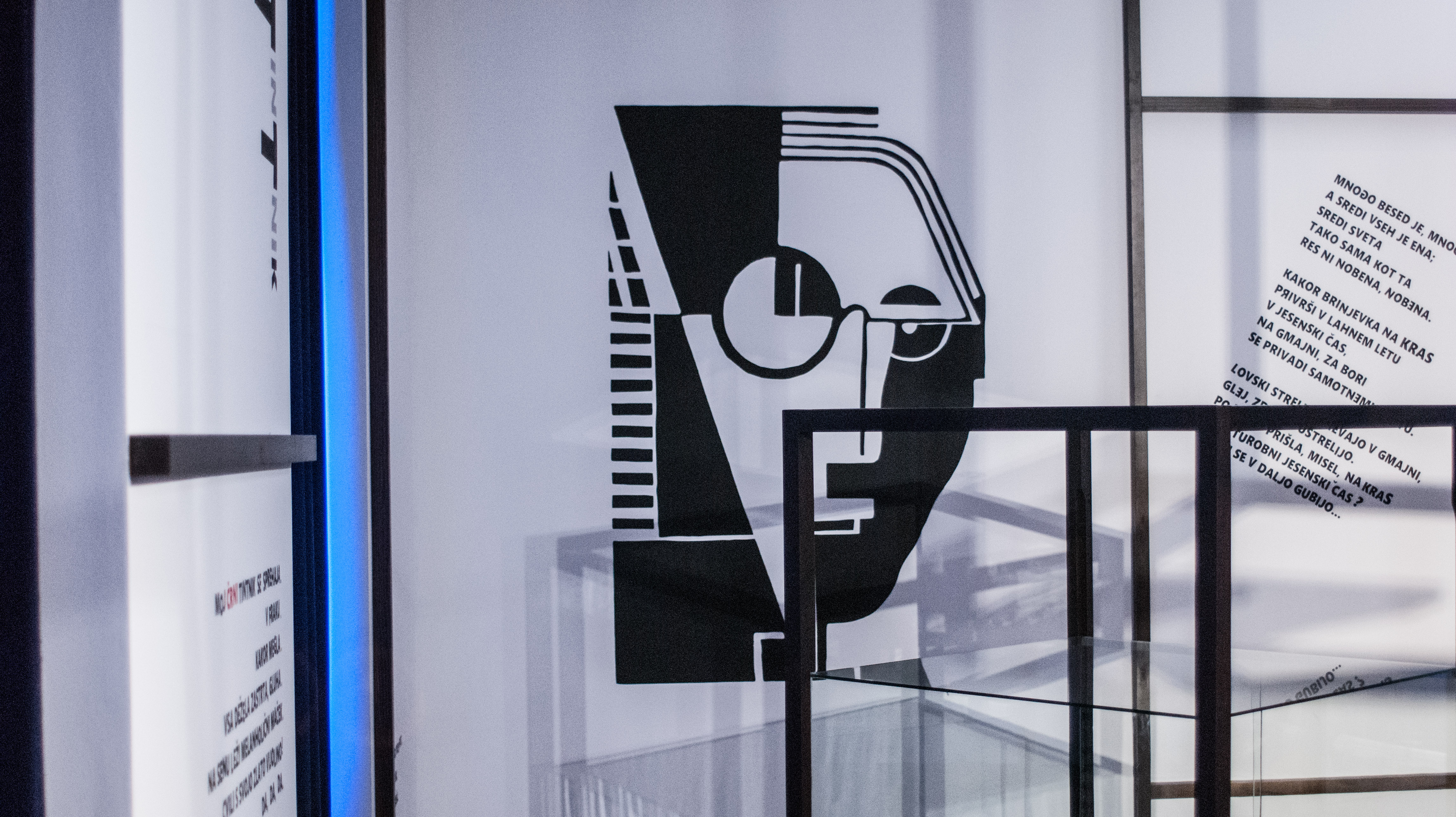
Srečko Kosovel memorial room

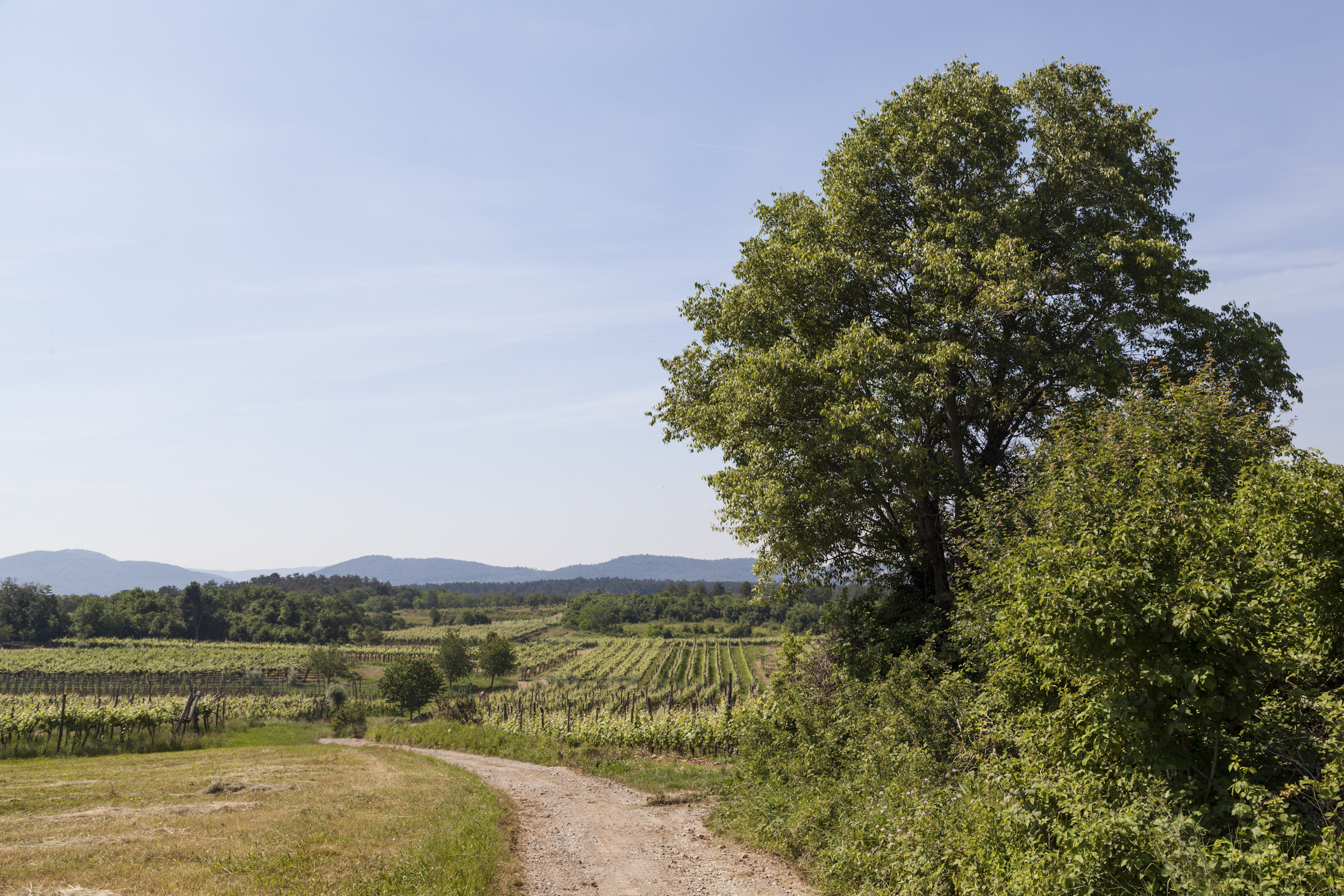
Kosovel walking trail

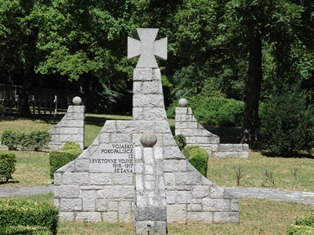
Military cemetery

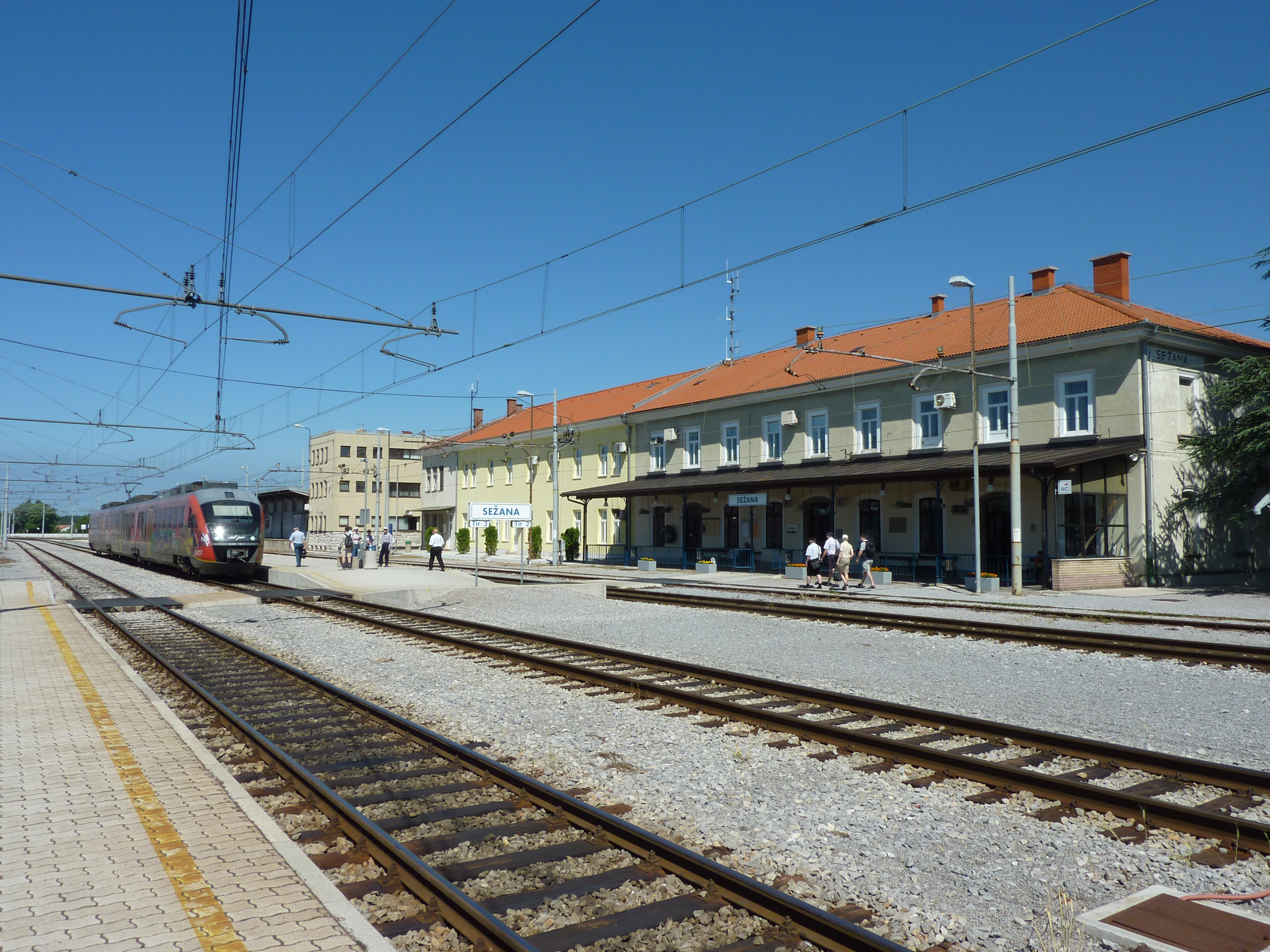
Sežana Train Station

== Twin cities ==
- Montbrison, France
- Rab, Croatia
- Gevgelija, North Macedonia
- Sant'Ambrogio di Valpolicella, Italy
- Sant'Ambrogio sul Garigliano, Italy
- Pardubice, Czech Republic
- Gornji Milanovac, Serbia
