= List of governors of the Province of Trieste =

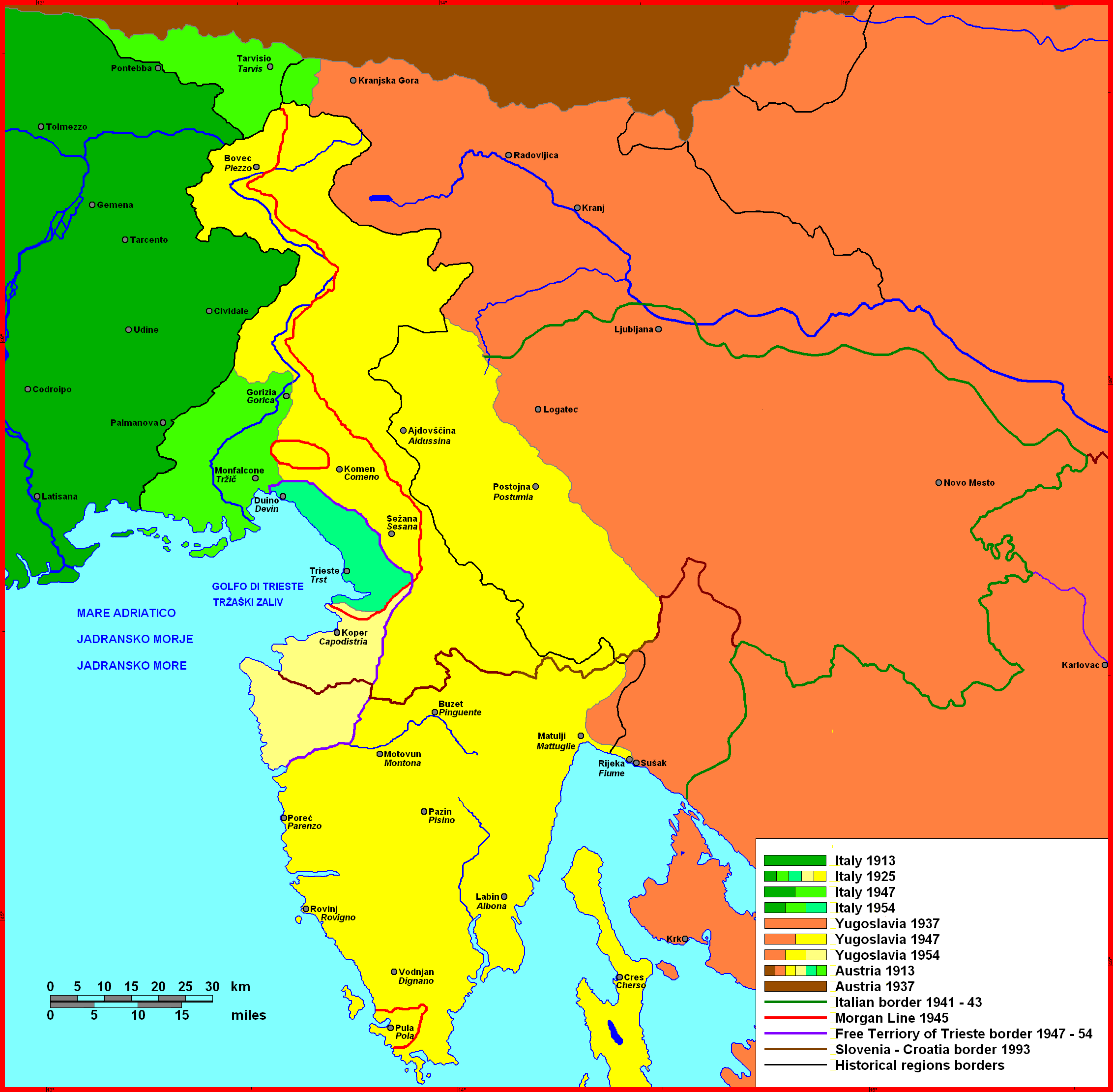
Changes of Italian eastern border from 1920 to 1975: The Austrian Littoral, later renamed Venezia Giulia (or Julian March), which was assigned to Italy in 1920 with the Treaty of Rapallo (the border was modified in 1924 with the Treaty of Rome and annexation of the Free State of Fiume) and which was later ceded to Yugoslavia in 1947 with the Treaty of Peace with Italy. Areas annexed to Italy in 1920, and remained Italian after 1947. Areas annexed to Italy in 1920, transferred to the Free Territory of Trieste in 1947 with the Treaty of Peace with Italy and definitively assigned to Italy in 1975 with the Treaty of Osimo. Areas annexed to Italy in 1920, transferred to the Free Territory of Trieste in 1947 with the Treaty of Peace with Italy and assigned definitively to Yugoslavia in 1975 with the Treaty of Osimo.

The following is a list of governors of the Province of Trieste, from 1918 to 1954. It includes Italian military governor, general civil commissioners and prefects, as well as Allied/Yugoslav military governors of the Free Territory of Trieste (Governors of all Julian March prior to the establishment of the Territory) in the aftermath of World War II.

== List ==
| Tenure | Incumbent | Notes | Portrait |
Italian suzerainty
| 3 November 1918 to 1919 | Carlo Petitti di Roreto, Military Governor | | |
| 31 July 1919 to 3 December 1919 | Augusto Ciuffelli, General Civil Commissioner | | |
| 8 December 1919 to 30 October 1922 | Antonio Mosconi, General Civil Commissioner | | |
| 1 November 1922 to 18 June 1924 | Francesco Crispo Moncada, Prefect | | |
| 22 June 1924 to 11 December 1925 | Amadeo Moroni, Prefect | | |
| 11 December 1925 to 15 December 1926 | Giovanni Gasti, Prefect | | |
| 16 December 1926 to 16 July 1929 | Bruno Fornaciari, Prefect | | |
| 16 July 1929 to 16 January 1933 | Ettore Porro, Prefect | | |
| 16 January 1933 to 1 August 1936 | Carlo Tiengo, Prefect | | |
| 1 August 1936 to 21 August 1939 | Eolo Rebua, Prefect | | |
| 21 August 1939 to 7 June 1941 | Dino Borri, Prefect | | |
| 7 June 1941 to 1 August 1943 | Tullio Tamburini, Prefect | 1st time | |
| 1 August 1943 to 11 September 1943 | Giuseppe Cocuzza, Prefect | | |
German occupation
| 12 September 1943 to 1 October 1943 | Tullio Tamburini, Prefect | 2nd time, appointed on behalf of the Italian Social Republic | |
| 22 October 1943 to 28 April 1945 | Bruno Coceani, Prefect | Appointed on behalf of the Italian Social Republic | |
| 28 April 1945 to 1945 | Antonio De Berti, Prefect | Appointed on behalf of the Italian Social Republic | |
Free Territory
Zone A (Allied)
| 2 May 1945 to July 1945 | Bernard Freyberg, Military Governor | From New Zealand | |
| July 1945 to July 1947 | Alfred Connor Bowman, Military Governor | From United States | |
| July 1947 to 15 September 1947 | James Jewett Carnes, Military Governor | From United States | |
| 15 September 1947 to 31 March 1951 | Sir Terence Airey, Military Governor | From United Kingdom | |
| 1 April 1951 to 26 October 1954 | Sir John Winterton, Military Governor | From United Kingdom | |
Zone B (Yugoslav)
| 1 May 1945 to September 1947 | Dušan Kveder, Military Governor | | |
| 15 September 1947 to March 1951 | Mirko Lenac, Military Governor | | |
| March 1951 to 25 October 1954 | Miloš Stamatović, Military Governor | | |
