= Free Territory of Trieste =

Former country in Europe between Italy and Yugoslavia

Coordinates: 45.68°N 13.75°E

Free Territory of Trieste Territorio Libero di Trieste (Italian) Svobodno tržaško ozemlje (Slovene) Slobodni Teritorij Trsta (Croatian) Слободна Територија Трста (Serbian) Teritorio Libero de Trieste (Triestine · Venetian)
- 1947–1954
- Flag Coat of arms

- Zone A (the green area and a small part of purple area) and Zone B (the pink and most of the purple area), indicating how the territory's control was split following its dissolution (green to Italy, pink to the Socialist Republic of Croatia, purple to the Socialist Republic of Slovenia)
- Status: Independent territory under direct responsibility of the United Nations Security Council
- Capital and largest city: Trieste
- Official languages: Italian · Slovene · Serbo-Croatian · English (only for administrative purposes)
- Religion: Catholicism, Serbian Orthodoxy, Judaism
- Demonym: Triestine
- Governor (Zone A)
  - 1945 (first): Bernard Freyberg
  - 1951–1954 (last): John Winterton
- Governor (Zone B)
  - 1945–1947 (first): Dušan Kveder
  - 1951–1954 (last): Miloš Stamatović
- Legislature: People's Assembly
- Historical era: Cold War
  - Trieste operation: 30 April 1945
  - UNSC Resolution 16: 10 January 1947
  - Treaty of Paris: 10 February 1947
  - Disestablished: 1954
  - London Memorandum: 5 October 1954
- Currency: Italian lira (Zone A); Triestine lira (Zone B)
Preceded by	Succeeded by
Italy	Yugoslavia; Italy
- Today part of: Croatia; Slovenia; Italy

The Free Territory of Trieste was an independent territory in Southern Europe between Italy and Yugoslavia (modern day Croatia and Slovenia), facing the north part of the Adriatic Sea, under direct responsibility of the United Nations Security Council in the aftermath of World War II. It existed for seven years.

The territory was established on 10 February 1947, by a protocol of the Treaty of Peace with Italy, to accommodate an ethnically and culturally mixed population in a neutral independent country. The intention was also to cool down territorial claims between Italy and Yugoslavia, due to its strategic importance for trade with Central Europe. It came into existence on 15 September 1947. Its administration was divided into two areas: one being the port city of Trieste with a narrow coastal strip to the northwest (Zone A); the other (Zone B) was formed by a small portion of the north-western part of the Istrian peninsula.

The territory was de facto dissolved in 1954 and given to Italy (Zone A) and Yugoslavia (Zone B). This created a border dispute which was only settled twenty years later with the signing of the bilateral Treaty of Osimo in 1975, which was ratified in 1977.

The city of Trieste and the territory of former Zone A are today part of Italy and its Friuli-Venezia Giulia region. Following the dissolution of Yugoslavia in the early 1990s, the area of former Zone B is today part of Slovenia and Croatia.

== Geography ==
Free Territory of Trieste identity card

The Free Territory of Trieste comprised an area of 738 square kilometres (285 sq mi) around the Gulf of Trieste in the northern Adriatic, from Duino (Devin) in the north to Cittanova (Novigrad) in the south, and had approximately 330,000 inhabitants.

It bordered post-war Italy to the north, and Yugoslavia to the east and south. The rivers of the territory included the Rižana/Risano, the Dragonja/Dragogna, the Timavo/Timava, the Val Rosandra/Glinščica, and the Mirna/Quieto. The Territory's highest point was at Monte Cocusso/Kokoš (668 metres (2,192 ft)). Its most extreme points were near Medeazza/Medjavas at 45° 48' in the north, at Tarski Zaliv / Porto Quieto at 45° 18' in the south, Savudrija / Punta Salvore at 13° 29' in the west, and Gročana/Grozzana at 13° 55' in the east.

== History ==
Unofficial coat of arms of the Free Territory of Trieste as used in Zone B from 1947 to 1954

Since 1382, Trieste had been part of the Habsburg monarchy, whereas neighboring Istria had been divided for centuries between the Habsburg monarchy (its central, northern and eastern parts) and the Republic of Venice (its western and southern parts). The population of the territory has been diverse and mixed, with different and often changing ethnic majorities in different parts of the territory.

Italian-speakers have been predominant in most urban settlements and along the coast, with significant ethnic South Slavic minorities of Slovenes and Croats inland – especially in the Trieste district, where Slovenes represented a third of the population by the end of World War I (although most of them were recent arrivals, after 1880, from interior Slovene districts). The countryside of the territory was mostly populated by ethnic Slovenes or Croats in the southernmost portion of the area. There were also smaller numbers of Istro-Romanians, Greeks, Albanians, as well as a sizeable Triestine Jewish community.

The local Triestine dialect reflects this ethnic mix. Based on the Romance Venetian language, the dialect was influenced by ancient Rhaeto-Romance substrate. In addition, some Triestine vocabulary are of German and Slovene origin, and there are also loanwords from other languages, such as Greek.

The variations of spoken Slovenian and Serbo-Croatian in the territory were also largely dialectal, sharing words with the Triestine and Istrian dialects. In the southernmost part of the territory, the Croatian-based dialects are of the Chakavian type, while the Venetian-based Istrian is also commonly used.

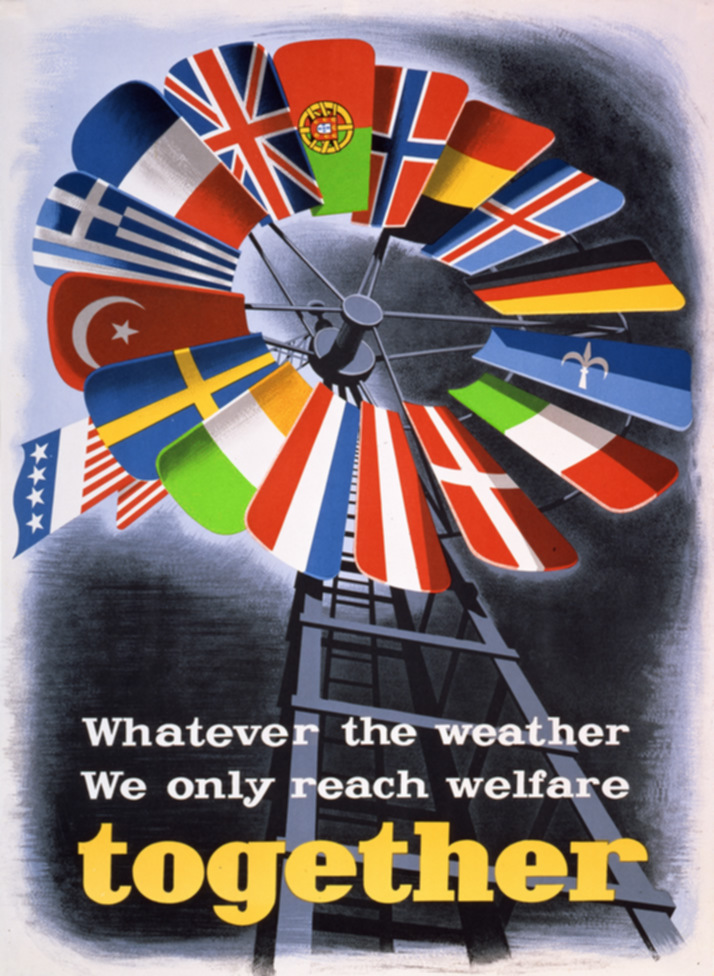
A 1950 poster for the Marshall Plan displaying national flags of European countries, including one for Trieste with a blue background (the United Nations' official colour)

At the end of World War I in 1918 and the dissolution of Austria-Hungary, the Kingdom of Italy annexed Trieste, Istria and part of modern-day western Slovenia, establishing the border region known as the Julian March (Italian: Venezia Giulia). In 1924, Italy also annexed the Free State of Fiume (now the city of Rijeka in Croatia).

During the 1920s and 1930s, the Slavic population was subject to forced Italianization and discrimination under the Italian Fascist regime led by Benito Mussolini. They were also exposed to state violence by mobs incited by the ruling fascist party PNF, which included the infamous burning of the Slovene National Hall in Trieste on 13 July 1920. Because of this, some native Slovenes and Croats emigrated to the Kingdom of Yugoslavia, while others joined the TIGR resistance organization, whose methods included more than 100 bombings and assassinations, mostly against Italian authorities in the region, and especially in the areas around Trieste and Gorizia to the north.

=== World War II ===
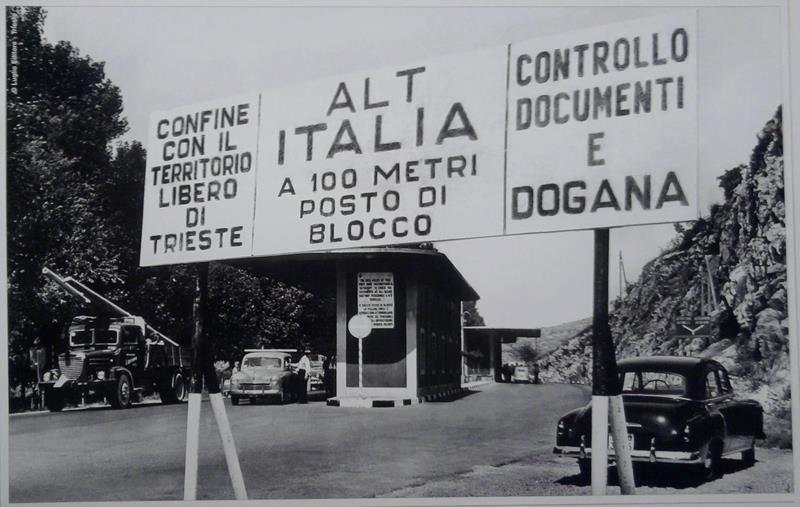
Border between the Free Territory of Trieste (Duino-Aurisina / Devin-Nabrežina) and Italy (Monfalcone)

Beginning in 1940, Italy joined World War II alongside Nazi Germany as one of the Axis powers. When the Fascist regime collapsed and Italy capitulated with the Armistice of Cassibile in September 1943, the territory in and around Trieste was occupied by the German Wehrmacht armed forces, which made the city the capital of their regional Operational Zone of the Adriatic Littoral (OZAK).

Amid the collapse of German front line towards the end of the war, Yugoslav Partisan units (4th Army and the 9th Corps) entered Trieste on 1 May 1945, after a battle in the town of Opicina on the outskirts of Trieste.

The 2nd New Zealand Division also arrived the following day, and forced the surrender of some 2,000 German troops holding out in Trieste, who warily had refused to capitulate to Yugoslav troops, fearing reprisals and executions. An uneasy truce then developed between New Zealand and Yugoslav troops occupying the area, until British General William Morgan proposed partition of the territory into separate military-administered zones.

Yugoslav leader Josip Broz Tito agreed with the idea on 23 May, as the British 13th Corps was moving forward to the proposed demarcation line. A formal agreement on partition was signed in Duino on 10 June, which created the so-called Morgan Line dividing the Julian March territory. Yugoslav troops withdrew to their area on 12 June 1945.

=== Establishment of the territory and provisional government ===
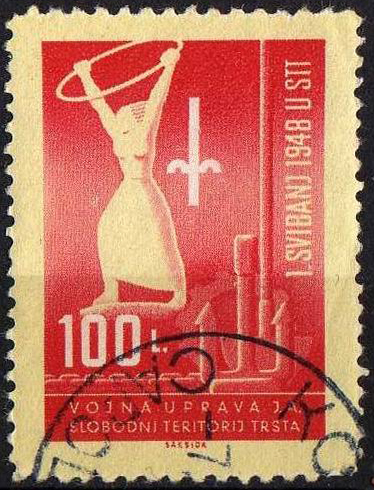
A postage stamp for Zone B of the Free Territory of Trieste, 1948

In January 1947, the United Nations Security Council approved Resolution 16 under Article 24 of its charter calling for the creation of a free state in Trieste and the region surrounding it. A permanent statute codifying its provisions was to become recognized under international law upon the appointment of an international governor approved by the Quatripartite Powers (the United Kingdom, the United States, France, and the Soviet Union). On 15 September 1947, the peace treaty between the United Nations (UN) and Italy was ratified, establishing the Free Territory of Trieste.

Official languages were Italian and Slovene, possibly with the use of Serbo-Croatian in the portion of Zone B south of the Dragonja River. However, local government bodies were never formed, and it continued to be run by military authorities, respecting the administrative division demarcated by the Morgan Line: Zone A, which was 222.5 square kilometres (85.9 sq mi) and had a population of 262,406 – including Trieste itself – was administered by the British and American forces; Zone B, – which was 515.5 square kilometres (199.0 sq mi) with 71,000 residents – including north-western Istria – was administered by the Yugoslav army.

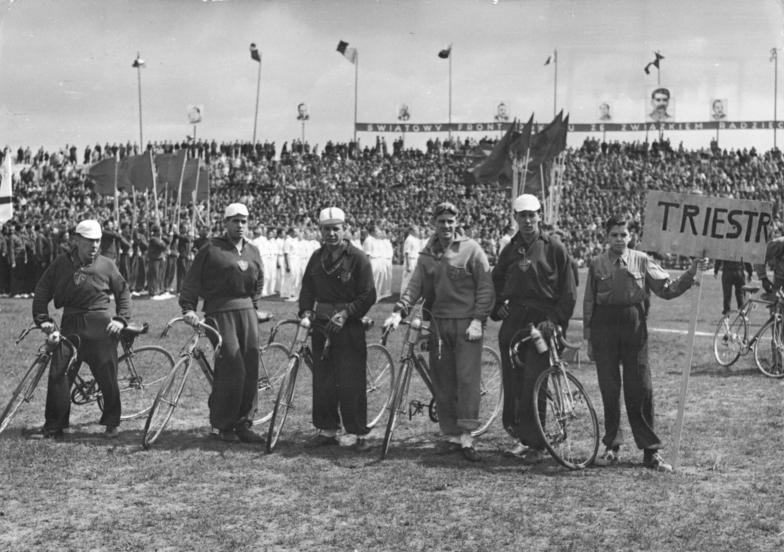
Cyclists from the Free Territory of Trieste during the 1950 Peace Race in Poland

Between October 1947 and March 1948, the Soviet Union rejected the candidacy of 12 successive nominees for the civilian governor of the territory, at which point the Tripartite Powers (United States, United Kingdom, and France) issued a note to the Soviet and Yugoslav governments on 20 March 1948 recommending that the territory be returned to Italian sovereignty.

Since no governor was ever appointed under the terms of UN Resolution 16, the Territory never functioned as a real independent state – although its formal status and separate sovereignty were generally respected. It operated as a separate state in the Marshall Plan (launched in April 1948) and the related OEEC (formed in March 1948). Meanwhile, the Tito–Stalin split in mid-1948 led to the deterioration of relations between Yugoslavia and the Soviet Union, which resulted in a political stalemate, and the proposal to return the territory to Italy was suspended until 1954. However, postage stamps were issued, with Italian issues overprinted for use in Zone A, and Yugoslav ones overprinted for Zone B. Later, issues specific to each area were produced.

The Allied Military Government (AMG) thus continued to administer Zone A. The governance was split into peacekeeping and law enforcement sectors, with the local command comprising 5,000 Americans in the Trieste United States Troops (TRUST) and 5,000 British personnel in the British Element Trieste Forces (BETFOR).

According to the estimates published by the Allied Military Government, the population in Zone A as of 1949 was about 310,000, which included 239,200 ethnic Italians and 63,000 ethnic Slovenes.

According to contemporary Italian sources, in Zone B, there were at the time 36,000 to 55,000 Italians and 12,000 to 17,000 Slovenes and Croats. According to the Yugoslav census of 1945 (which was described as "falsified" by US military intelligence), in the part of Istria which was to become Zone B there were a total of 67,461 inhabitants – including 30,789 Slovenes, Serbs and Croats, 29,672 Italians, and 7,000 people of unidentified nationality.

Elections in the Territory were held twice, in 1949 and 1952, but only for municipal councils. The elections for what was supposed to be the People's Assembly (Free Territory of Trieste's national legislature) were never held.

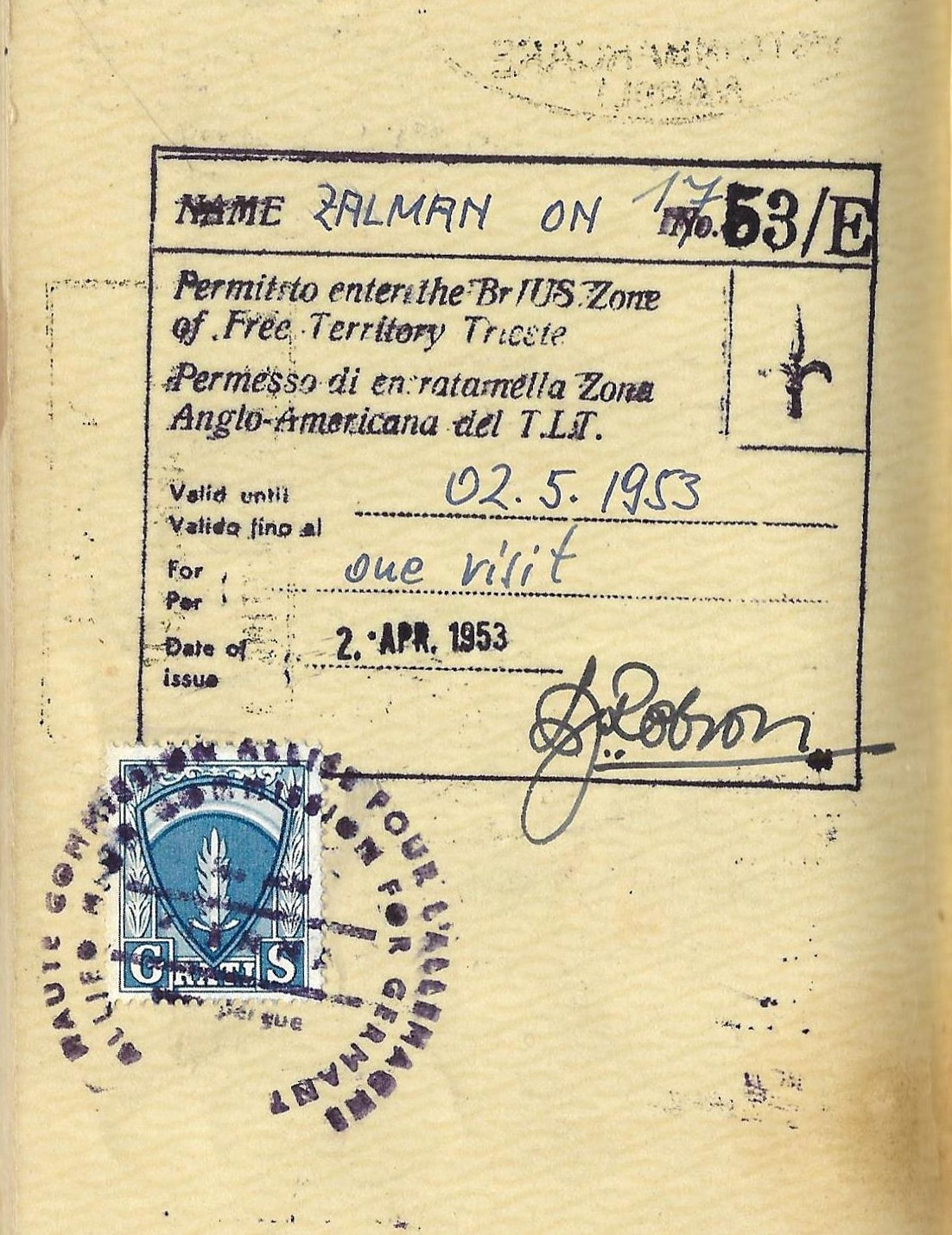
Free Territory of Trieste Diplomatic visa issued in Vienna

=== Suppression ===
For the entirety of its brief life, the Free Territory of Trieste was an object of dispute between Italy and Yugoslavia, both of which lay claim to its territory. This dispute almost led to military confrontation between the two countries in the early 1950s, and resulted in the Trieste riots in 1953.

On 5 October 1954, the dispute was resolved when the London Memorandum was signed by ministers of the United States, the United Kingdom, Italy, and Yugoslavia; the memorandum decreed the end of the Allied military administration of Zone A, which would be transferred to Italy, whereas Zone B would be annexed by Yugoslavia, along with the villages of Plavje, Spodnje Škofije, Elerji, Hrvatini, Kolomban, Cerej, Premančan, Barizoni, and Socerb (with its castle), previously part of Zone A.

After the withdrawal of the Allied troops from Trieste and Zone A by 24 October 1954, Italian troops took over on 25 October, and the following day, General Edmondo De Renzi declared full control over the area at 12:00, thus reuniting the city with Italy. The new borders were formalized twenty-one years later by the Treaty of Osimo, between Italy and Yugoslavia.

== Governors of the territory ==
=== Zone A ===
==== Military commander ====
Governor	In office	Country
Maj. Gen. Bernard Freyberg *	2 May 1945 – July 1945	New Zealand
Col. Alfred Connor Bowman *	July 1945 – July 1947	United States
Col. James Jewett Carnes *	July 1947 – 15 September 1947	United States
Maj. Gen. Sir Terence Airey	15 September 1947 – 31 March 1951	United Kingdom
Maj. Gen. Sir John Winterton	1 April 1951 – 24 October 1954	United Kingdom

=== Zone B ===
==== Military commander ====
Governor	In office	Country
Dušan Kveder *	1 May 1945 – September 1947	Yugoslavia
Mirko Lenac	15 September 1947 – March 1951	Yugoslavia
Miloš Stamatović	March 1951 – 25 October 1954	Yugoslavia

*Governors of all Julian March prior to the establishment of the Territory.

== Economics ==
The economy of the territory was based on its ports, namely the Free Port of Trieste and the Port of Koper/Capodistria. The first had a peculiar free zone (nowadays also offshore) status originated in 1719 and confirmed by the Treaty of Peace with Italy of 1947, which allows the transportation of goods inside the area. This status is recognised by the international community and the European Union.

An excerpt from the answer given by Algirdas Šemeta on 7 August 2012, on behalf of the European Commission about the Free Port of Trieste:

Annex VIII to the Treaty of peace with Italy of 10 February 1947 stipulates in its Article 1 that the port of Trieste shall be a customs-free port. Article 5(2) of Annex VIII provides that in connection with the importation into or exportation from or transit through the Free Port, the authorities of the Free Territory shall not levy on such goods customs duties or charges other than those levied for services rendered. [emphasis added]

== Demographics ==
During the late 1940s and in the years following the division of the territory, up to 40,000 people (mostly Italians) chose to leave the Yugoslav Zone B and move to the Italian Zone A for various reasons: some were intimidated into leaving, and some simply preferred not to live in Yugoslavia. Within Yugoslavia, the people who left were referred to as optanti (optants or 'choosers', per the right of option provided for other territories in the Treaty of Peace with Italy), whereas they called themselves esuli 'exiles'. About 14,000 Italians chose to remain in the Yugoslav zone. The population of the Free Territory of Trieste was approximately 370,000 in 1949.

== See also ==
- Treaty of Peace with Italy, 1947
- Communist Party of the Free Territory of Trieste
- United Nations Security Council Resolution 16
- Julian March
- Istrian–Dalmatian exodus
- Morgan Line
- Slovene Littoral
- Province of Trieste
  - List of governors of the Province of Trieste
- Triestine Serbs
- Slovenian Istria
- Istria County
- Trieste United States Troops
- Saar Protectorate
- Shanghai International Settlement
- Free City of Danzig
