= United Nations Security Council Resolution 16 =

United Nations Security Council resolution

UN Security Council Resolution 16
- Date: 10 January 1947
- Meeting no.: 91
- Code: S/RES/16 (Document)
- Subject: Approval of the Statute of the Free Territory of Triste
- Voting summary: 10 voted for; None voted against; 1 abstained
- Result: Adopted

Security Council composition
- Permanent members: China; France; Soviet Union; United Kingdom; United States
- Non-permanent members: Australia; Belgium; Brazil; Colombia; Poland; Syria

United Nations Security Council Resolution 16 was adopted on 10 January 1947. The Council approved three documents, officially recognizing the establishment of the Free Territory of Trieste.

Resolution 16 passed with ten votes to none. Australia abstained.

== Background ==
On 15 September 1947, the peace treaty between the United Nations and Italy was ratified, establishing the Free Territory of Trieste. Between October 1947 and March 1948, the Soviet Union rejected the candidacy of 12 successive nominees for the civilian governor of the territory, at which point the United States, United Kingdom, and France issued a note to the Soviet and Yugoslav governments on 20 March 1948 recommending that the territory be returned to Italian sovereignty.

Since no governor was ever appointed under the terms of Resolution 16, the Territory never functioned as an independent state

== See also ==
- Yugoslavia and the United Nations
