= Trieste United States Troops =

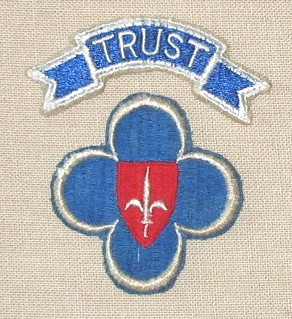
TRUST shoulder patch--Coat of arms of Trieste superimposed on the blue 88th Infantry division patch under a scroll with the letters TRUST

The Army command Trieste United States Troops (TRUST) was established 1 May 1947 in accord with a protocol to the Treaty of Peace with Italy which created the Free Territory of Trieste as a new independent, sovereign State under a provisional regime of Government and under the direct responsibility of the United Nations Security Council.

According to the protocol, when the Italian peace treaty came into force, the United Kingdom, the United States and Yugoslavia were each authorized to station 5,000 troops in the Free Territory of Trieste. British Element Trieste Force (BETFOR) was the UK organization in the free territory.

The United States Army assigned the mission of providing troops for the Free Territory of Trieste to the 88th Infantry Division which was on occupation duty in Italy along the Morgan Line between Italy and Yugoslavia. The 351st Infantry Regiment of the 88th Division was assigned as the major unit that would deploy to the free territory. Major General Bryant E. Moore, commander of the 88th Division, was assigned to command TRUST.

== Mission ==
The mission of TRUST was to maintain order in the Free Territory of Trieste and to support the policies of the Allied Military Government until such time as the Governor is appointed by the United Nations and sees fit to dismiss the force.

== Area of responsibility ==
The area which would become the Free Territory of Trieste had already been divided into two zones as a result of agreements shortly after the end of hostilities in Europe. The United Kingdom and the United States were administering Zone A, which included the city of Trieste, through a military government. Yugoslavia was administering Zone B, an area which included most of the Istrian peninsula. The borders between the two zones had been established by the Morgan Line.

After ratification, the Italian peace treaty provision for establishment of the Free Territory of Trieste was implemented 15 September 1947. The new boundary between Italy and Yugoslavia followed the already established Morgan line with minor modifications. Similarly, the Morgan line, with minor modifications, divided the Free Territory of Trieste. The United States and the United Kingdom continued to administer their Zone A through a military government.

As planned, the 351st Infantry Regiment and supporting units assumed TRUST responsibilities in Zone A of the Free Territory of Trieste. The 88th Infantry Division, having completed its occupation mission in Italy, was inactivated 24 October 1947.

United States and United Kingdom troops manned a series of 16 border outposts. TRUST soldiers manned Outposts 1 through 6. BETFOR troops manned Outposts 7 through 16. The local police force, Venezia Giulia Police Force (VG police), assisted the British and American troops in manning the outposts. The VG police carried out the routine law enforcement responsibilities in Zone A.

== Organization ==
TRUST headquarters was established at Miramare castle. An Army Troop Information and Education bulletin described the headquarters, “Headquarters is probably the ritziest in the US Army. It is located in Miramare Castle, that ‘gleaming pearl in an emerald setting’ on the outskirts of Trieste built by Maximilian, younger brother of Emperor Franz Joseph of Austria. The castle is filled with oil paintings, hand-carved woodwork of intricate design, embossed wood carvings and other signs of the lavishness of the old Austrian court. Even hard-bitten ‘old soldiers’ who enter Miramare are found staring open-mouthed at the splendor of the castle, like a small child on his first visit to the zoo.”

The headquarters of the 351st Infantry Regiment was in Opicina. Two of its infantry battalions were stationed in the Opicina area on the plateau above Trieste. One infantry battalion was stationed in Trieste. Non-regimental units were stationed at a number of locations in the free territory including the city of Trieste, the Opicina area and Duino.

In an article in March 1948, the Saturday Evening Post described TRUST as it was six months after assuming its mission in the Free Territory of Trieste. “Its hard core consists of the crack 351st Infantry Regiment, most of whose officers and men belonged to the recently deactivated famous 88th Division and carry on the tradition of that famous fighting unit. For its fancy work, TRUST has a tank company, a cannon company and an air observation unit made up of a half dozen tiny L-5s operating from a makeshift metal strip which is the only airport in the territory. There is no air cover but the American airbases in Germany and Austria are only an hour’s run away. There’s no heavy artillery, but some fighting ships of the British and American navies are always in the Trieste harbor and their long-range guns can command the roads into the city.”

During its seven-year existence, some units in TRUST were inactivated, some were redesignated and others were added to the command. In 1952 the major combat unit in TRUST was the 351st Infantry Regiment which included:

- Headquarters and Headquarters company
- Tank company(originally the separate 15th Tank company)
- Heavy Mortar company
- Service company
- three infantry battalions, each with a headquarters company, three rifle companies and one heavy weapons company.

One of the colonels who commanded the 351st Infantry Regiment, Colonel Earle Wheeler, had a distinguished military career. General Wheeler was chairman of the Joint Chiefs of Staff from 1964 to 1970 during the Vietnam war.

Non-regimental support units included:

- 88th Reconnaissance Company
- 12th Field Artillery Battery (arrived in 1953)
- 517th Combat Engineer Company (initially 60th Combat Engineer company, later redesignated 7107 Engineer company, finally designated 517th)
- 281st Military Police Service Company
- 7106th Engineer Service Company
- 23rd Ordnance Maintenance Company
- 508th Signal Company
- 23rd Quartermaster Company
- 9th Transportation Truck Company (inactivated in 1953, merged with the 23rd Quartermaster Company)
- 7th Station Hospital
- 537th Medical Service Company
- 98th Army Band
- 17th Counterintelligence Corps Detachment
- 7101st General Depot Headquarters Company (inactivated in 1953).
- 7100 Headquarters, Allied Military Government Detachment

From its outset, TRUST gained a reputation as a spit and polish command. It started with the first commander, Major General Bryant E. Moore, who was quoted in his obituary as having whipped a sloppy occupation force into a spit and polish outfit. Uniforms were altered for better appearance. Troops wore blue scarves and lacquered helmet liners with decals of the TRUST patch. Web pistol belts were dyed black and brass fittings shined. Some bayonets and mess kits were chrome plated.

TRUST was a segregated command through most of its seven years, and was the last major Army command to be integrated. After extended discussions, the Army followed Defense Department guidance and authorized assignment of black soldiers to TRUST in April 1953.

== Mission ends ==
In October 1953, the Governments of the United States and Great Britain announced plans to withdraw their forces from the Free Territory of Trieste and turn administration of Zone A over to the Italian Government, but did not announce a date to implement that plan. Late in 1953 when it became apparent that the four powers, United Kingdom, United States, Italy and Yugoslavia, were likely to reach an agreement on the civil administration of the Free Territory of Trieste, the United States Army evacuated dependent families.

United States troops began leaving the Free Territory of Trieste in early October 1954 after the Governments of the United States, of the United Kingdom, of Italy and of Yugoslavia signed on 5 October 1954, the Memorandum of Understanding of London to hand over the role of provisional government of the Free Territory: the Italian Government being entrusted with the administration of "Zone A" and the Yugoslav Government receiving the same role over "Zone B". Advance parties moved by military convoy and rail to Livorno. An Italian general met with the TRUST commander at Duino castle to commence planning for the new Italian provisional administration of the main Zone of the FTT.

Acknowledging the end of the mission, Miloš Stamatović, administrator of "Zone B", gifts a book of "Zone B" postage stamps to Major General John A. Dabney on 21 October 1954, prefaced with the letter from Miloš Stamatović to John A. Dabney.

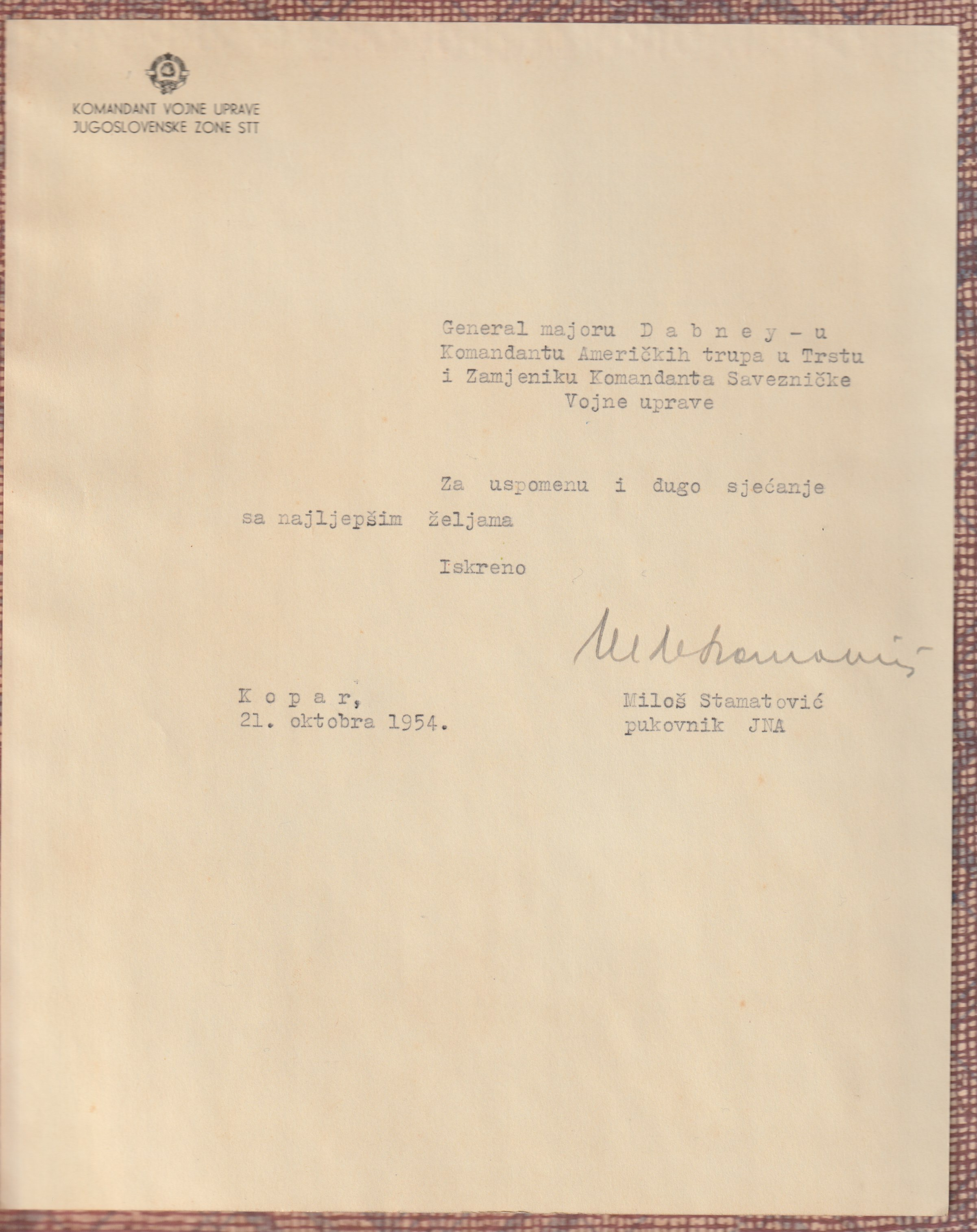
Parting gift from Miloš Stamatović to John A. Dabney

The last British and American troops boarded ships 26 October 1954 as Italian troops arrived in a heavy rain storm. The last TRUST commander, Major General John A. Dabney, drove to the airport at Udine, then flew to Livorno to join troops that had already assembled there.

== Commanders ==
- Major General Bryant E. Moore, May 1947 to June 1948
- Major General William M. Hoge, June 1948 to March 1951
- Major General Edmund Sebree, March 1951 to July 1952
- Major General William B. Bradford, July 1952 to February 1953
- Major General Bernice M. McFayden, February 1953 to July 1954
- Major General John A. Dabney, July 1954 to September 1954

== Notes ==
Treaty of Peace with Italy, in force, United Nations Treaty Series
Memorandum of Understanding of London, in the United Nations Treaty Series
