= John A. Dabney =

American general

- Born: November 4, 1903; Hopkinsville, Kentucky
- Died: August 26, 1991 (aged 87); Asheville, North Carolina
- Military career
- Allegiance: United States
- Branch: United States Army
- Rank: Lieutenant General
- Service number: O-16602
- Unit: Eighth Army
- Conflicts: World War II; Korean War

Col. John A. Dabney G-3 8th Army was born in Hopkinsville, Kentucky on November 4, 1903. Died, August 26, 1991. General, U.S. Army. University of Kentucky, B.A., cum laude, University of Kentucky Army ROTC 1926.

At the University from which he graduated cum laude in 1926, he was a member of Alpha Tau Omega, Phi Beta Kappa, Omicron Delta Kappa, Keys, Mystic 13, Lamp and Cross, and Scabbard and Blade. Based upon his ROTC service, he was commissioned a Second Lieutenant, Infantry, in the Regular Army of the United States, and he served continuously until his retirement October 1, 1960. Designated an honor graduate of the University's ROTC program, he was commissioned in the Regular Army as a Second Lieutenant of Infantry. He served in North Africa and the European Theatre during World War II.

In 1951, he was awarded the Distinguished Service Medal for his part in planning the conduct of the offense against the North Koreans and the Chinese Communists. In 1960, he was named assistant Secretary of Defense (International Security Affairs) for Disarmament and Military Affairs.

== Career ==
During the war, he served as a staff officer, II Corps, in England and North Africa. During the Korean War, he was staff officer with the Eighth U. S. Army in Korea. His overseas service included the Philippines, 1929–31; Puerto Rico, 1934–36; Japan, 1948–50; Germany Trieste and France, 1954–57. Service in the nation's capitol included one tour with the CIA and two tours with the Department of Defense. His decorations included the Distinguished Service Medal, with oak leaf cluster.

MG Dabney served as military advisor to the Assistant Secretary of Defense.

The last British and American troops boarded ships 26 October 1954 as Italian troops arrived in a heavy rain storm. The last TRUST commander, Major General John A. Dabney, drove to the airport at Udine, then flew to Livorno to join troops that had already assembled there.

His Army promotions were: First Lieutenant, 1932; Captain, 1936; Major, 1940; Lieutenant Colonel, 1942; Colonel, 1942; Brigadier General, 1951; Major General, 1953; and Lieutenant General, 1959. He was a graduate of the Infantry School in 1932, the Command and General Staff School, 1940, and the National War College, 1948. He was an instructor at the U. S. Military Academy, 1937–39. John Albert Dabney was named to the Hall of Distinguished Alumni in February, 1965.

== See also ==
- Trieste United States Troops
