= Bruno Fornaciari =

Italian politician

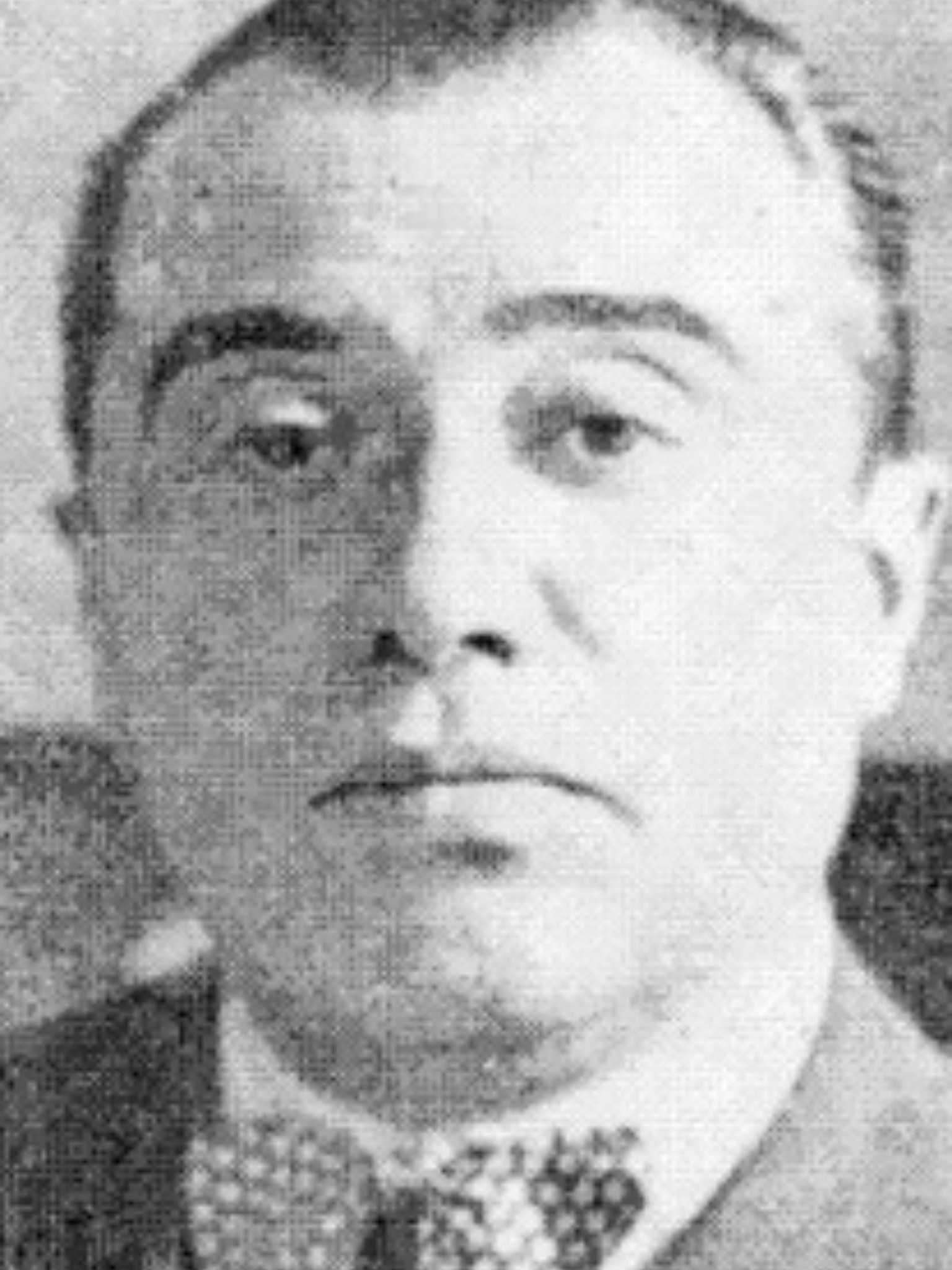

Minister of the Interior of the Kingdom of Italy
- In office 26 July 1943 – 9 August 1943
- Preceded by: Benito Mussolini
- Succeeded by: Umberto Ricci
- Prefect of Milan
- In office 1 August 1930 – 25 July 1935
- Preceded by: Giuseppe Siragusa
- Succeeded by: Riccardo Motta

Prefect of Trieste
- In office 16 December 1926 – 16 July 1929
- Preceded by: Giovanni Gasti
- Succeeded by: Ettore Porro

Personal details
- Born: 17 October 1881 Sondrio, Kingdom of Italy
- Died: 19 June 1959 (aged 77) Rome, Italy
- Party: National Fascist Party

Bruno Fornaciari (Sondrio, 17 October 1881 – Rome, 19 June 1959) was an Italian civil servant, who served as prefect of Trieste and Milan under the Fascist regime and briefly as Minister of the Interior of the Badoglio I Cabinet, the first after the fall of the regime.

== Biography ==
He was born in Sondrio in 1881, and after obtaining a degree in law in 1903, he started his career at the Ministry of the Interior, holding offices in Pavia and Genoa. From 1909 he worked for the public health directorate, participating in the relief of the Calabria and Sicily earthquake of 1908, of the cholera epidemic of 1910-11 and of the 1915 Avezzano earthquake, being later awarded the Silver Medal for Public Health Merit.

In 1923, he was appointed Vice Prefect of Florence, and in May 1926, he joined the National Fascist Party, although he was considered a follower of Nitti rather than a true Fascist. On 6 December 1926, after two months as prefectural commissioner for the municipality of Genoa, he was appointed prefect of Trieste until July 1929, when he became director-general of public health services until March 1930. He was then prefect of Milan from 1930 to 1935, after which he was placed at the head of the general direction of the civil administration at the Ministry of the Interior.

After being placed on leave, he worked in the Italian Red Cross and in the organisation for the assistance of disabled veterans. Following the fall of the Fascist regime on 25 July 1943, he was appointed Minister of the Interior of the Badoglio I Cabinet, overseeing the suppression of the National Fascist Party and the dissolution of the Grand Council of Fascism, the Chamber of Fasces and Corporations and the Special Tribunal for the Defense of the State, as well as the extension of the state of war and martial law to the entire Italian territory. On 9 August 1943 he was replaced by Umberto Ricci. In 1948, he was nominated to the Council of State and later a judge at the Supreme Military Tribunal until 1951, when he retired. He died in 1959.
