= Dušan Kveder =

Yugoslav military officer and communist politician

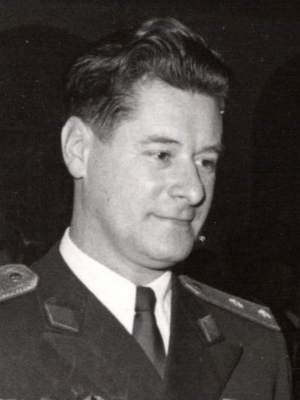

Yugoslav Military Governor of the Julian March
- In office 1 May 1945 – September 1947
- Succeeded by: Mirko Lenac

Personal details
- Born: 9 April 1915 Sveti Jurij pri Celju, Austro-Hungarian Empire
- Died: 12 March 1966 (aged 50) Belgrade, SR Serbia, SFR Yugoslavia

Military service
- Allegiance: Spanish Republic; Yugoslavia
- Branch/service: International Brigades; Yugoslav People's Army
- Years of service: 1937–1939, 1941–1955
- Rank: Lieutenant General
- Battles/wars: Spanish Civil War; World War II

Dušan Kveder (9 April 1915 – 12 March 1966) was a Yugoslav soldier and diplomat from Slovenia who served in a number of official capacities during and after the Second World War, including a term as Military Commander of the Free Territory of Trieste and as the Yugoslav ambassador to Ethiopia, West Germany, India, and the United Kingdom. He was made a People's Hero of Yugoslavia in 1952.

== Biography ==
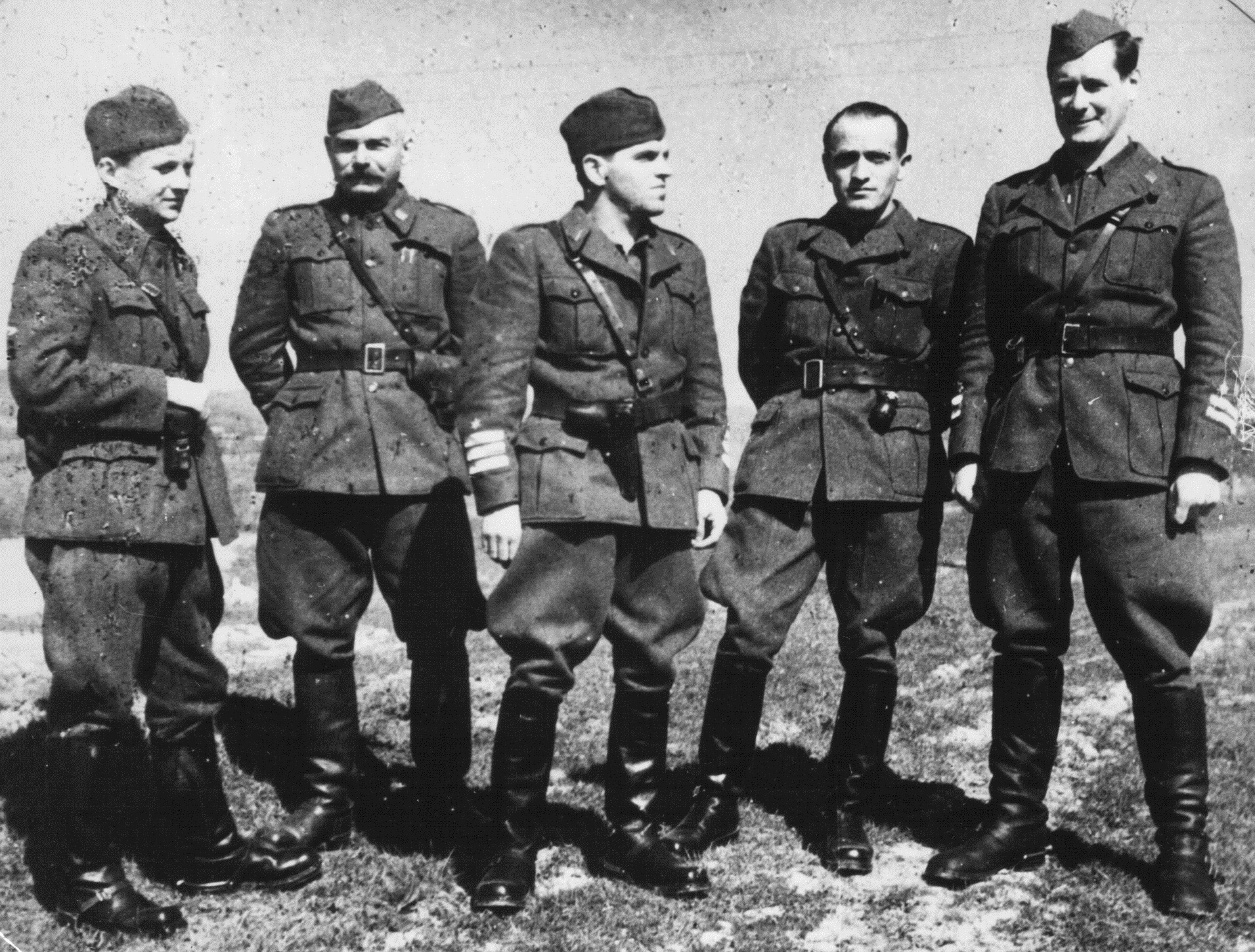
Kveder (furthest to the right) with the main staff of the National Liberation Army in 1944

=== Early life and activism ===
Kveder was born in Sveti Jurij pri Celju in the Austro-Hungarian Empire (today Šentjur, Slovenia) in 1915. While enrolled at university in Zagreb in 1933, he joined the then-underground Communist Party of Yugoslavia and was subsequently arrested and served six months in prison for his pro-communist writings in the city of Ptuj. Upon his release, he briefly went to Ljubljana to study law but returned to Ptuj due to an illness and began working full time as an organizer for the communist party. In 1935 he became editor of the communist magazine Mlada pota until it was banned the following year. He then moved to Paris, France to escape a warrant issued for his arrest.

In France, Kveder began gathering volunteers for the International Brigades fighting for the Republicans in the ongoing Spanish Civil War and worked closely with the Communist Party of France to help Yugoslav communists emigrate. In August 1937 he entered Spain to join the war himself and became a political commissar attached to the CXXIX International Brigade with the rank of captain. Following the defeat of the Republican forces in 1939, Kveder, alongside many of his comrades, was interned in prison camps in France and Germany until his escape in July 1941.

=== World War II and later life ===
Months before Kveder's return to Slovenia in 1941, the Axis invaded Yugoslavia and an active World War II in Yugoslavia was taking place. Immediately following his escape, he re-established contact with the communist party and joined the Yugoslav Partisans fighting against the Axis occupation. He played an active role on the Slovene Front and in 1943 became Chief of the General Staff of the National Liberation Army of Slovenia. During the war he was described by allied observers as being particularly hostile toward the Americans and British, instead favoring a pro-Soviet stance. Following the war, he continued his career in the Yugoslav People's Army and from 1946 to 1948 attended the K. Е. Voroshilov Higher Military Academy in the Soviet Union. Upon his return, Kveder was appointed deputy commander of the Belgrade Military Academy and also served as editor in chief of the newspaper Vojno delo.

Kveder began his political career in 1945 when he became Governor of Zone B of the Free Territory of Trieste, then jointly occupied by the Allies and Yugoslavia. In 1956, he was appointed ambassador to Ethiopia. In 1958, he briefly served as ambassador to West Germany before being reassigned as ambassador to India that same year, a position he held until 1962. In 1962, Kveder was appointed Assistant Secretary of State for Foreign Affairs and held this post until 1965, when he was appointed as ambassador to the United Kingdom. Kveder died in Belgrade in 1966 at the age of 50 and was buried in the Tomb of National Heroes in Ljubljana.

== See also ==
- Yugoslav volunteers in the Spanish Civil War
- List of governors of the Province of Trieste
