= Monte Cocusso =

Mountain in Italy and Slovenia

- Kokoš
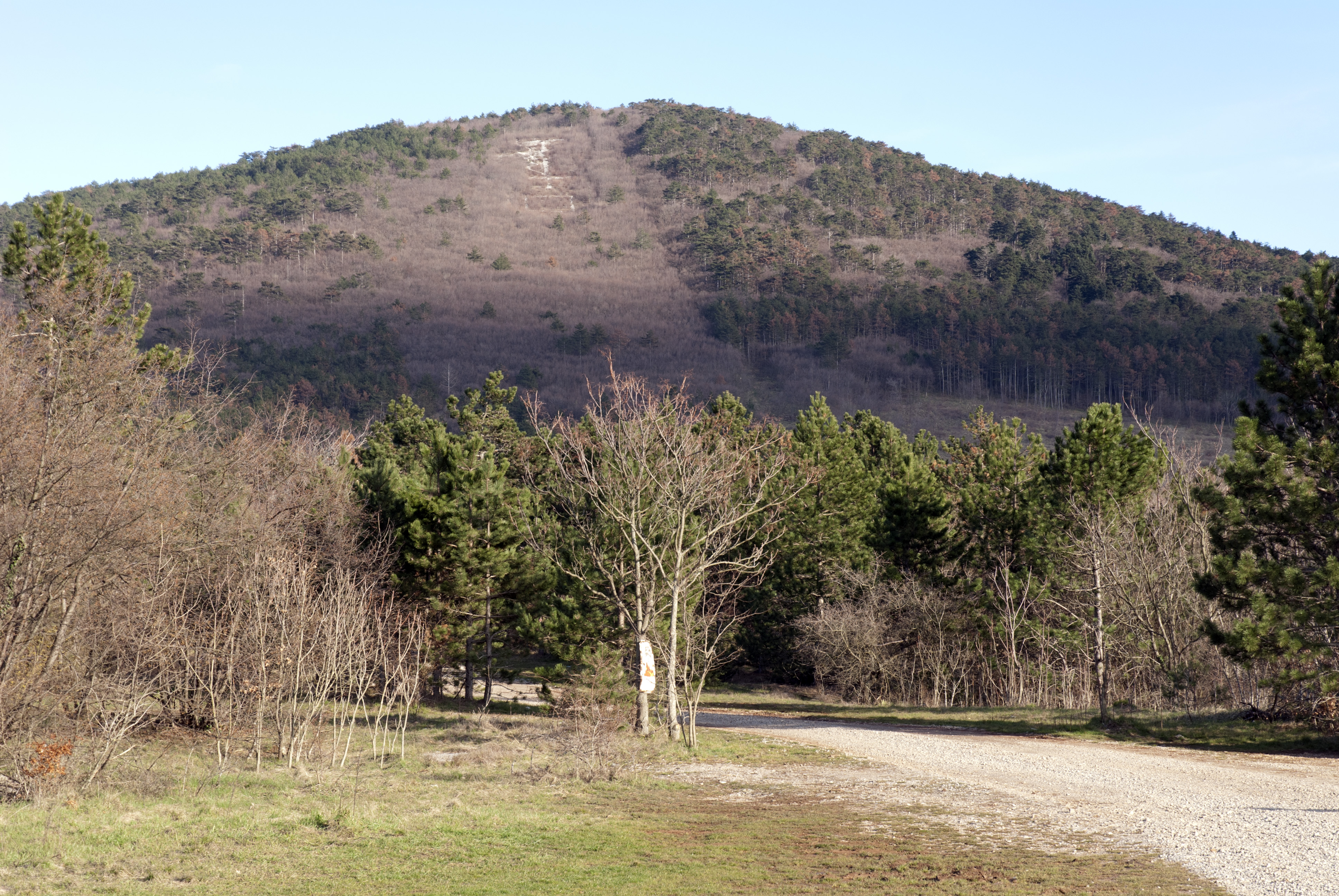

Highest point
- Elevation: 672 m (2,205 ft)
- Coordinates: 45°38′42″N 13°53′34″E

Geography
- Location within Italy
- Location: San Dorligo della Valle / Dolina, Sežana
- Countries: Italy and Slovenia
- Region(s): Friuli-Venezia Giulia, Coastal–Karst Statistical Region
- Parent range: Dinaric Alps

Mount Cocusso (Kokoš in Slovenian) is a mountainous relief on the border between Italy and Slovenia. It is the highest mountain in the Trieste Karst.

== Etymology ==
In centuries past, local people referred to Mount Cucusso in a variety of ways. The inhabitants of Basovizza nicknamed it Maček ("Cat"), perceiving in it a resemblance to a large cat with glowing eyes (two bonfires were often lit on Velika Groblja and near Jirmanec). In Lokev, a village in Slovenia just a few kilometers from Italy, the place name Ožeg ("Burned," from the Slovene vžgati, meaning to kindle) took hold, following a fire that developed on the northern slope and spread to the outskirts of the town. Finally, the people of Grozzana called the mountain Golina, from the Slovene Gol ("bare.") The eastern slope was in fact stony, devoid of trees and shrubby vegetation.

On the Josephinische Landesaufnahme maps the area of Mount Cocusso has marked toponyms:

- Berg Monte Kokos, Jermantze = Jirmanec, Berg Hora (i.e. Gora) = Obrovnik
- Berg Tusti Verh (tolsti = fat) = Vel. Gradišče.

Some authors, such as the Slovenian Boris Čok, report that the present name Cocusso would derive from the oronym Golina. Golina would have been translated, by assonance, into Gallina (hen), later retranslated into Kokoš (Hen in Slovene) and finally toponymically Italianized into Cocusso.

Dante Cannarella, a scientific popularizer and author of numerous publications on Trieste and the Karst, provides another explanation. According to him, Cocusso is a modern toponym, the Italian form of Kokus, which in Slavic languages has no meaning but is simply the Slovene euphony of the pre-existing Concusso, deprived of a letter since in Slovene grammar the n cannot precede the c. The first toponym was therefore Concusso (with n), already found in maps of the 17th century and in this form still in use in the first decades of the 20th century.

The toponym Kokoš is already present in the first Austro-Hungarian military maps of 1790. In the 1947 Treaty of Peace between Italy and the Allied Powers, the spelling Cocusso (without the n) appeared for the first time. Since then, all official documents and publications mention the mountain as Cocusso, thus accepting the Slovene version that removed the n from the original name Concusso, the etymon of which is traced back to the common root cuc, or kuk (peak), found in ancient pre-Roman idioms. The toponym Kuk, Kovk or Kouk is found in Slovenia in various localities.

== Morphology ==
The highest point (672 m a.s.l., 45°38′40″N 13°53′43″E) coincides with the demarcation line at milepost 79/23 and is the highest elevation in the province of Trieste. Other summits of the Cocusso are:

- in Italian territory, the Velika Groblja (662 m a.s.l., 45°38′26″N 13°53′41″E), a burial mound of stones dating back to the Bronze Age, a trigonometric and scenic point;
- in Slovenian territory, the Kokoš peak (663 m a.s.l., 45°38′42″N 13°53′34″E), near the demarcation line at the 79/20 mark;
- in Slovenian territory, the Jirmanec (670 m a.s.l., 45°38′39″N 13°54′01″E), where the Planinska koča na Kokoši hut is located;
- in Slovenian territory, the Žleb (655 m above sea level, 45°38′33″N 13°54′21″E).

The ridge continues in an easterly direction descending to an elevation of 627 m a.s.l. (45°38′25″N 13°54′50″E), a pass that is considered the physical boundary between Cocusso, its satellite elevations, and the Greater Castellaro (Veliko Gradišče, 742 m a.s.l., 45°38′24″N 13°55′43″E).

Mount Cocusso can be reached by CAI trails 3 and 28, which, from Basovizza, Grozzana, or Pesek, lead to the Jirmanec peak, connected with numerous trails or cart tracks also from the Slovenian slopes.

== Flora and fauna ==
The vegetation is mainly characterized by extensive black pine forests. On the western slope, at 550 m above sea level, there is an experimental plot of Greek fir, planted by Austrian foresters in 1884. Just above, at an elevation of 643 m a.s.l., is a hundred spruce trees, planted in 1936. The southern slope is home to the typical karst thicket of European hop-hornbeam. A few large trees are notable, including an imposing small-leaved linden (circumference 353 cm) and an isolated beech (circumference 273 cm).

The forests of Mount Cocusso are the habitat of many animal species. Prominent in terms of distribution is the roe deer, which, with about thirty heads per hundred hectares, reaches one of the highest densities in Italy. Wild boars, potentially harmful to crops, foxes and squirrels abound. More difficult to encounter are hares, badgers and weasels. From the overlooking Rosandra Valley, the common raven and the Eurasian eagle-owl travel to the Cocusso. Common are magpies, jays, buzzards, hoopoes, green and great spotted woodpeckers as well as numerous species of corvids. Birds that are not resident but are reported with some frequency include the golden eagle, honey buzzard and short-toed eagle. Bears and, more rarely, wolves have occasionally been sighted.

In the vicinity of Basovizza, the karst heath on the slopes of Cocusso has undergone restoration aimed at reintroducing grazing.

== Places of interest ==
- Between the Kokoš and Velika Groblja elevations, there is a stone boundary marker (45°38′37″N 13°53′57″E), dating from 1818, that divided the City of Trieste from the Schwarzenegg Seignory and the Seignory of San Servolo.
- On the Slovenian northwestern slope of Mount Cocusso, a huge stone inscription had been erected in the period of the former Yugoslavia, praising Tito. Repeatedly removed and restored, in 2004 it was the subject of an institutional clash between the Province of Trieste and the Republic of Slovenia. The subject of the dispute was the appropriateness of maintaining such an inscription, for some "exalting the political and moral leader of the tragic military occupation of Trieste in May 1945," for others a reminder of "the role Tito played during the struggle for liberation from fascist occupation."
- Near Mount Cocusso, between the settlements of Pesek and Draga, are the ruins of an old icehouse (jazera) (414 m above sea level, 45°37′46″N 13°53′11″E), once used for ice production and storage.

== Excursions ==
- Cocusso is a popular destination for excursionists, hikers, sportsmen and mountain bikers. It regularly hosts a number of competitive events, including the Kokoš Trail and the Gorskega teka na Kokoš. At the turn of 2011 and 2012, the 111-days of Kokoš was held, a non-competitive challenge that rewarded the most individual ascents in a 111-day time frame.

== Image gallery ==
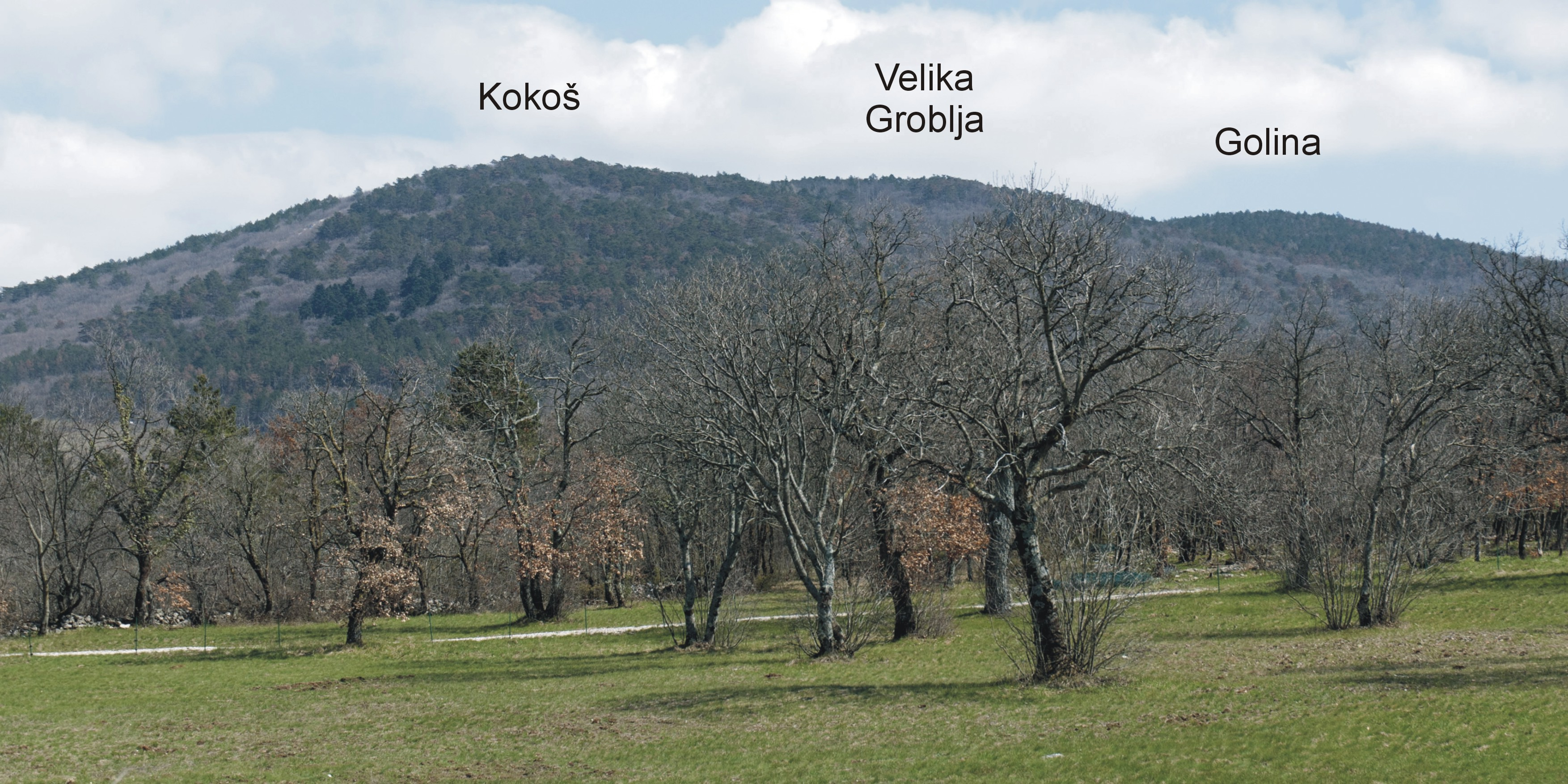
Mount Cocusso (southern slope of Basovizza)

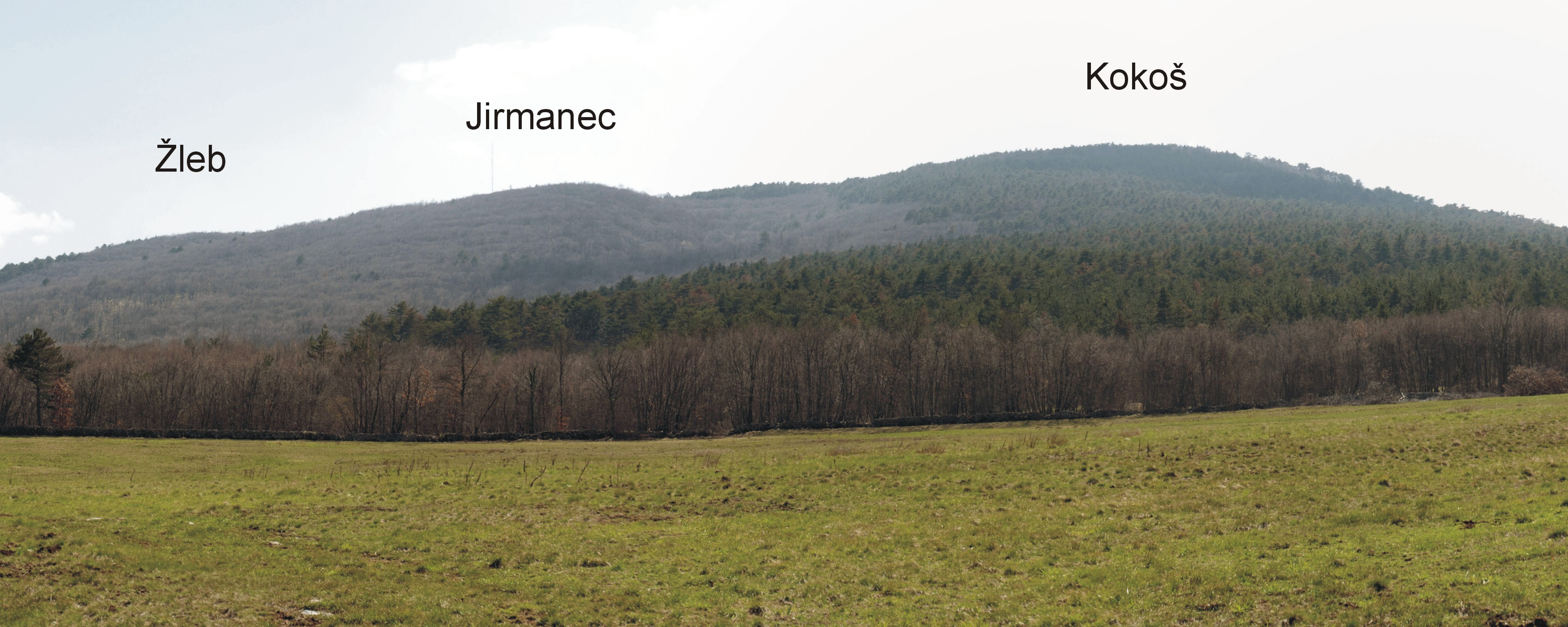
Mount Cocusso (northern slope)

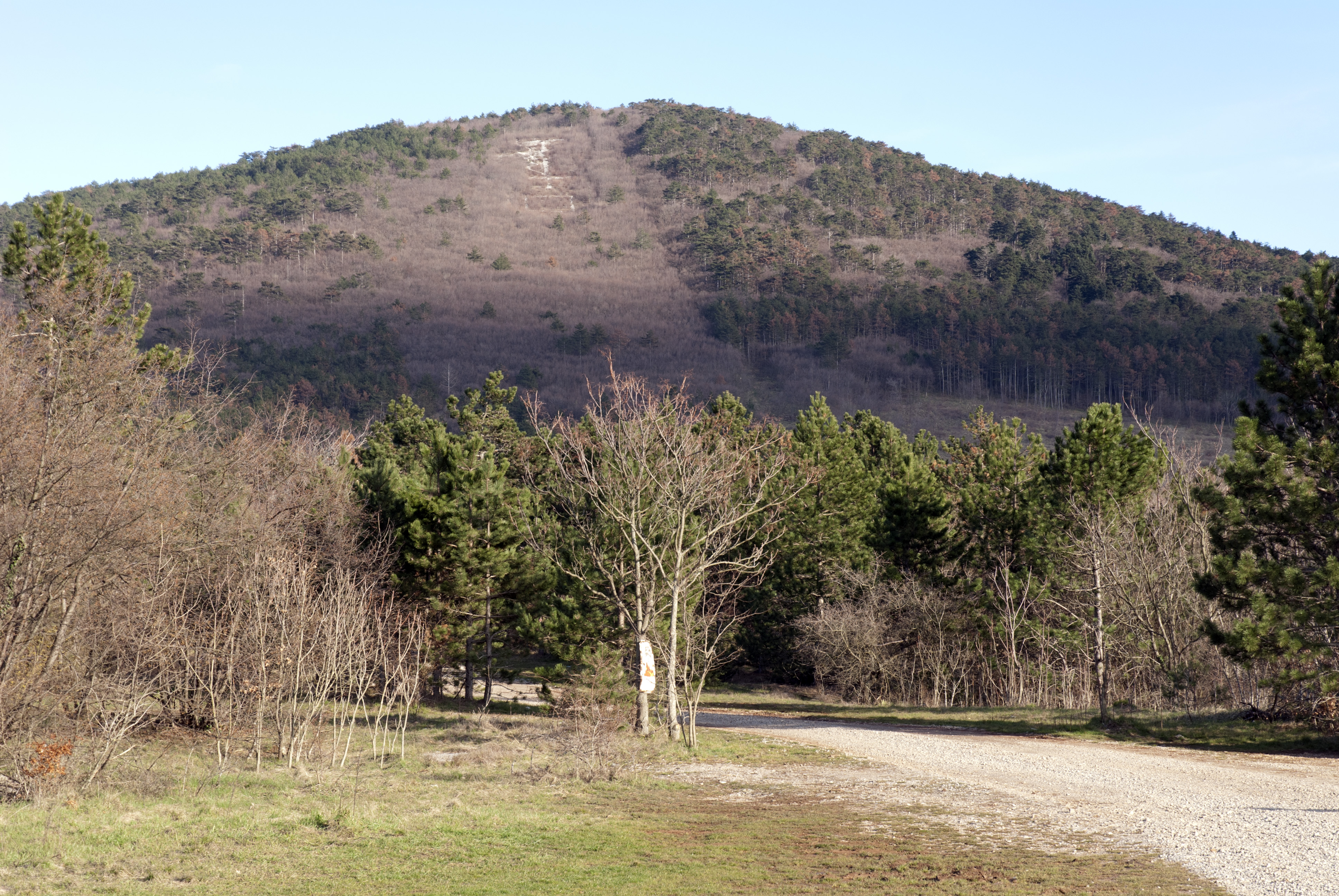
Mount Cocusso (western slope)

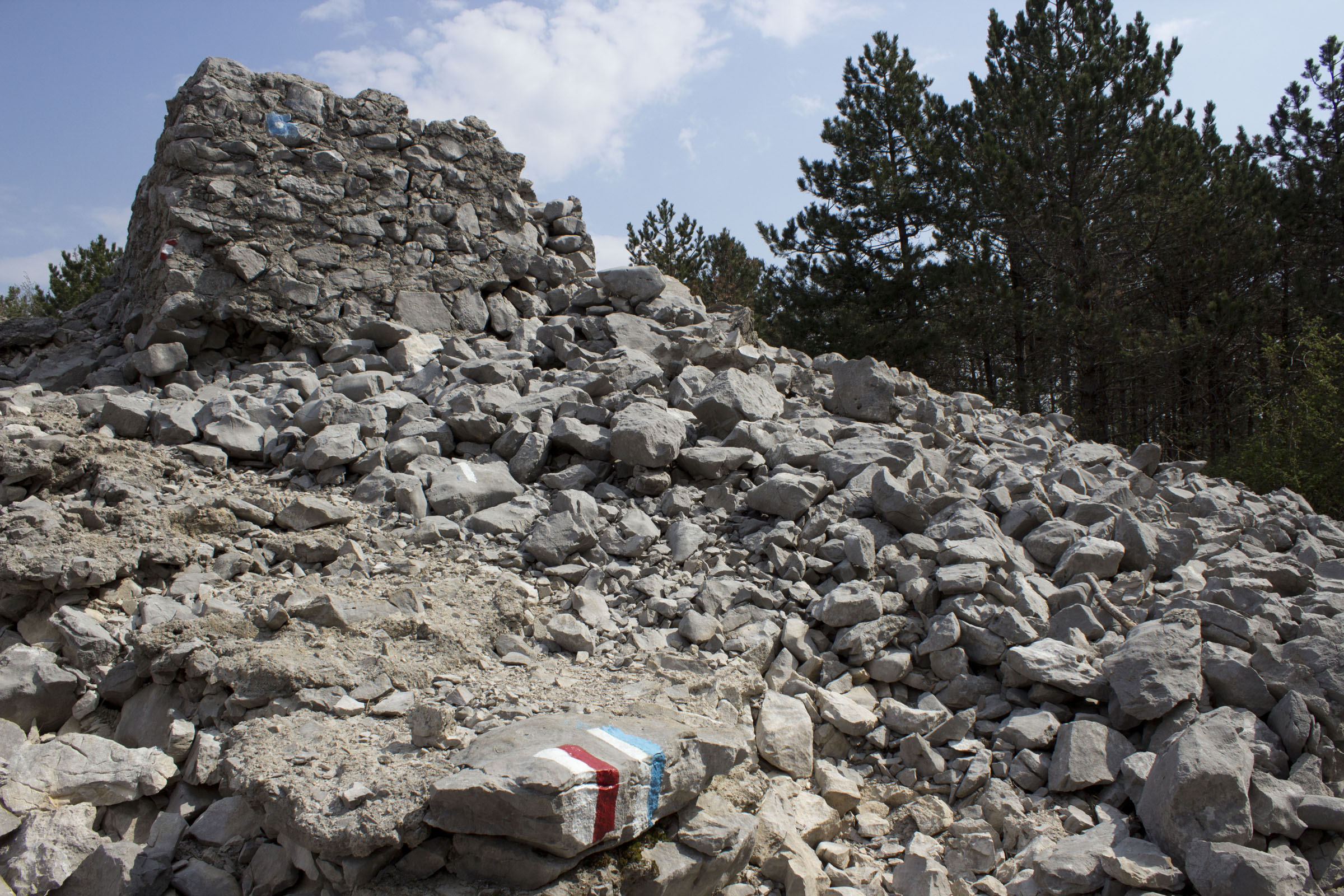
Velika Groblja

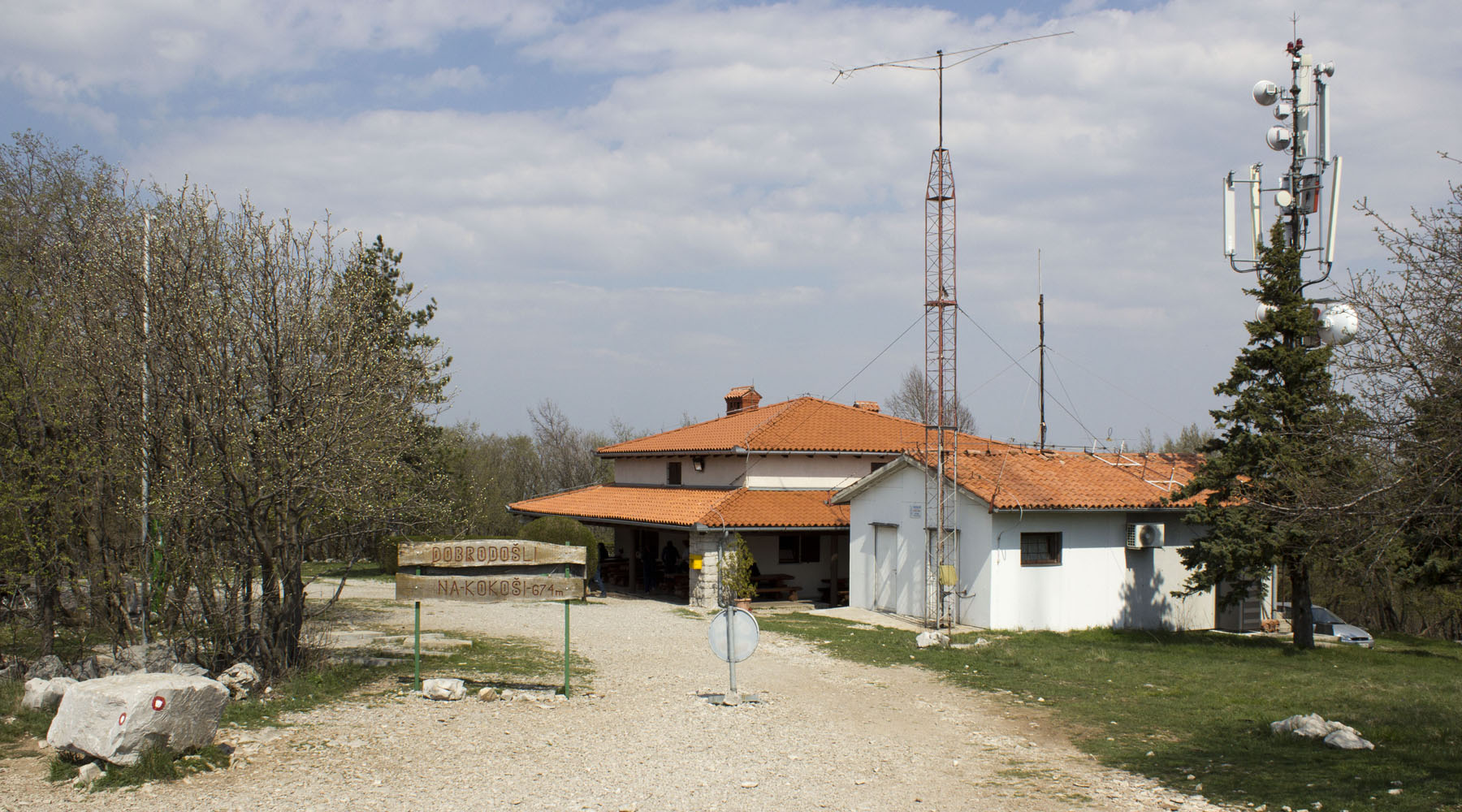
Planinska koča mountain hut

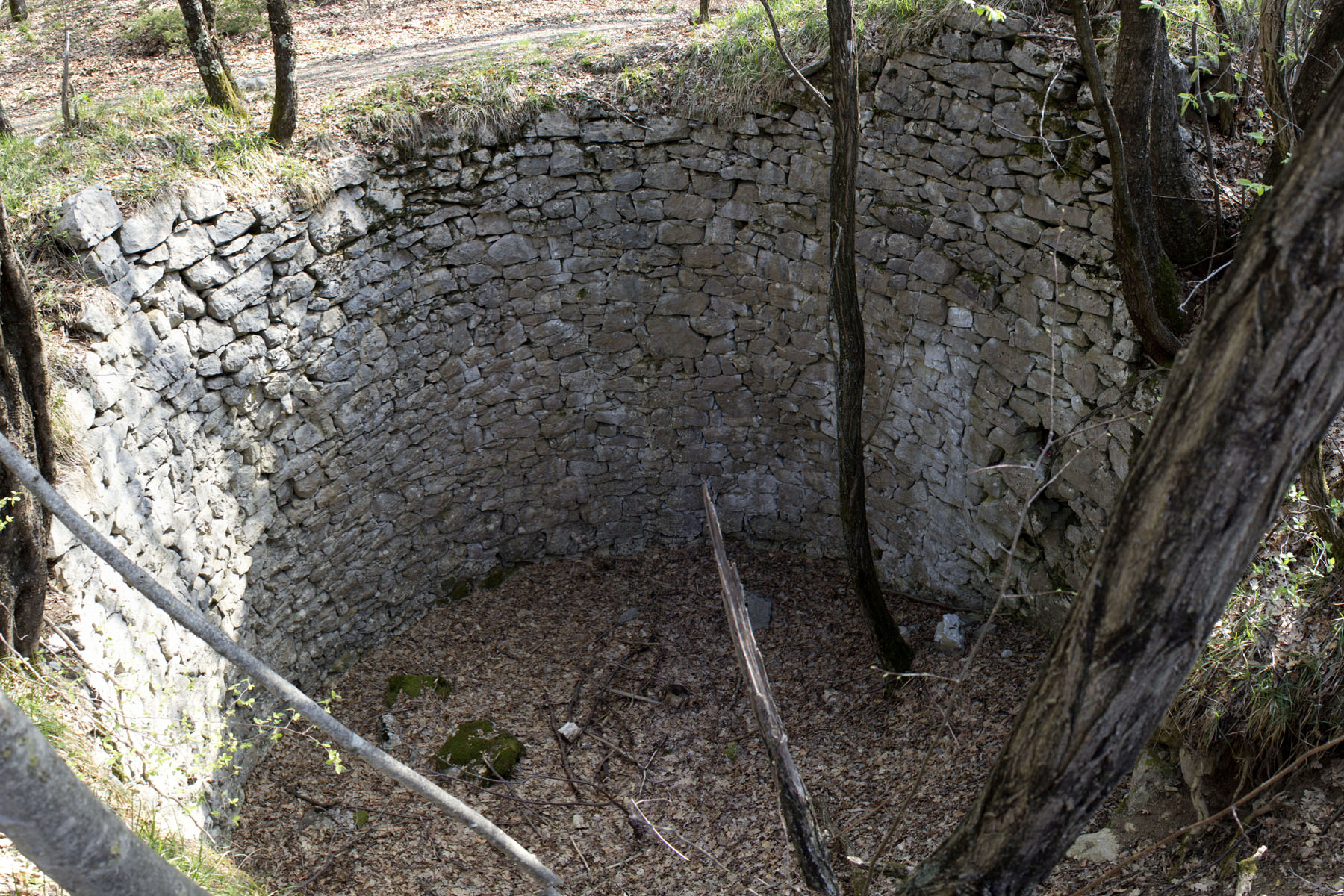
The icehouse (jazera) of Draga

== See also ==
- Karst Plateau
- Karst
- Rosandra Valley

== Bibliography ==
- Dante Cannarella (1994). Itinerari carsici 14. Il monte Cocusso. Trieste: Italo Svevo.
- Associazione Sportiva e Culturale dei Corpi Forestali del Friuli Venezia Giulia (2000). Boschi senza confini. Escursioni nelle foreste di Friuli Venezia Giulia, Slovenia e Croazia. Portogruaro: Ediciclo Editore.
- Fabio Fabris (2005). Carso senza confini. Portogruaro: Ediciclo Editore.
- Čok, Boris (2012). V siju mesečine. Ustno izročilo Lokve, Prelož in bližnje okolice. Ljubljana: Založba ZRC. ISBN 978-961-254-380-8.
- "Josephinische Landesaufnahme 1763–1787 für das Gebiet der Republik Slowenien". zimk.zrc-sazu.si (in Slovenian).
