= Tomb of National Heroes (Ljubljana) =

World War II memorial in Slovenia

- The tomb in 2008
- Interactive map of Tomb of National Heroes
- Location: Ljubljana
- Coordinates: 46.0515°N 14.5003°E
- Designer: Edo Mihevc (architect), Boris Kalin (sculptor)
- Type: Sculpture
- Completion date: 1949

The Tomb of National Heroes (Slovene: Grobnica narodnih herojev, also nagrobnik narodnih herojev) in Ljubljana, Slovenia is a tomb and a monument for the national heroes of the World War II resistance struggle in Slovenia, created in 1949. The designers of the tomb and the monument were the architect Edo Mihevc and the sculptor Boris Kalin. It stands next to Šubic Street (Šubičeva ulica), at the southern side of National Heroes Square (Trg narodnih herojev), west of the National Assembly Building. It has been protected as a cultural monument of local significance.

The tomb is located underground, and a monument in the shape of a sarcophagus stands beside it, in the shade of the trees on the western side of the National Assembly Building. Since it was installed, the monument has been modified several times and placed on a granite base. The eastern and western faces of the sarcophagus are covered by bronze reliefs depicting scenes from the Second World War. A patriotic epitaph, written by the poet Oton Župančič, runs along the top edge. It was designed in December 1948 as one of his last works and carved in 1949.

== National heroes of Yugoslavia buried in the tomb ==
- Named on the northern face of the sarcophagus
  - Tone Tomšič, a.k.a. Gašper (1910–1942), main resistance organizer in Slovenia, arrested and executed by Italian forces
  - Slavko Šlander, a.k.a. Aleš (1909–1941), resistance organizer, arrested and executed by German forces
  - Miloš Zidanšek, a.k.a. Vencelj (1909–1942), resistance organizer and commander, killed in battle with Italian forces
  - Franc Rozman, a.k.a. Stane (1911–1944), head commander of Slovenian partisan units, killed in an accident
  - Ivan Kavčič, a.k.a. Nande (1913–1943), resistance commander, killed in battle with Italian forces and the MVAC
- Named on the western face of the sarcophagus
  - Miha Marinko (1900–1983), resistance commander, later a prominent politician in Slovenia
  - Stane Semič, a.k.a. Daki (1915–1985), resistance commander, the first Slovenian recipient of the Order of the National Hero
- Named on the eastern face of the sarcophagus
  - Edvard Kardelj, a.k.a. Krištof (1910–1979), politician and philosopher, the most influential communist ideologue in Yugoslavia
- Named on the southern face of the sarcophagus
  - Milovan Šaranović (1913–1943), Montenegrin officer, Slovenian partisan commander
  - Dragan Jevtić (1914–1943), Serbian officer, Slovenian partisan commander
  - Ljubo Šercer (1915–1941), resistance organizer and commander, arrested and executed by Italian forces
  - Janko Premrl, a.k.a. Vojko (1920–1943), resistance commander, mortally wounded in battle
  - Majda Šilc (1923–1944), resistance nurse, killed in battle
  - Boris Kidrič (1912–1953), resistance politician
  - Dušan Kveder, a.k.a. Tomaž (1915–1966), resistance commander, later a diplomat and encyclopedist
  - Vinko Simončič, a.k.a. Gašper (1914–1944), resistance commander, killed in battle with German forces

== See also ==
- Monuments to the Slovene Partisans
