= Miloš Stamatović =

Yugoslav military officer

Governor of Zone B of the Free Territory of Trieste
- In office March 1951 – 25 October 1954
- Preceded by: Mirko Lenac

Personal details
- Born: 1914
- Died: 1988
- Awards: Commemorative Medal of the Partisans of 1941

Military service
- Allegiance: Yugoslavia
- Branch/service: Yugoslav People's Army
- Rank: Colonel
- Battles/wars: World War II

Miloš Stamatović (1914–1988) was a Yugoslav military officer who served as Military Governor of Zone B of the Free Territory of Trieste from 1951 to 1954, when the territory was finally split between Italy and Yugoslavia. During World War II, he served as political commissar of the South Herzegovina Partisan Detachment and engaged in prisoner exchange negotiations. In 1952, while military governor of Trieste, he tightened Yugoslav control over Zone B in response to decisions made in London which gave the Italians control over the civil administration of Zone A.

== See also ==
- List of governors of the Province of Trieste
- Trieste United States Troops
