= Option of nationality =

Concept in international law

In international law, the option of nationality or right of option refers to the right of an individual (optant) to choose their nationality when the sovereignty over their territory is transferred from one state to another. By choosing a nationality the optants exclude themselves from an ex lege determination of nationality, the automatic nationality change, allegiance to the new ruler, and potential forcing of new religion upon them. The provision was often included in peace treaties, allowing a population to maintain its original citizenship, typically on the condition of emigration from the ceded territory within a specified period. Some legal scholars view the right to choose one's nationality as an inherent component of the principle of self-determination.

There are three primary forms of the option of nationality:

- Positive option, by which individuals are given nationality of the state where they were born
- Negative option, which forces optants with nationalities obtained through both jus sanguinis (right of blood) and jus soli (right of the soil) to abandon their jus soli nationality
- Confirmative option, which is the most common form, requiring an individual to confirm their original nationality by emigrating from the ceded territory within a specified time frame.

The 1954 United Nations Survey of the problem of multiple nationality states that it is "widely held that, in case of change of sovereignty over a territory by annexation, or its voluntary cession by one State to another, the annexing State is obliged to grant its nationality to the inhabitants of the territory concerned who were citizens of the ceding State, at least if they have, at the time of annexation, their permanent residence in the ceded territory. In most instances these questions are settled by treaty between the States concerned, which also frequently grant a right of option to the inhabitants."

== History ==
The practice of allowing individuals to choose their nationality has its roots in a historical right called beneficium emigrandi, which permitted people to leave a territory that had been transferred to a new ruler. First appearing in the Capitulation Treaty of Arras in 1640, it became a standard practice for cession treaties and the national laws of states to grant inhabitants the ability to avoid shifting their loyalty to a new government by simply relocating. In the 1700s, treaties began to use the term "option," signifying a shift in emphasis from the right to emigrate to the right to keep one's existing nationality.

The concept gained prominence in the 19th century as a means for states to manage populations and secure national allegiance following border changes. The option was also used by states to expel populations considered hostile to their new sovereignty.

Until 1914, not many people chose to change their nationality, and the option was mainly exercised by civil servants and military personnel. Following World War I, a large number of people were affected by territorial shifts and changes in citizenship, and the application of the option of nationality reached its peak. While previously applied only for cession, option was for the first time granted for state succession (treaties with Austria, Hungary, and Turkey), as a safeguard against statelessness. Somewhat less frequently the concept was utilized after World War II and into the 1950s. Options have been granted not only in Europe but in the Americas, in Africa, East Asia, and the Pacific. In the 1990s, as the USSR, Yugoslavia, and Czechoslovakia no longer existed, the right to opt into a successor state’s nationality became more prominent than the right to opt out of it.

Optants were generally allowed to keep their movable property, while the rules for immovable property changed over time: originally, they had to sell it, but from the 19th century onwards, they were typically permitted to retain it after emigrating.

== Examples ==
=== 1697 Alsatian option ===
After the Treaty of Ryswick in 1697 the Alsatians were authorized to leave the kingdom of France with their property, or became the subjects of the French king.

=== 1839 Dutch nationality option ===
When Belgium gained independence from the Netherlands, the 1839 Treaty of London provided any Dutch national born within Belgian borders with the option of becoming Belgian or leaving the country and remaining Dutch.

=== 1860 Piedmont-Sardinia option ===
When Piedmont-Sardinia ceded Savoie and Nice to France the residents could opt for their nationality of origin and emigrating within a period of one year.

=== 1864 Danish nationality option ===
When Denmark ceded Schleswig to Prussia, the population were given the option for keeping their nationality on the condition of making the declaration and leaving Prussia within six years.

=== 1871 French nationality option ===
The 1871 Treaty of Frankfurt ended the Franco-Prussian War, allowing inhabitants of the newly-ceded Alsace-Lorraine region to opt for French nationality and leave, or become Germans. While approximately 508,000 individuals made the declaration, around 130,000 ultimately emigrated. Optants representing all social categories, though urban elites were overrepresented, settled mostly near the border or in the Paris area. Every third emigrant was between the ages of 17 and 21, and many were avoiding the obligatory German military service.

=== 1920s Hungarian option ===
Following the collapse of the Austro-Hungarian Empire, Hungarian optants relocated to Hungary and challenged the expropriation of their lands by Little Entente states before the League of Nations. This dispute created a significant international precedent by weighing the protection of individual private property against the sovereign rights of states to implement agrarian reforms.

=== 1947 Italian nationality option ===
The 1947 Treaty of Peace with Italy provided for the right of Italian citizens living in the territories that were to be taken over by Greece, France, and Yugoslavia to remain Italian citizens, provided the possibility of request by those states that they moved out of the area within a year; it granted a similar right of option to Italian citizens who habitually spoke "one of the Yugoslav languages (Serbian, Croatian or Slovene)" and who lived in Italian territory. Some 300,000 inhabitants of the taken-over areas—predominantly ethnic Italians, but also tens of thousands of Croats and Slovenes—eventually left, in what was later called the Istrian–Dalmatian exodus.
