= James Jewett Carnes =

American military leader (1899–1986)

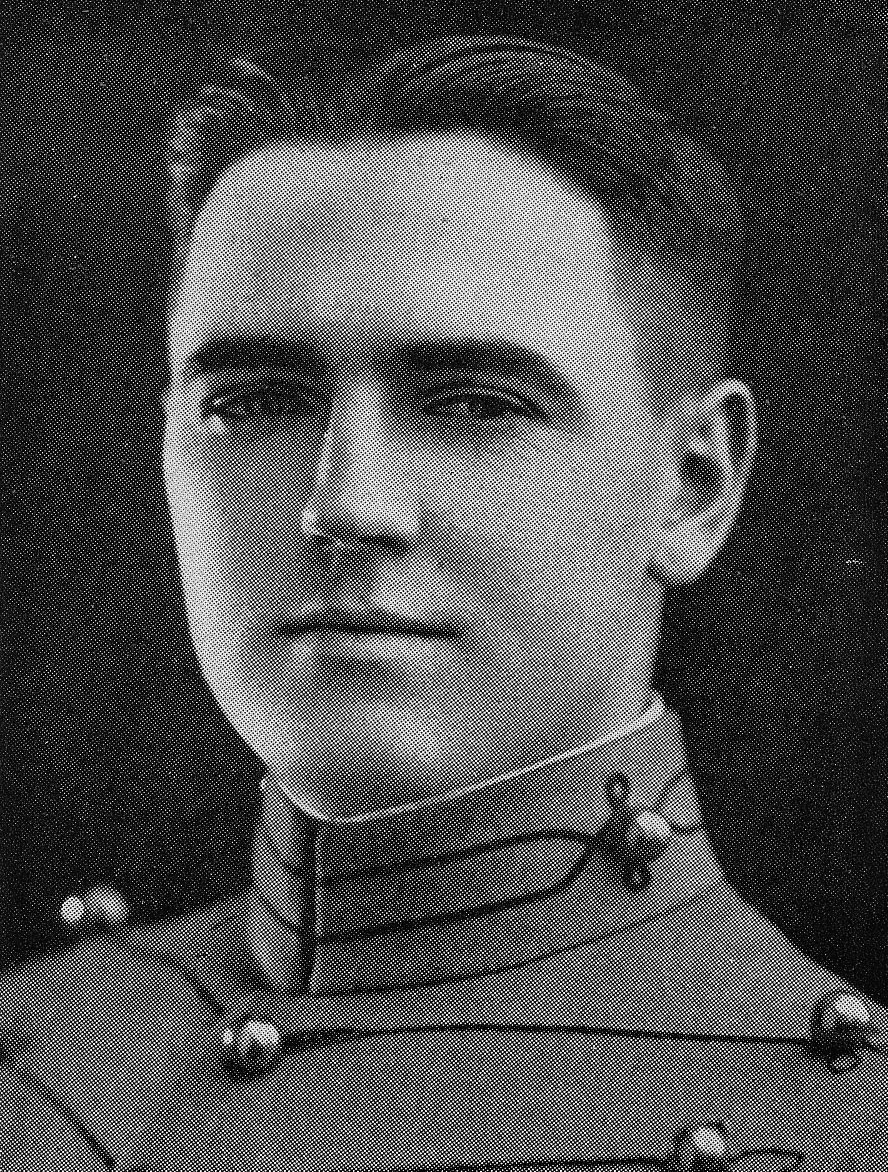
- At West Point in 1923
- Born: November 16, 1899; Royalton, Minnesota
- Died: July 19, 1986 (aged 86); Fort Lauderdale, Florida
- Education: United States Military Academy
- Occupation(s): Military officer, governor

James Jewett Carnes (November 16, 1899 – July 19, 1986) was an American military leader. He served as Governor of the Free Territory of Trieste in 1947.

== Life ==
Carnes was born in Royalton, Minnesota. He graduated from the United States Military Academy at West Point in 1923 and joined the United States Army. He died in Fort Lauderdale, Florida and was buried at Riverside Cemetery in Royalton.
