= John Winterton =

British Army major general

Major-General Sir John Winterton KCB KCMG CBE DL
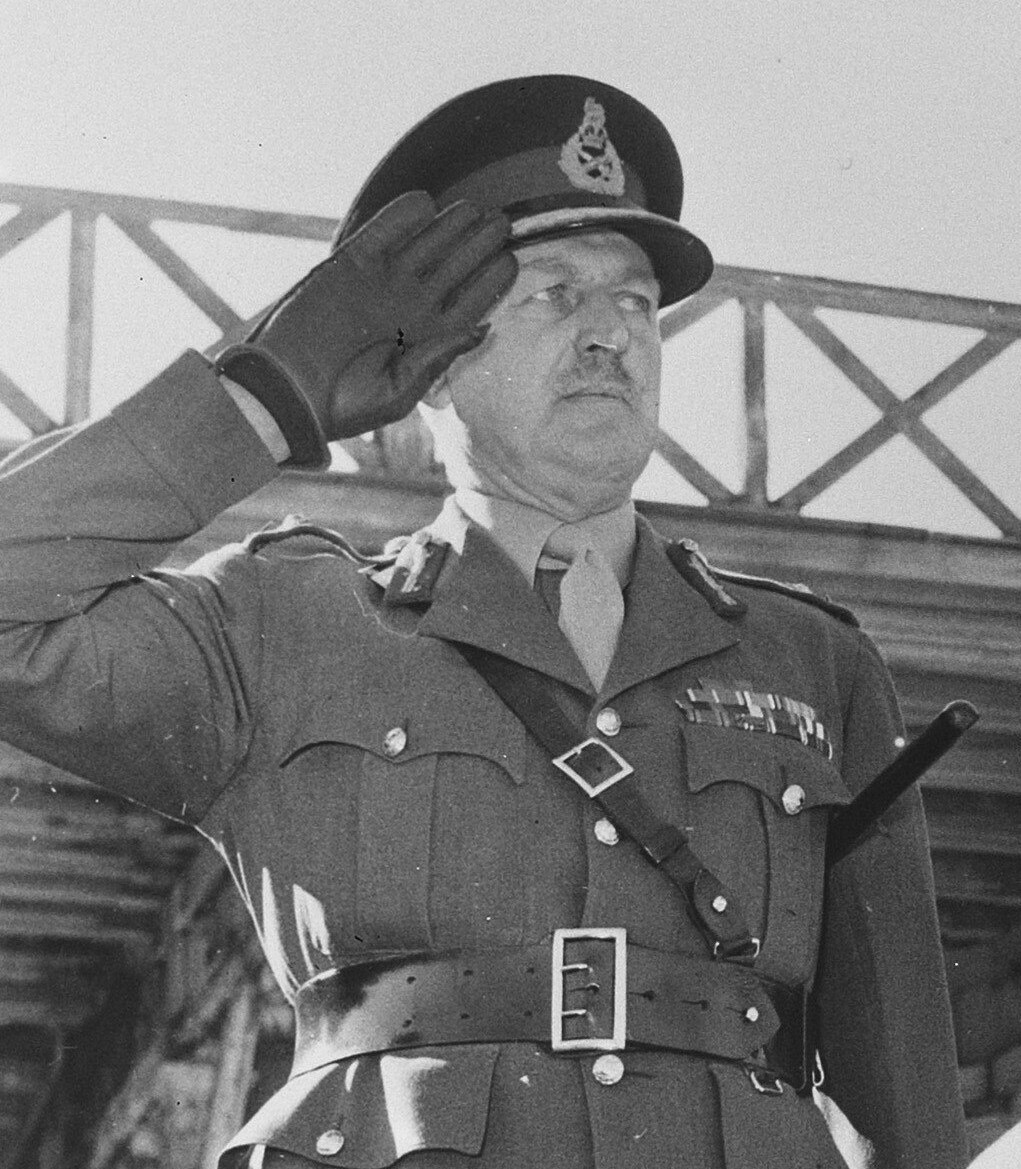
- Winterton in 1953
- Born: 13 April 1898; Newbury, Berkshire, England
- Died: 14 December 1987 (aged 89)
- Military career
- Allegiance: United Kingdom
- Branch: British Army
- Service years: 1917–1955
- Rank: Major-General
- Nickname: "Jack"
- Service number: 5778
- Units: Royal Field Artillery; Royal Artillery; Oxfordshire and Buckinghamshire Light Infantry
- Commands: 123rd Indian Infantry Brigade; Austria; Free Territory of Trieste
- Conflicts: World War I World War II
- Awards: Knight Commander of the Order of the Bath; Knight Commander of the Order of St Michael and St George; Commander of the Order of the British Empire

Major-General Sir Thomas John Willoughby Winterton KCB, KCMG, CBE, DL (13 April 1898 – 14 December 1987) was a British Army officer who was the Military Governor and Commander of the British and US Zone of the Free Territory of Trieste from 1951 to 1954.

== Military career ==
Born on 13 April 1898 at Newbury, Berkshire, Winterton was educated at Oundle School and at the Royal Military Academy, Woolwich, from where he was commissioned into the Royal Field Artillery in 1917, during World War I.

After the war, he married, in 1921, and was adjutant to a Territorial Army (TA) unit, from 1925 to 1929, before being posted to Burma in 1930 and later attended the Staff College, Quetta from 1936 to 1937. In 1938 he was sent to the Staff College, Camberley as an instructor, and transferred to the Oxfordshire and Buckinghamshire Light Infantry upon the recommendation of the Commandant of the Staff College, Camberley, Major General Bernard Paget.

He served in World War II initially as Deputy Adjutant and Quartermaster General for I Corps in which role he took part in the Dunkirk evacuation. He became Chief of Staff to the General Officer Commanding Burma, Harold Alexander, in 1942 and was given command of a brigade in Burma in 1943 and then in Italy in 1944.

After the war, he became Deputy Commissioner of the Allied Control Commission for Austria 1945 and then became British High Commissioner and Commander-in-Chief Austria in 1950. He went on to be Military Governor and Commander of the British and US Zone of the Free Territory of Trieste from 1951 to 1954 before retiring in 1955. Winterton was Colonel Commandant of the Oxfordshire and Buckinghamshire Light Infantry from 1955 to 1958 and Colonel Commandant of the 1st Green Jackets (43rd and 52nd) from 1958 to 1960. He lived in Newbury, Berkshire.

Winterton was also an Aide-de-camp to the King.

== Personal life ==
He married Helen Cross in 1921 with whom he was to have three sons.

One son, Cecil John Winterton (1922–2012), was an Anglican priest from 1951 to 1955. He then converted to Catholicism, joined the Oratory of Saint Philip Neri in 1961 (taking the religious name "Gregory"), and was ordained as a Catholic priest in 1963. He was Provost of the Birmingham Oratory (1971-1992), and was also a teacher at St Philip's Grammar School, Birmingham.

Winterton died on 14 December 1987.

== Bibliography ==
- Smart, Nick (2005). Biographical Dictionary of British Generals of the Second World War. Barnsley, South Yorkshire: Pen and Sword Books. ISBN 1844150496.
