= Treaty of Osimo =

1975 treaty regarding Italian-Yugoslavian border

Treaty on the delimitation of the frontier for the part not indicated as such in the Peace Treaty of 10 February 1947
- Map of the Free Territory of Trieste and its division after the treaty
- Signed: 10 November 1975
- Location: Osimo, Italy
- Effective: 3 April 1977
- Parties: Italian Republic; Socialist Federal Republic of Yugoslavia
- Language: French

The Treaty of Osimo was signed on 10 November 1975 by Italy and Yugoslavia in Osimo, Italy, to definitively divide the Free Territory of Trieste between the two states: the port city of Trieste with a narrow coastal strip to the north-west (Zone A) was given to Italy; a portion of the north-western part of the Istrian peninsula (Zone B) was given to Yugoslavia.

The full name of the treaty is Treaty on the delimitation of the frontier for the part not indicated as such in the Peace Treaty of 10 February 1947. The treaty was written in French and became effective on 11 October 1977. For the Italian government, the treaty was signed by Mariano Rumor, Minister for Foreign Affairs. For Yugoslavia, the treaty was signed by Miloš Minić, the Federal Secretary for Foreign Affairs.

== Criticism in Italy ==
The Italian government was criticized harshly for signing the treaty, particularly for the secretive way in which negotiations were carried out, skipping the traditional diplomatic channels. Italian nationalists rejected the idea of giving up Istria since it had been an ancient "Italian" region together with the Venetian region (Venetia et Histria). Following the Treaty of London, Istria had belonged to Italy for the 25 years, 1919–1943, between World War I and the end of World War II, and the west coast of Istria had long had a sizeable Italian-minority population.

Some called for the prosecution of the then Prime Minister and the Minister of Foreign Affairs for the crime of treason, as stated in Article 241 of the Italian Criminal Code, which mandates a life sentence for anybody found guilty of aiding and abetting a foreign power to exert its sovereignty on the national territory. The treaty did not guarantee the protection of the Italian minority in the Yugoslav zone or for the Slovenian minority in the Italian zone. The question of the protection of minorities was already enshrined in the European Convention of Human Rights which has its own powerful Court, nonetheless linguistic and office-holding qualification protections were enshrined in later signing of protocols.

== Slovenian and Croatian independence ==
Slovenia declared its independence in 1991 and was recognized internationally in 1992. Italy quickly recognised Slovenian independence and accepted the accession of the new Slovenia to treaties concluded with Yugoslavia. The treaty's applicability was now in question, but Slovenia then released a declaration on 31 July 1992 saying that it would recognize the treaty.

Both Italy and Croatia have opposed any changes to the treaty. Slovenia claimed that all debts owing to Italy for property transferred to Yugoslav sovereignty after 1947 had now been paid. By 1993, however, 35,000 Italians still claimed that money was owed to them.

In 1994, the Italian government, led by Silvio Berlusconi, demanded that additional compensation be paid, or efforts to integrate Slovenia into Western Europe would be halted. To that effect, it blocked talks for Slovenia's accession to the European Union until March 1995, when the new government, under Lamberto Dini, retracted the Italian demand. A cooperative pact was signed, led by Spain, with the effect of allowing Italian nationals who had resided in Slovenia for three years to purchase property there for up to four years after the pact was signed. It came into force during Slovenia's attempts to join the EU.

No similar declaration was made by the Croatia government, but the Croatian Parliament on 25 June 1991 accepted the borders of Croatia as part of Yugoslavia. However, Italy did not insist on a declaration from Croatia, and the treaty was never questioned by Croatia, which considers it to be valid.
