= Alfred Connor Bowman =

American lawyer and military officer (1904–1982)

- Born: December 18, 1904; Detroit, Michigan, U.S.
- Died: August 2, 1982 (aged 77); Los Angeles, California, U.S.
- Education: University of Michigan Law School
- Military career
- Allegiance: United States
- Branch: United States Army
- Service years: 1926–1960
- Rank: Colonel
- Service number: 0-56777

Alfred Connor Bowman (December 18, 1904 – August 2, 1982) was an American lawyer and military leader who was a key figure in the Allied Military Government for Occupied Territories after World War II, especially the areas of Venezia Giulia and Trieste. He also helped develop plans for military occupation of North Korea in 1950 while serving as chief of the army's Military Government Division.

== Life and career ==
Bowman was born in Detroit. He received his A.B. and J.D. degrees from the University of Michigan. He practiced law during the 1930s as the house counsel for a corporation, then served as deputy city attorney of Los Angeles.

During World War II he served in the United States Army, working with General Patton in North Africa and moving north into Italy. After the war he administered government in occupied Italy, Trieste specifically. He worked towards accord between Italian Republican, Yugoslav, and Allied Forces. Bowman advocated a preference for using Italian and Italian place names while in Trieste despite the diversity and 'melting pot' nature of the city. James Joyce's brother, Stanislaus Joyce, was his translator at this time.

Later, in the 1950s he was in the Office of the Judge Advocate General (OTJAG) for the First Army and investigated the Texas City Disaster.

Bowman died in Los Angeles in 1982.

== Bibliography ==
- Bowman, Alfred Connor. Zones Of Strain: A Memoir Of The Early Cold War. Stanford: Hoover Institution Press, 1982. ISBN 978-0-8179-7731-3

== See also ==
Italy–Yugoslavia relations
