= Rosandra Valley =

Coordinates: 45°36′59″N 13°52′47″E

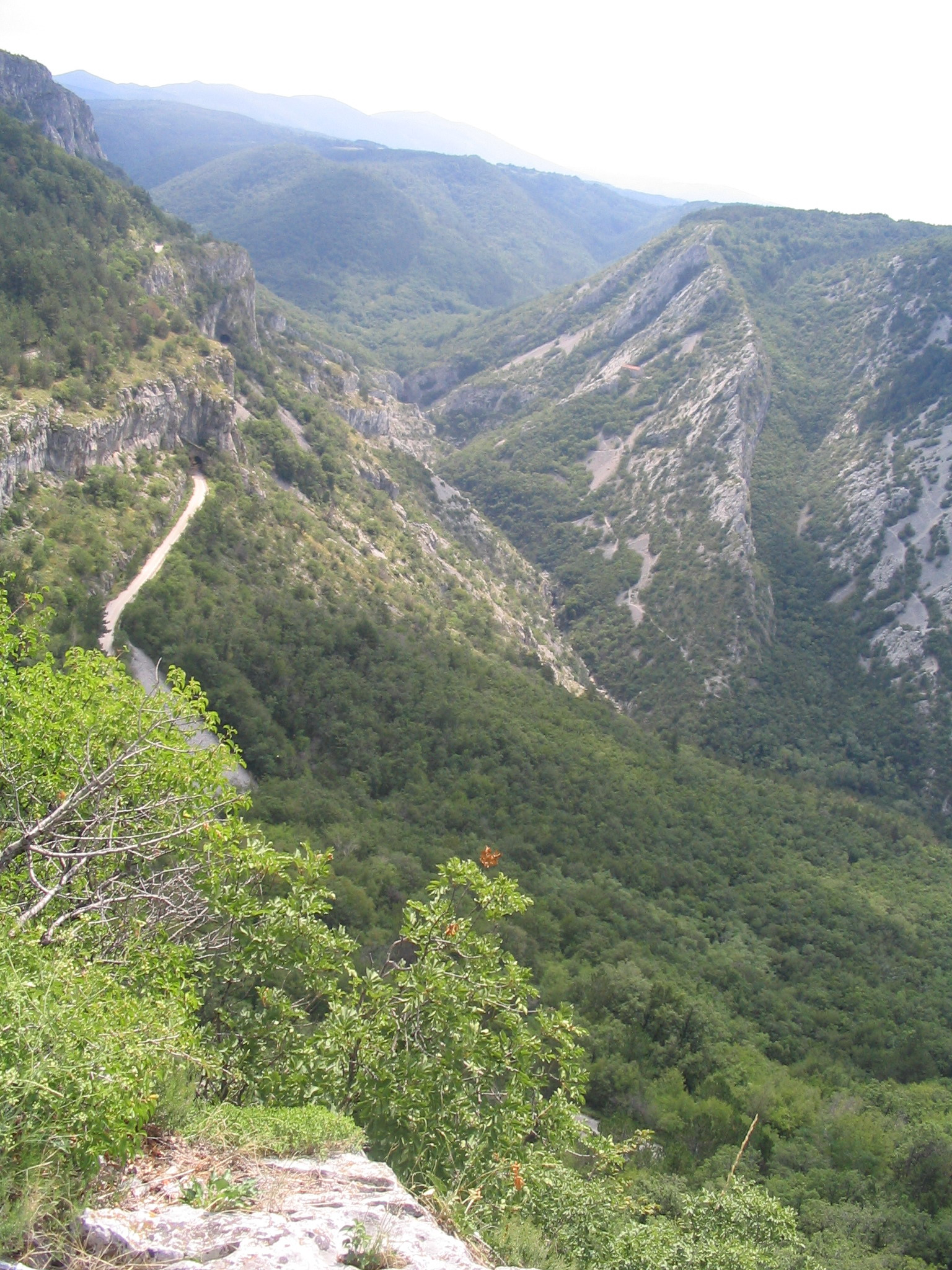
The Rosandra Valley near Trieste, Italy

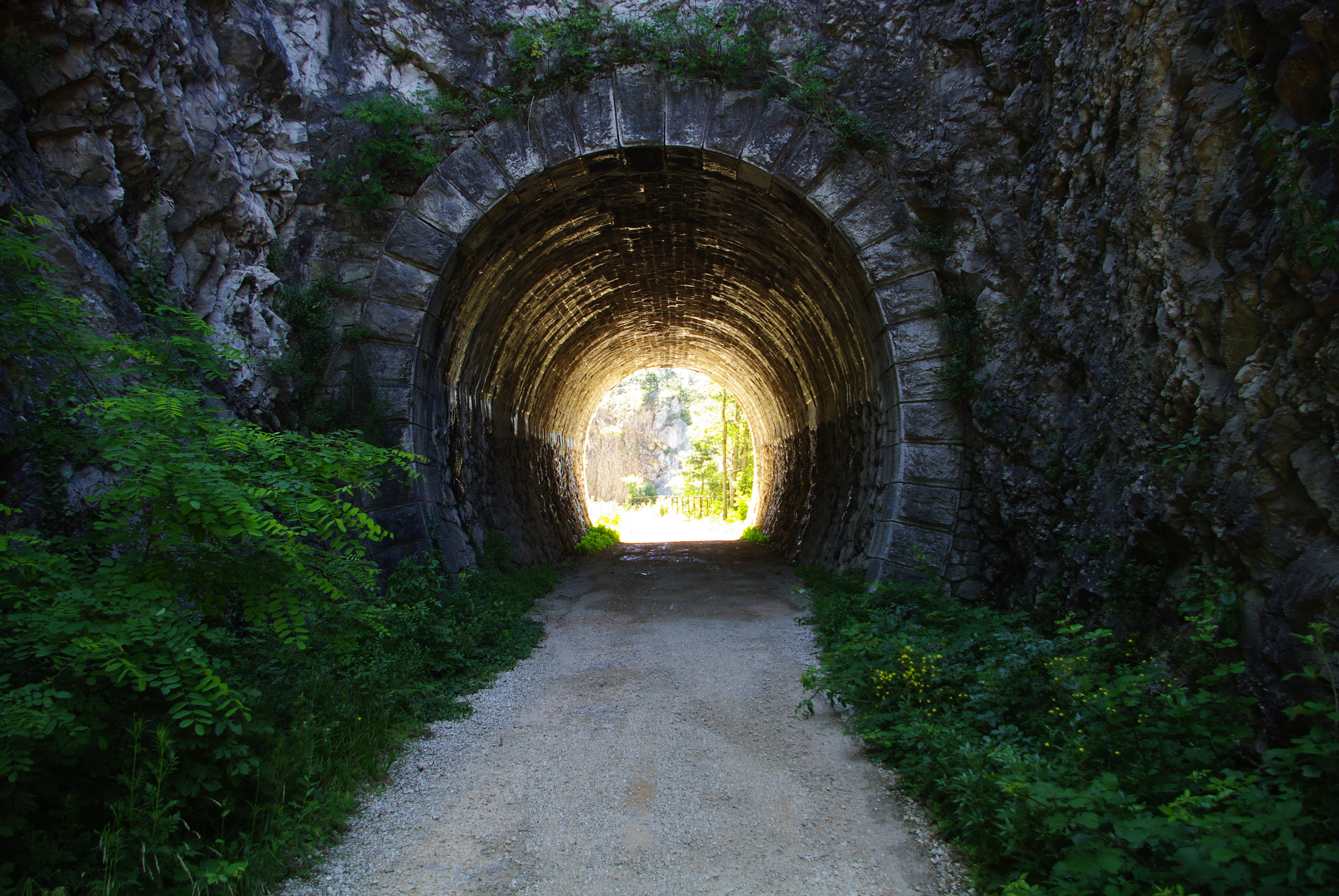
Trail near the Rosandra Valley

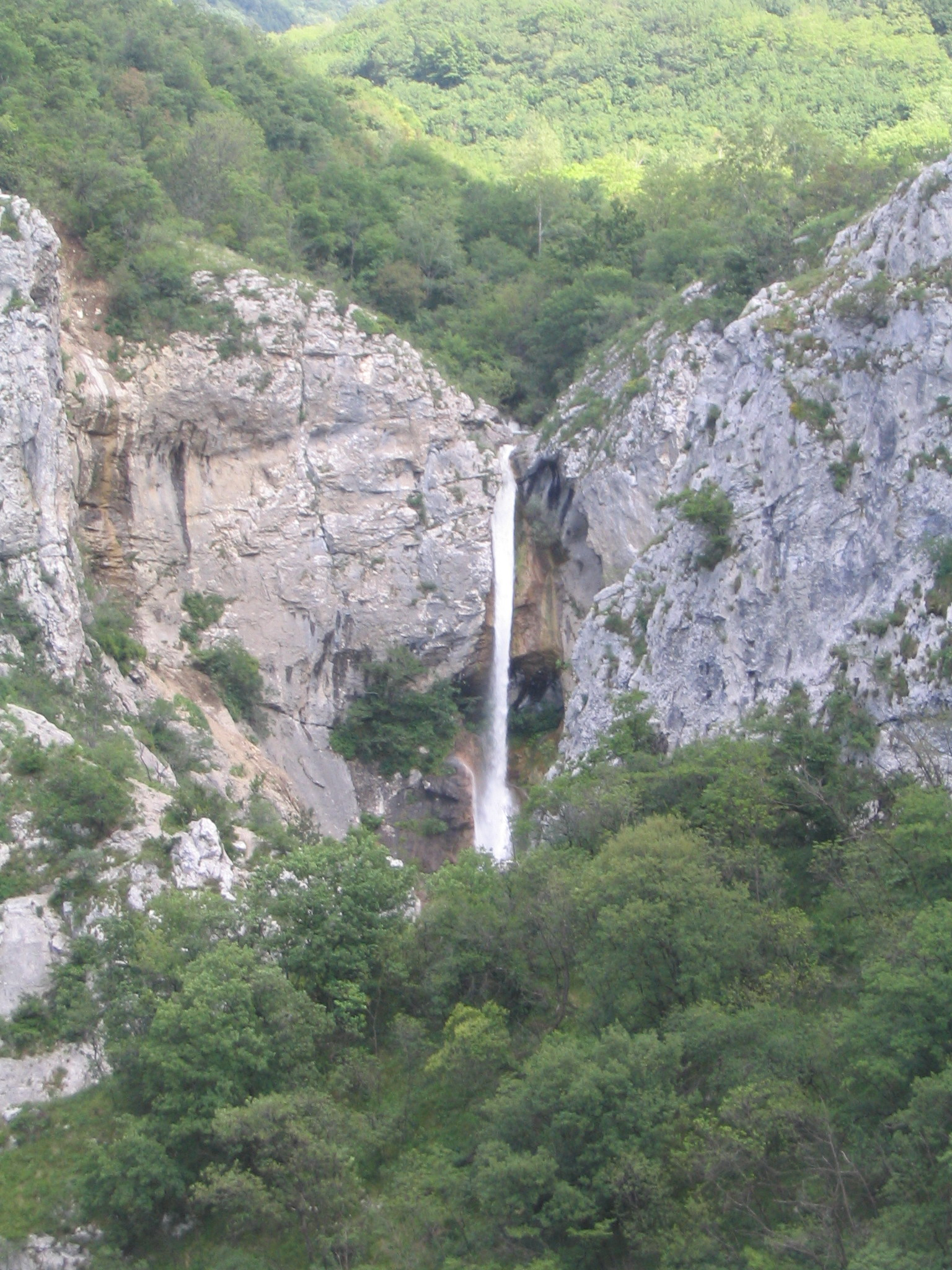
Supet Falls in the Rosandra Valley

The Rosandra Valley (Italian: Val Rosandra, Slovene: Dolina Glinščice) is a valley centered on the Rosandra River (Slovene: Glinščica) in the municipality of Dolina in the Italian region of Friuli-Venezia Giulia, between the city of Trieste and the border with Slovenia. It is part of a nature park, mostly set around the Rosandra River. The surrounding hills reach an elevation of 412 metres (1,352 ft). The northern end of the valley crosses the Italian-Slovenian border. The Rosandra Valley is part of the Karst geographical region. Tourist attractions in the valley are 40-metre (130 ft) Supet Falls near the village of Botazzo (Slovene: Botač) and Our Lady of Siaris Church (Italian: Santa Maria in Saris) perched high in the hills of the valley.

== Flora ==
The Rosandra Valley has considerable plant diversity: more than 1,000 fungi, 988 vascular plants, approx. 300 lichens, about 150 bryophytes (mosses and liverworts), and about 100 species of Myxomicetes, for a total of approximately 2,700 infrageneric taxa.

The Rosandra Valley reflects the history of the vegetation of the karst, but it has many original features. The geomorphology makes it unique in the Trieste Karst: agriculture was and is limited to small areas of flysch such as near Botazzo, grazing is today almost completely abandoned and even in the past it was made difficult by the steep and stony slopes. The valley still retains aspects of the prehistoric vegetation of the karst, especially on rocks and scree slopes. The landscape is different from that of the rest of the Trieste Karst. The climbers who use the rock walls as a school have wrongly compared it to an "alpine" landscape, whereas it rather recalls the great valleys of Dinaric Dalmatia, with the major forms of erosion and the alternation of shrubs and almost bare surfaces; also the geologic structures are similar, with fissured limestone, scree, etc., the species are often the same and grow in similar associations. Thus, certain sections of M. Carso are extraordinarily reminiscent of the hinterland of Rijeka in Croatia.

In the Rosandra Valley the relationships between vegetation and physical factors are clearer than in the Alps, where the complicated orography and the presence of many types of rocks create a complex pattern of ecosystems. In the Rosandra Valley the landscape can be read easily, because of the modest development of the reliefs and presence of only two dominant types of substrate: limestone and flysch. The areas with flysch have an almost "Apenninic", landscape, while those with limestone give rise to a "Balkan" landscape
