= Treaty of Paris between Italy and the Allied Powers =

1947 treaty between Italy and the Allies

Treaty of Paris (Italy)
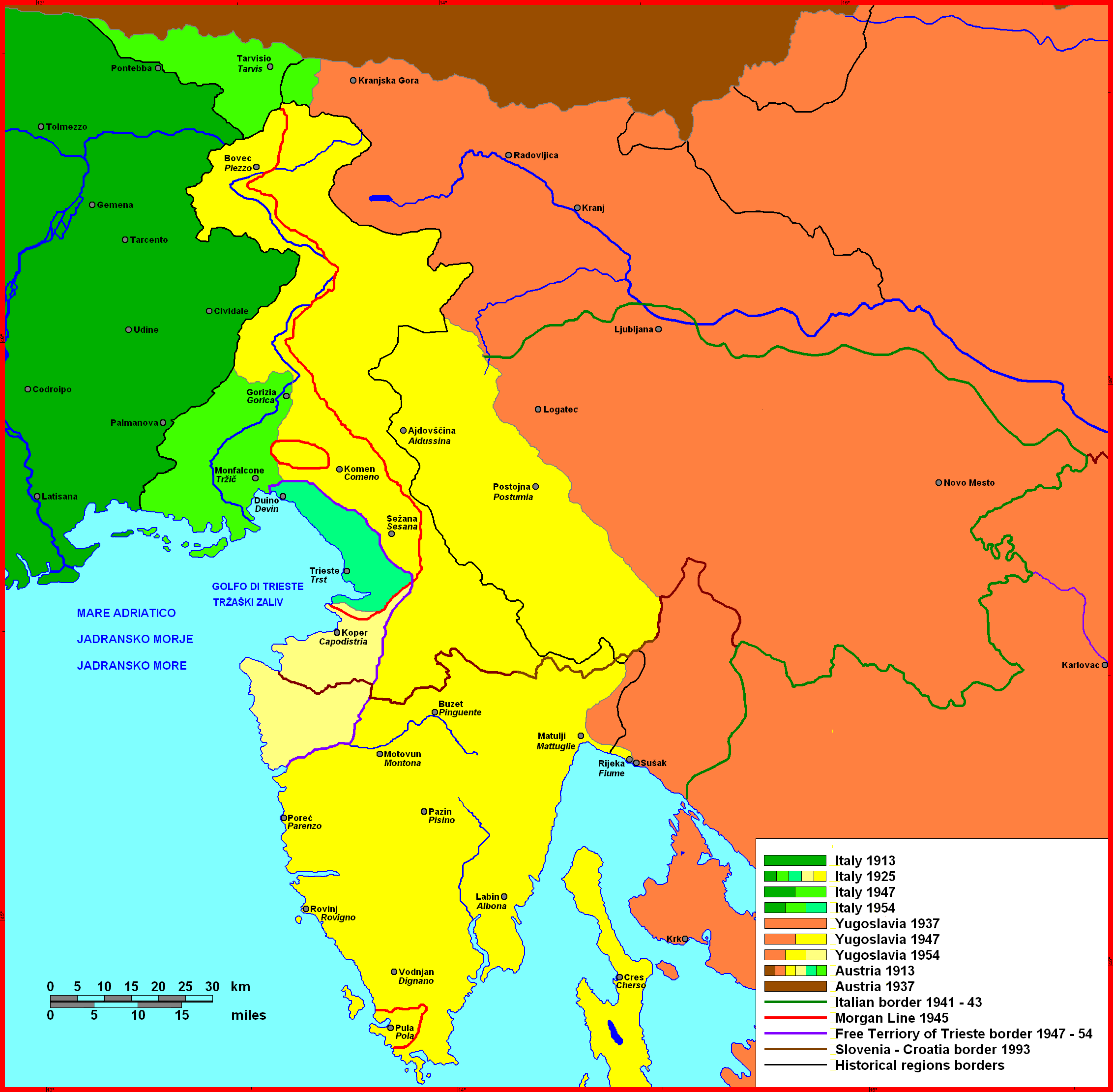
- Changes to the Italian eastern border from 1920 to 1975. The Austrian Littoral, later renamed Julian March, which was assigned to Italy in 1920 with the Treaty of Rapallo (with adjustments of its border in 1924 after the Treaty of Rome) and which was then ceded to Yugoslavia in 1947 with the Treaty of Paris Areas annexed to Italy in 1920 and remained Italian even after 1947 Areas annexed to Italy in 1920, passed to the Free Territory of Trieste in 1947 with the Paris treaties and definitively assigned to Italy in 1975 with the Treaty of Osimo Areas annexed to Italy in 1920, passed to the Free Territory of Trieste in 1947 with the Paris treaties and definitively assigned to Yugoslavia in 1975 with the Osimo treaty
- Signed: 10 February 1947
- Location: Paris, France
- Signatories: Italy France (Kingdom of Greece) Greece (Ethiopian Empire) Ethiopia (Socialist Federal Republic of Yugoslavia) Yugoslavia; Albania; United States; United Kingdom; Soviet Union Other Allied Powers: Australia; Belgium; Brazil; Canada; (Republic of China (1912–1949)) China; Czechoslovakia; Netherlands; New Zealand; Poland; South Africa
- Depositary: French Government
- Languages: French (primary), English, Italian

The Treaty of Paris between Italy and the Allied Powers was signed on 10 February 1947, formally ending World War II hostilities between the parties. It came into general effect on 15 September 1947.

The transfer of several territories in the eastern Adriatic that Italy had obtained following the Treaty of Rapallo in 1920 and the Treaty of Rome in 1924 was penalized, and the Free Territory of Trieste was established. A few territories were transferred to France. Italy renounced its colonial and overseas possessions, officially recognized Ethiopia and Albania as independent, and was required to pay war reparations. All Italian fascist organisations were to be banned.

== Territorial changes ==
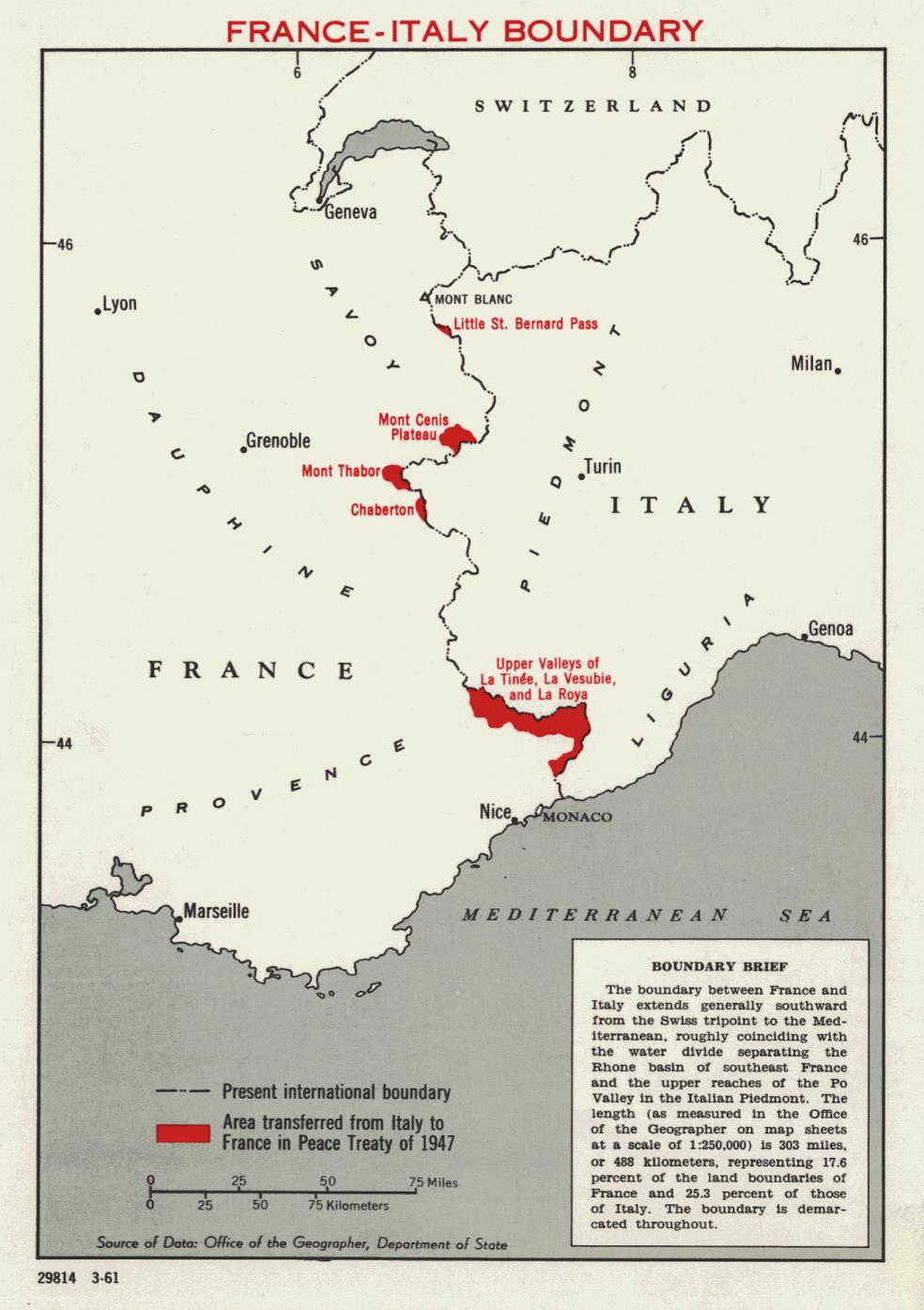
France-Italy Boundary after the Treaty of Peace

- Transfer of the Adriatic islands of Cres, Lošinj, Lastovo and Palagruža; of Istria south of the river Mirna; of the exclave territory of Zadar in Dalmatia; of the city of Rijeka and the region known as the Julian March to the Socialist Federal Republic of Yugoslavia;
- Transfer of the Italian Islands of the Aegean to the Kingdom of Greece;
- Transfer to France of Briga and Tenda, and minor revisions of the Franco-Italian border including Mont Cenis plateau, Mont Thabor, and Mont Chaberton
- Recognition of the independence of the People's Republic of Albania and transfer to Albania of the island of Sazan;
- Renunciation of claims to Ethiopia and restoration of the Ethiopian Empire;
- Renunciation of claims to colonies (including Libya, Eritrea and Somaliland) and dissolution of the Italian Empire;
  - Former Italian Somaliland was under British administration until 1950 when it became a United Nations Trust Territory under Italian administration. Italian Somaliland united with the newly independent State of Somaliland on 1 July 1960 and together they became the Somali Republic.
  - As provided by Annex XI of the Treaty, upon the recommendation of the United Nations General Assembly in Resolution 390 (V) of 2 December 1950, Eritrea was federated with Ethiopia on 11 September 1952. Eritrea gained its independence from Ethiopia de facto on 24 May 1991 and de jure on 24 May 1993.
- Cancellation of favourable commercial treaties with the Republic of China (including cessation of the Concession in Tianjin held by Italy since 7 September 1901)
- Trieste and the surrounding area were incorporated into a new independent state called the Free Territory of Trieste. In 1954, the administration of the Free Territory was handed over to the Italian Government, while the mandate of the Yugoslav Army was ceded to the Yugoslav Government with the Memorandum of Understanding of London regarding the Free Territory of Trieste. This was formalised by the 1975 Treaty of Osimo.

== Reparations ==
Italy was obliged to pay the following war reparations (article 74):

US$125 million to Yugoslavia (equivalent to 1.53 billion in 2024)
US$105 million to Greece (equivalent to 1.28 billion in 2024)
US$100 million to the Soviet Union (equivalent to 1.22 billion in 2024)
US$25 million to Ethiopia (equivalent to 306 million in 2024)
US$5 million to Albania (equivalent to 61.2 million in 2024)

The amounts were valued in the US dollar at its gold parity on 1 July 1946 ($35 for one ounce of gold). The reparations were to be paid in goods and services over a seven-year period.

== Military clauses ==
Articles 47 and 48 called for the demolition of all permanent fortifications along the Franco-Italian and Yugoslav-Italian frontier. Italy was banned from possessing, building or experimenting with atomic weapons, guided missiles, guns with a range of over 30 km, non-contact naval mines and torpedoes as well as manned torpedoes (article 51).

The military of Italy was limited in size. Italy was allowed a maximum of 200 heavy and medium tanks (article 54). Former officers and non-commissioned officers of the Blackshirts and the National Republican Army were barred from becoming officers or non-commissioned officers in the Italian military (except those exonerated by the Italian courts, article 55).

The Italian navy was reduced. Some warships were awarded to the governments of the Soviet Union, the United States, the United Kingdom and France (articles 56 and 57). Italy was ordered to scuttle all its submarines (article 58) and was banned from acquiring new battleships, submarines and aircraft carriers (article 59). The navy was limited to a maximum force of 25,000 personnel (article 60). The Italian army was limited to a size of 185,000 personnel plus 65,000 Carabinieri for a maximum total of 250,000 personnel (article 61). The Italian air force was limited to 200 fighters and reconnaissance aircraft plus 150 transport, air-rescue, training and liaison aircraft and was banned from owning and operating bomber aircraft (article 64). The number of air force personnel was limited to 25,000 (article 65). Most of the military restrictions were lifted upon Italy becoming a founding member of the North Atlantic Treaty Organization in 1949.

== Political clauses ==
Article 17 of the treaty banned fascist organisations ("whether political, military, or semi-military") in Italy.

Italy was obliged to secure all persons under its jurisdiction the enjoyment of human, civil, and religious rights, and was not to prosecute or molest Italians who expressed sympathy to Allied powers. Italian citizens in the territories transferred to other states were to become citizens of those states, unless they exercised the right of option for Italian citizenship within a year, which may have required them to move to Italy. Similarly, Italian citizens domiciled on Italian territory whose language was Serbian, Croatian, or Slovene were able to acquire Yugoslav nationality and may have been required to emigrate to Yugoslavia within one year.

== Annexes ==
A subsequent annex to the treaty provided for the cultural autonomy of the German minority in South Tyrol.

== See also ==
- Paris Peace Treaties, 1947
- Armistice of Cassibile
- Italian Instrument of Surrender
