= Basilica of Saint Mary of the Assumption, Muggia =

Church in Friuli-Venezia Giulia, Italy

Basilica of Saint Mary of the Assumption Basilica di Santa Maria Assunta Bazilika sv. Marije Vnebovzete
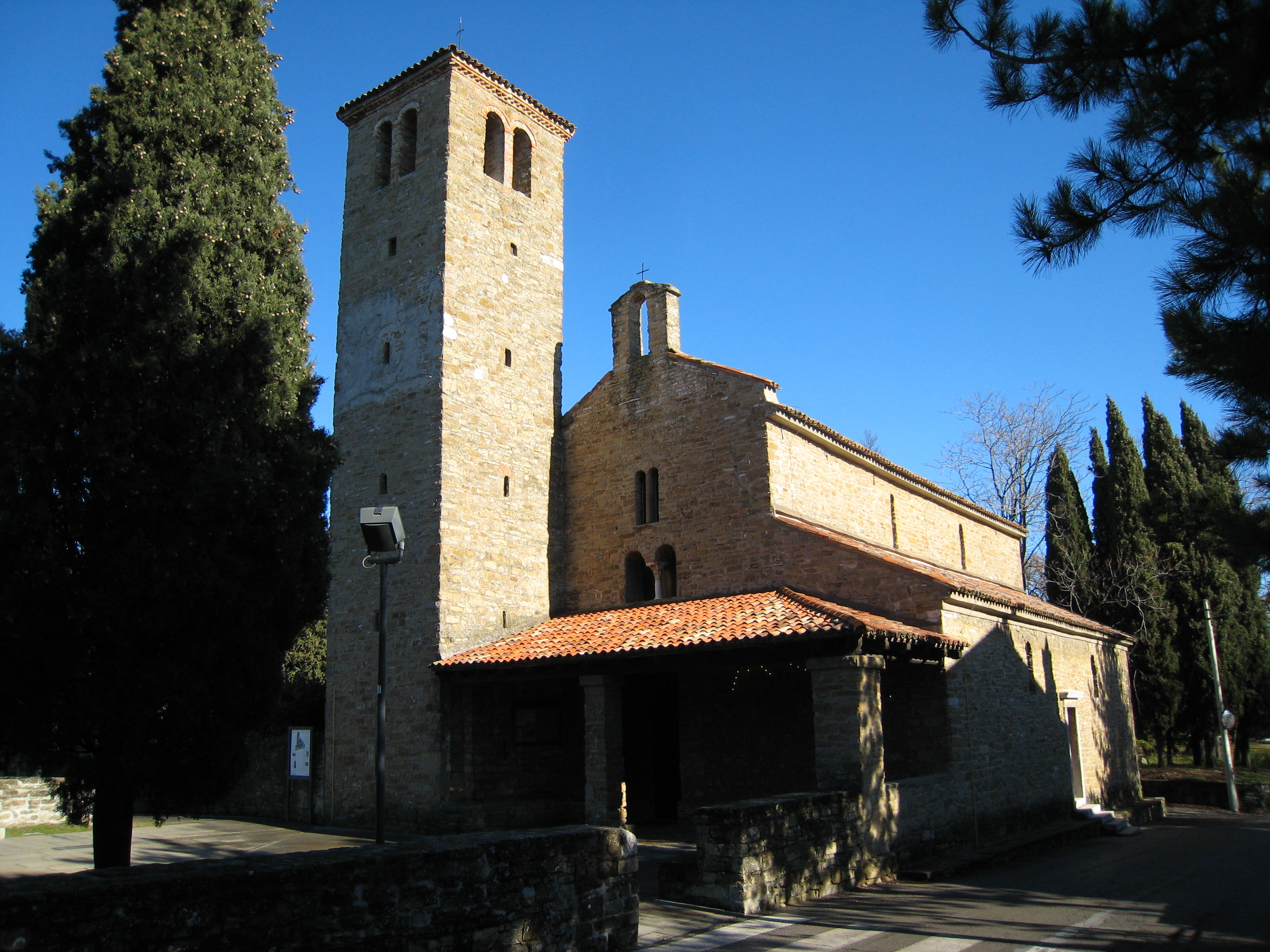
- The basilica in 2008

Religion
- Affiliation: Roman Catholic
- Diocese: Diocese of Trieste
- Rite: Roman
- Ecclesiastical or organizational status: Basilica

Location
- Location: Muggia Vecchia, Italy
- Interactive map of Basilica of Saint Mary of the Assumption; Basilica di Santa Maria Assunta; Bazilika sv. Marije Vnebovzete
- Coordinates: 45.6000°N 13.7526°E

Architecture
- Type: Church
- Style: Romanesque, Gothic
- Groundbreaking: 11th century
- Completed: 13th century

The Basilica of Saint Mary of the Assumption (Italian: Basilica di Santa Maria Assunta, Slovene: Bazilika sv. Marije Vnebovzete) is the parish church of Muggia Vecchia, in Muggia, near Trieste, Italy.

In the past it was believed that the town of Muggia Vecchia had ceased to be inhabited after its destruction by the Genoese of Pagano Doria in 1353. Indeed, it was destroyed, leaving the basilica standing, by the Triestines, in constant struggle against the people of Muggia due to the salt pans. It is thought that before the current church there existed a previous one, of which some parts of the structure have been preserved.

The current village of Muggia Vecchia is a place that arose relatively recently. It is currently the seat of the diocesan vocation center of the diocese of Trieste and has been run since 24 June 2014 by Don Andrea Destradi who is also parish priest of the parish of the Muggia Cathedral.

== History ==
Before the destruction of the town, the parish of Muggia Vecchia was very important and was officiated by a chapter of canons. Some elements of the current church date back to the 11th century, the rest of the building was rebuilt in the 13th century, the same period as the bell tower. The building was restored between 1950 and 1951. The basilica of Muggia Vecchia became a parish church in 1982.

== Description ==
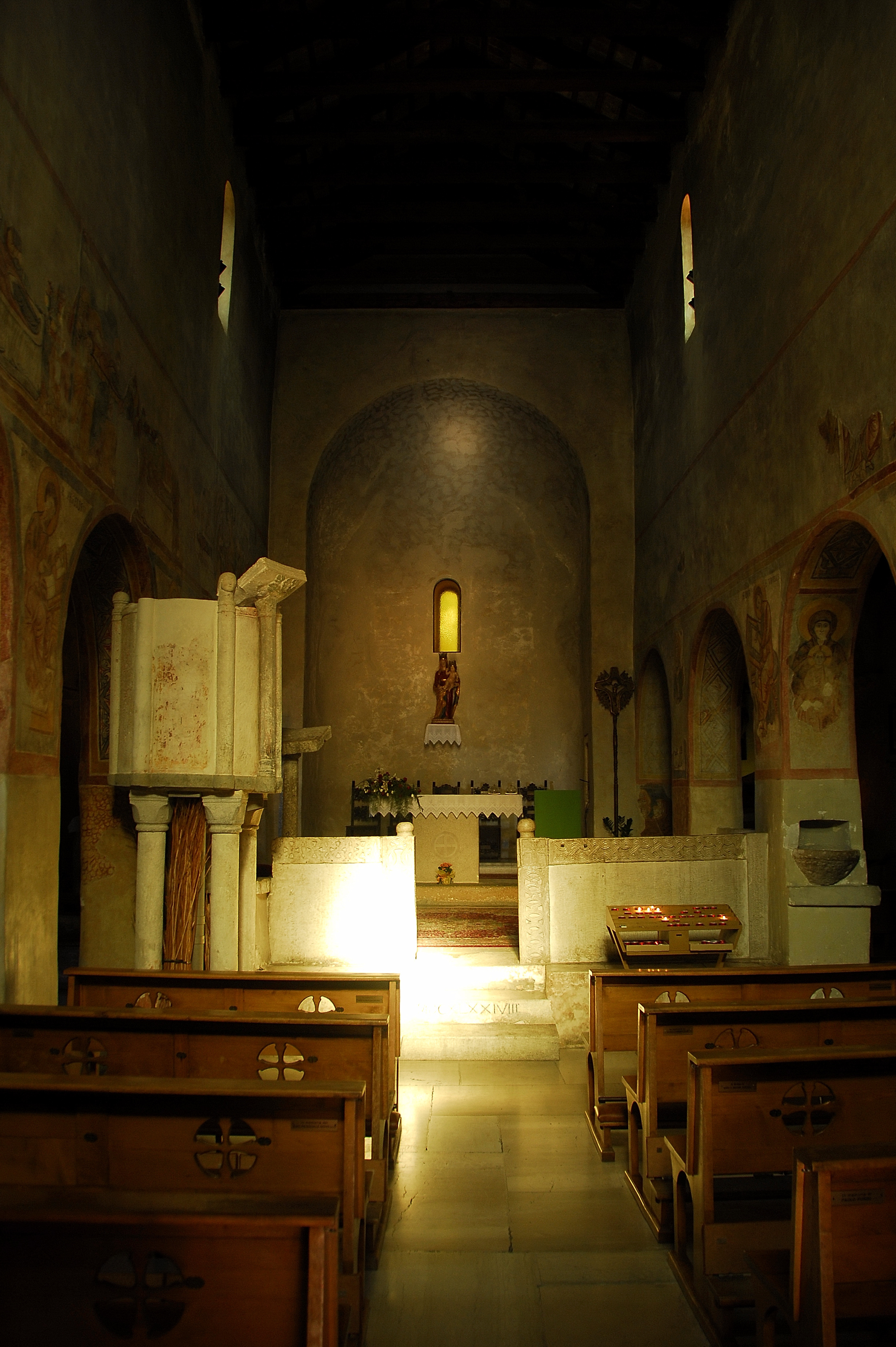
The interior of the basilica

The basilica, which measures 12.25 × 18.30 metres, has a "facciata a salienti" with a small bell gable.

The interior is divided into three naves. From the original structure remain the ambon, the lectern and two large and wide marble transennas or pluteus-shaped marble balustrades of Lombard art, datable to the Lombard period of King Liutprand (8th century) or in any case to the period of the Liutprandean Renaissance, 8th–9th century. Inside the basilica there are frescoes from the 13th to 15th centuries.
