= Giovanni Cattai =

Italian footballer

Personal information
- Date of birth: 1 January 1945 (age 81)
- Place of birth: Muggia, Italy
- Height: 1.76 m (5 ft 9 in)
- Position: Midfielder

Senior career*
Years	Team	Apps	(Gls)
1964–1965	Milan	0	(0)
1965–1966	→ Sambenedettese	24	(2)
1966–1967	→ Taranto	3	(0)
1967–1968	Piacenza	30	(4)
1968–1969	Varese	8	(0)
1969–1970	Venezia	19	(0)
1970–1971	→ Sottomarina	15	(0)
1971–1972	Venezia	8	(0)
1973–1974	Triestina	8	(0)
Total		115	(6)
- * Club domestic league appearances and goals

Giovanni Cattai (born 1 January 1945) is an Italian former footballer who played as a midfielder.

== Biography ==
He was born in Muggia, near Trieste, Italy.

After his debut in the Muggesana team from his native town, he joined A.C. Milan in 1960. He played at all youth stages with the Rossoneri, failing, however, to make his debut in the first team: in the 1964–65 season he was in fact in the first team squad, but he never played due to not having reached an economic agreement with the then general manager Gipo Viani. He played many friendlies with Milan.

He then went on loan first to Sambenedettese, with whom he collected 24 appearances and scored 3 goals in the 1965–1966 Serie C championship, and then to Taranto, still in Serie C. In his experience at Taranto he collected 3 appearances, and in the summer of 1967 was sold by Milan to Piacenza, first on loan and then permanently. In the team coached first by Sandro Puppo and then by Leo Zavatti he established himself as a starter in the role of midfielder, alongside Paolo Pestrin, totaling 27 appearances and scoring 3 goals in the 1967-1968 championship, which Piacenza finished in second place.

In the following season, with the arrival of new manager Tino Molina, he was excluded from the starting lineup; in October, after 3 appearances and one goal, he moved to Varese, in Serie A, in exchange for Giorgio Zoff. He made his debut in Serie A and with Varese on 24 November 1968, in a 1-1 draw against Palermo. He collected 6 caps in that season, which Varese finished in 14th place, just one point shy of 12th place, thus being relegated to the Serie B.

Reconfirmed for the following season, he collected a presence in Serie B with Varese before returning to Serie C with the jerseys of Venezia, Sottomarina and again Venezia. In the 1973-1974 Serie C he played with Triestina. He collected 8 caps in this season (without goals), in which Triestina was relegated to the Serie D.
