= Villi Bossi =

Italian sculptor (born 1939)

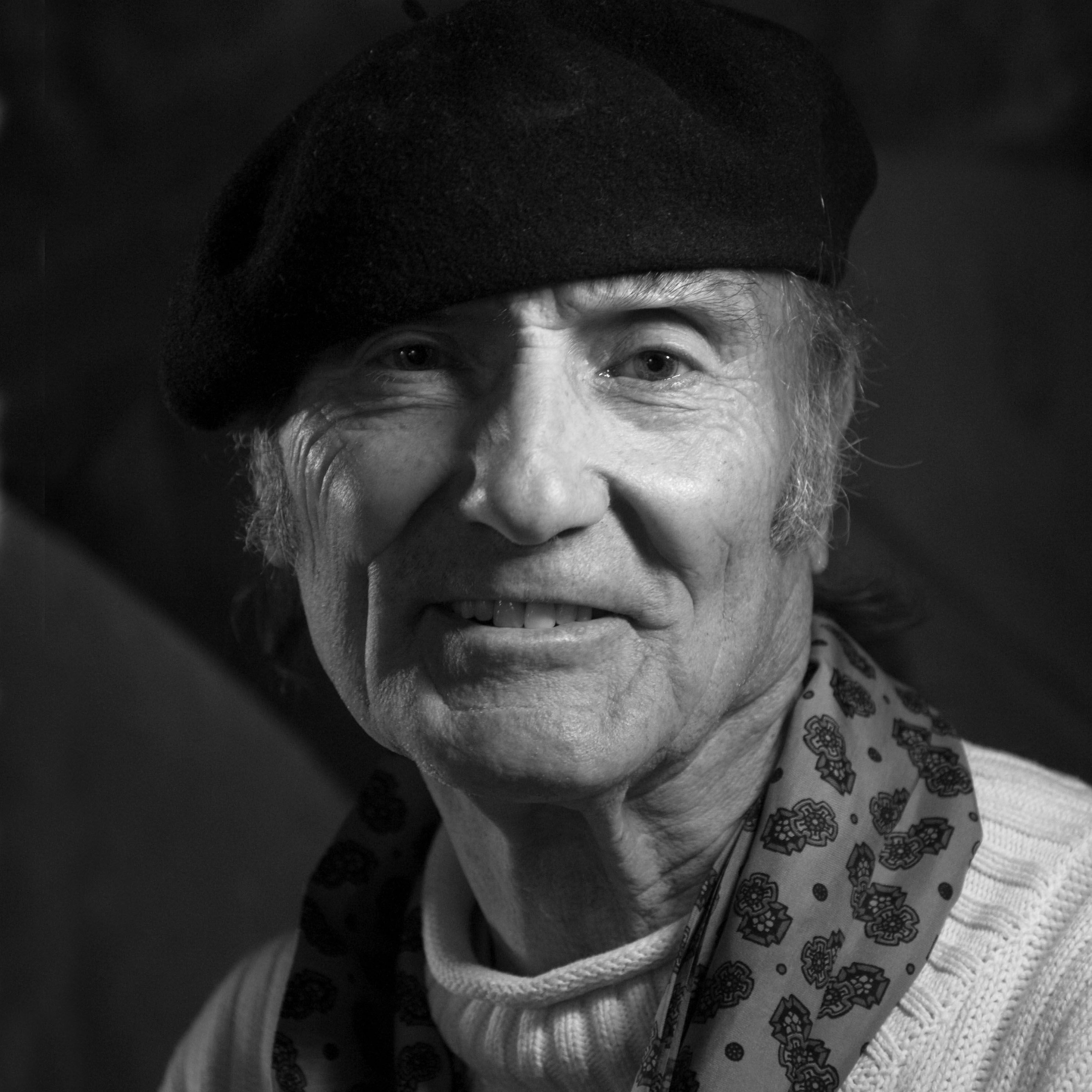
- Bossi in 2015
- Born: November 8, 1939 (age 86); Muggia, Italy
- Known for: Sculpture

Villi Bossi (born 8 November 1939) is an Italian sculptor.

== Biography ==
Born on 8 November 1939, in Muggia, he studied at the Academy of Fine Arts in Genoa under the scholarship of Lodovico Caraventa.

He attended the "Free School of Figure" directed by Nino Perizi at the Revoltella Museum in Trieste. From 1964, he held several exhibits, both exclusive ones and not, showing up his ability with various materials, including different types of wood and, in particular, sandstone and marble. In 1995, a large sculpture in Laas marble of his was placed in a park of Dresden (Germany).

In 2004, Villi Bossi sculpted a large "Venetian Lyon" for the Assicurazioni Generali, which is also the logo of this major insurance company, placed in the neighbourhood of Padua, starting from a large block of stone, sized 8 cubic meters. He took part to several International Symposia of Sculpture: Prilep (Macedonia, 1976, 1982), Lipica (Slovenia, 1980), Jockgrim (Germany, 1989), Kandel (Germany, 1993), Germersheim (Germany, 1997), Pirmasens (Germany, 1998), Portorose (Slovenia, 1999), Mostar (Bosnia and Herzegovina, 2006). Between 1964 and 2015, he held 35 personal exhibits in Austria and in various Italian cities. His work was reviewed by Giulio Montenero, Enzo Santese, Marianna Accerboni and Boris Petkovski, among others.

Bossi lives and works at the medieval Castle of Muggia.

== Selected works ==
- Friendship door (1978, in oak wood, 430 cm high, in Kostanievica na Krka, Slovenia)
- Lipica's horse (1980, in limestone, 100 by 150 by 230 cm, in Lipica, Slovenia)
- Life tracks (1987, in marble from Laas, 160 by 180 by 400 cm, in Dresden, Germany)
- Birth control (1989, in sandstone, 160 by 220 cm, in Jockgrim, Germany)
- Towards the Life (1995, in golden stone, 100 by 80 by 300 cm)
- Throne of Frederick II of Hohenstaufen (after 800 years of his birth) (1995, in marble of Garfagnana, 300 cm high, in Minucciano, Italy)
- Under the comet Hale-Bopp (1997, in sandstone, in Germersheim, Germany)
- River of tears over the History - Year 2000 (1998, in sandstone, 250 cm high, Park of Pirmasens, Germany)
- The year 2000 (1999, in stone of Vicenza, 200 cm high, Piazza del Simposio, Nanto Veneto, Italy).
- Song (2003, in wood of plane tree, 20 by 62 by 39 cm)
- A new birth (2003, in stone of Aurisina, 20 by 62 by 39 cm)
- Leave (2003, in stone of Aurisina, 76 by 80 by 48 cm)
- Sprout (2005, in marble of Aurisina, 130 by 150 by 190 cm)
- Cycle: New birth (2006, in wood of lime tree, 60 by 60 by 160 cm)
- Sentinel (2006, in stone of Istria, in Mostar (Herzegovina), 50 by 60 by 210 cm)
- Parallel Dialogue (2008, in stone of Aurisina, 28 by 65 by 130 cm)
- Fertility (2009, in stone of Aurisina, 35 by 50 by 48 cm)
- New freedom (2010, in stone of Repen, 25 by 25 by 87 cm)
- Flower (2011, in stone of Istria, 53 by 23 by 35 cm)
- Vortex (2012, in wood of cherry, 1040 by 30 by 30 cm)
- Petals (2012, in grey marble of Carnia, 45 by 60 by 20 cm)
- New birth (2012, in marble of Carrara, 30 by 30 by 70 cm)
- Fir seeds (2013, in marble of Carrara, 32 by 23 by 21 cm)
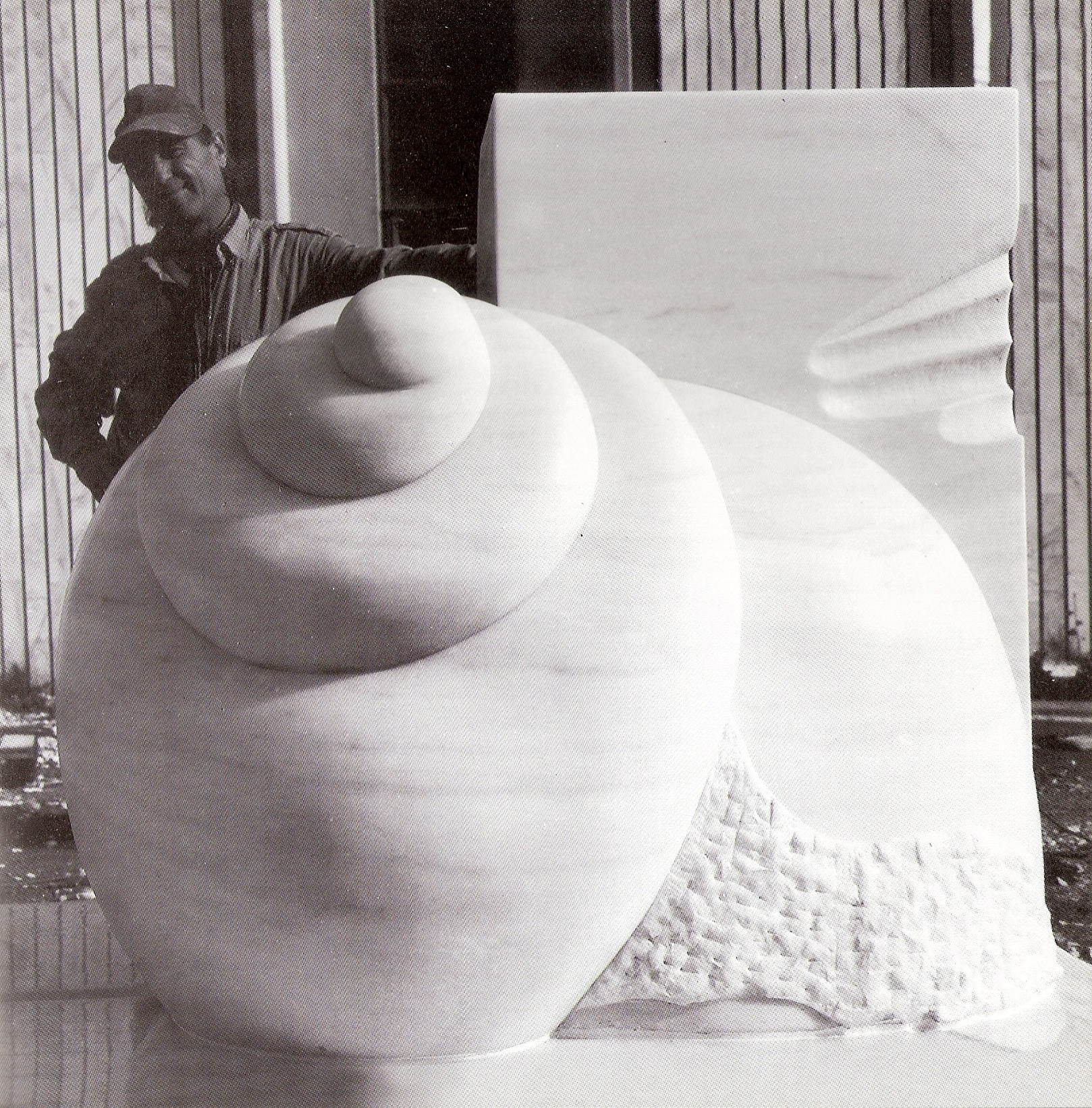
Life tracks (1987)

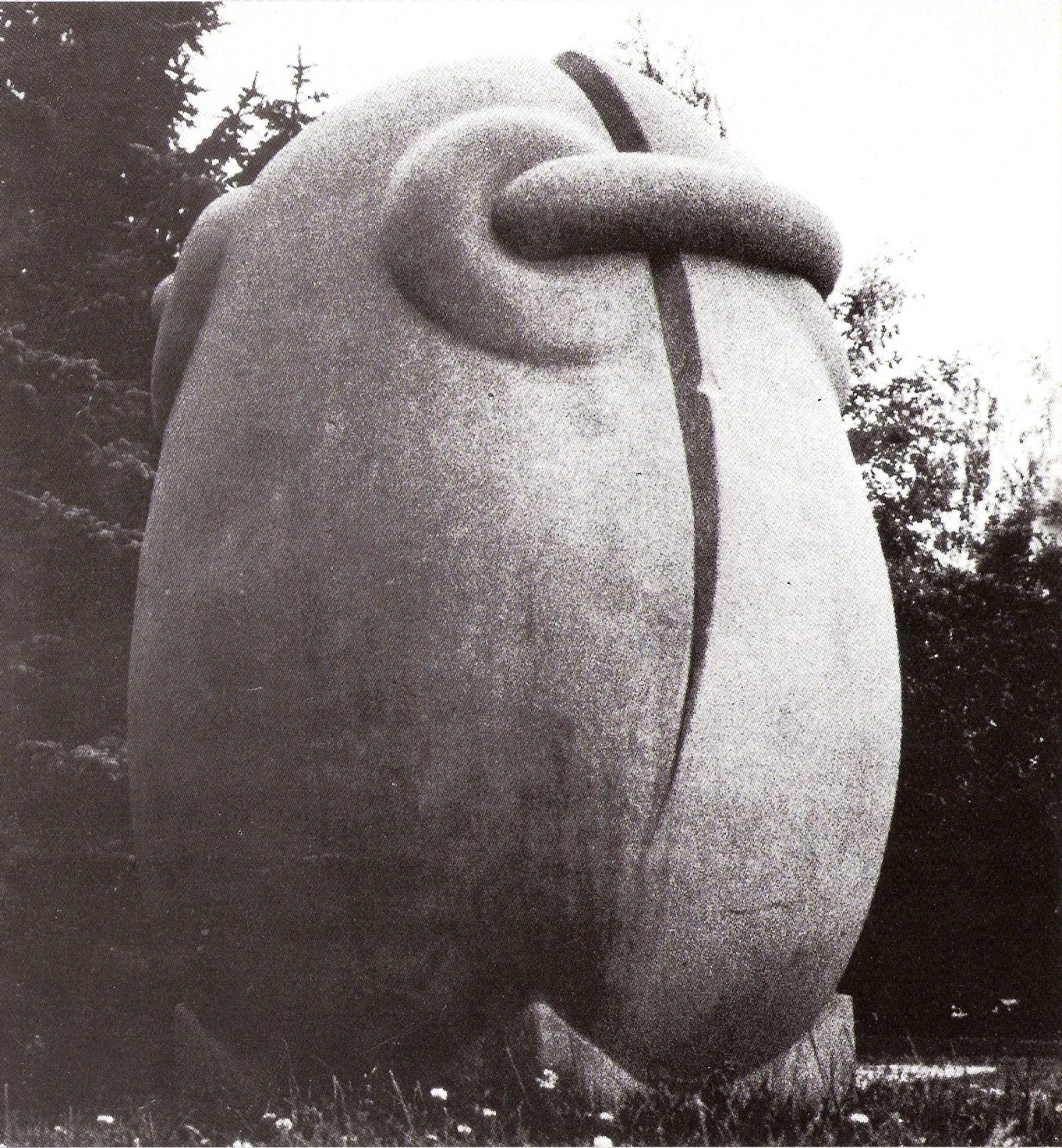
Birth control (1989)

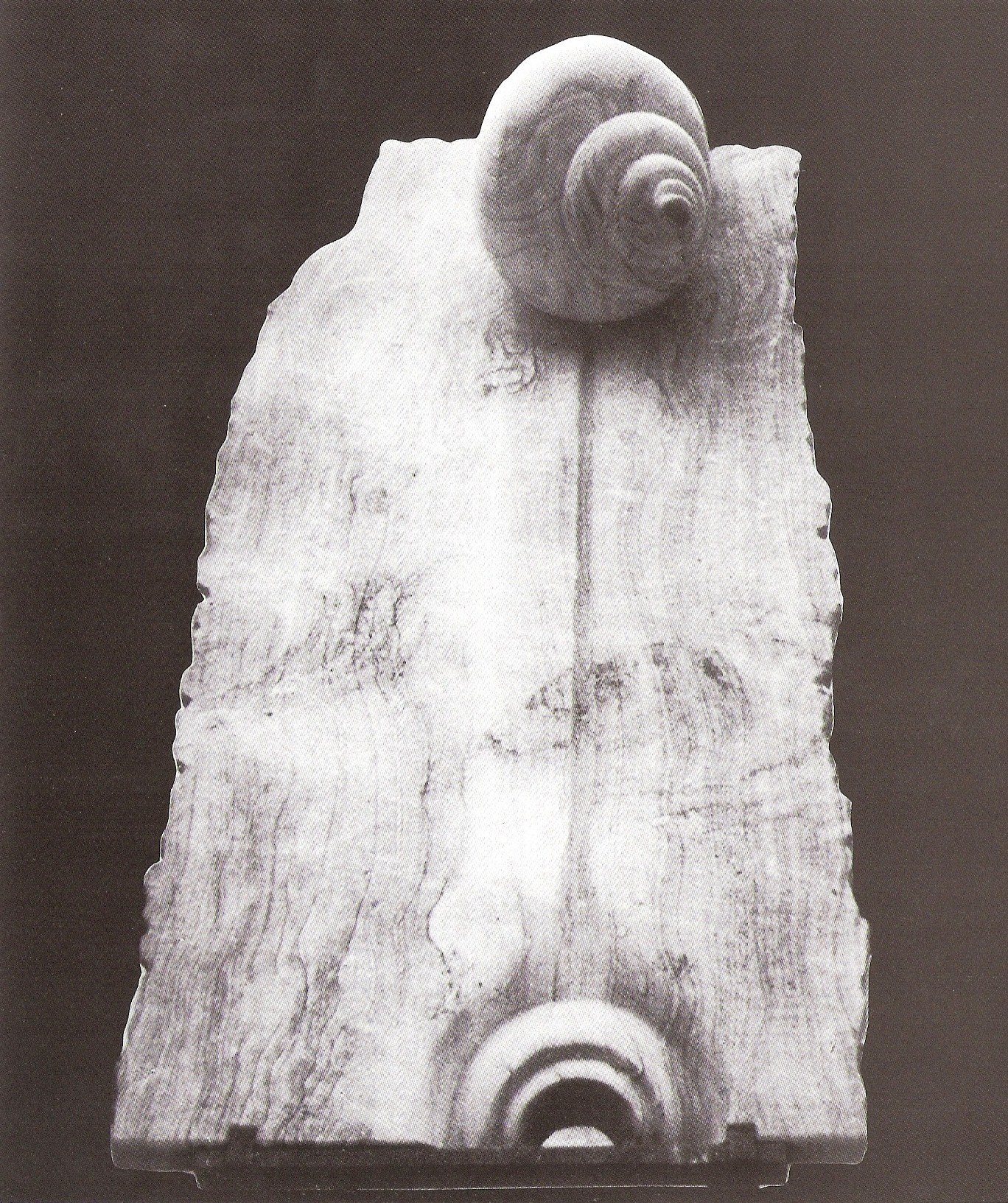
Towards the Life (1995)

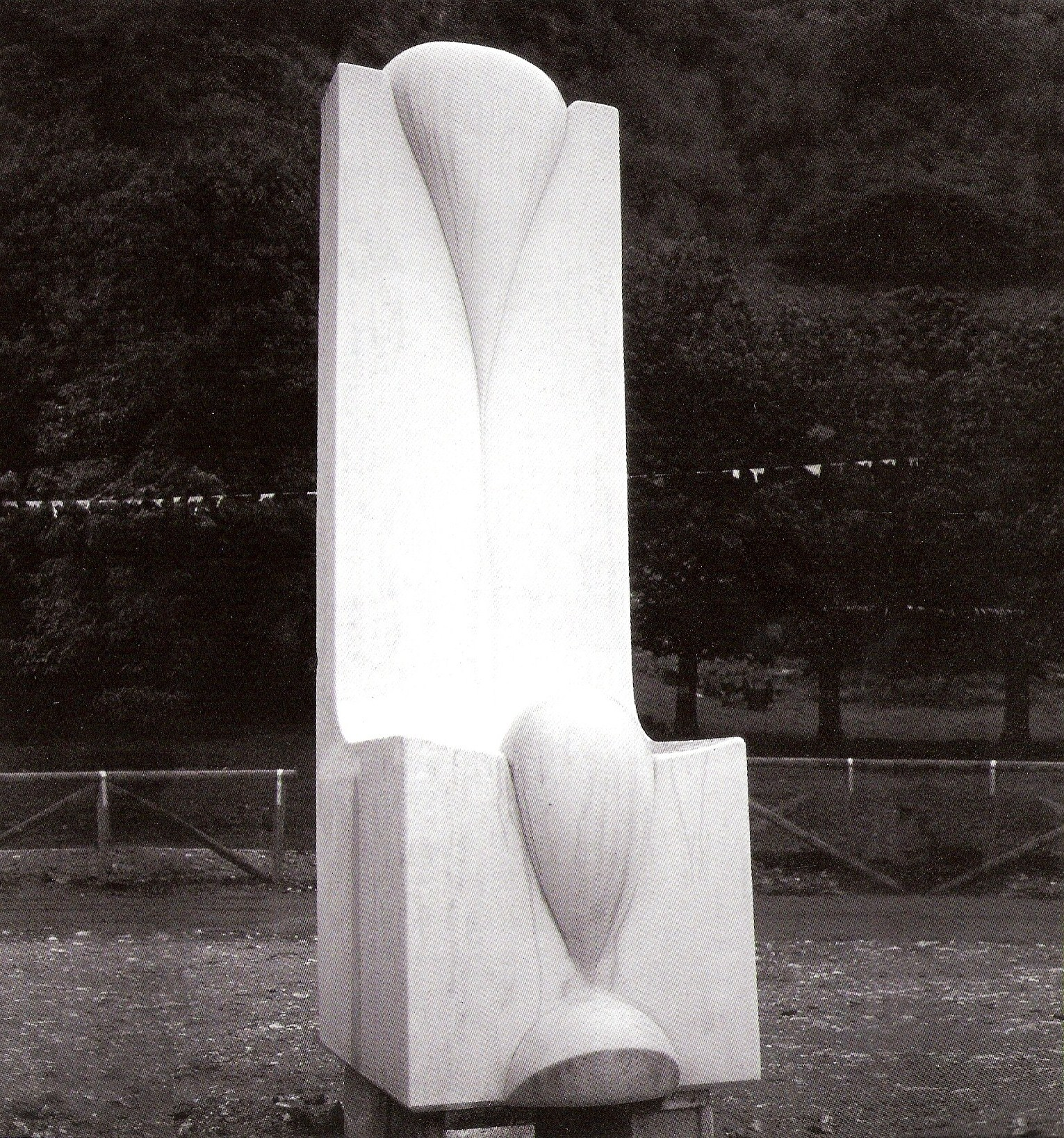
Throne of Frederick II (1995)

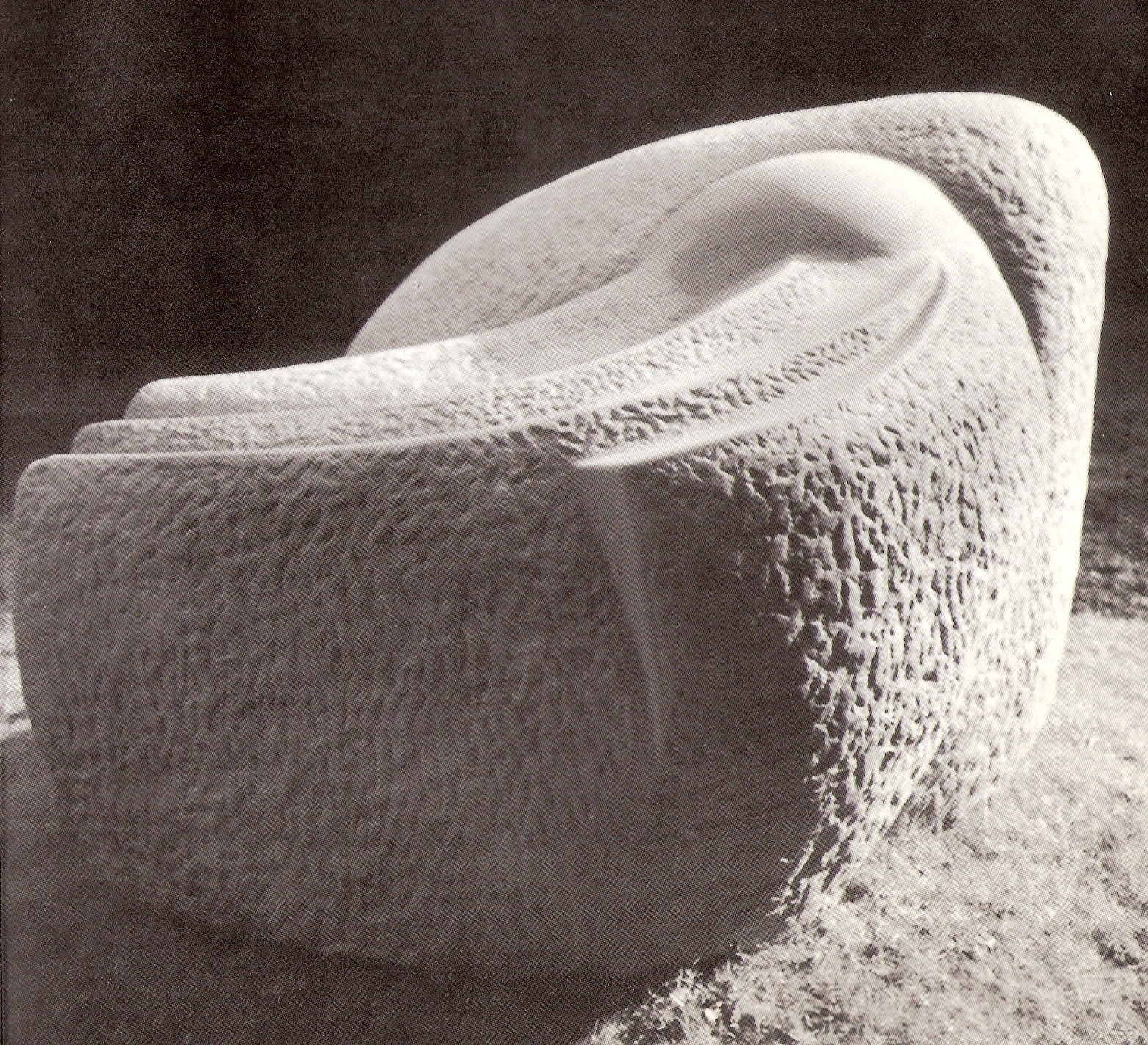
Under the comet Hale-Bopp (1997)

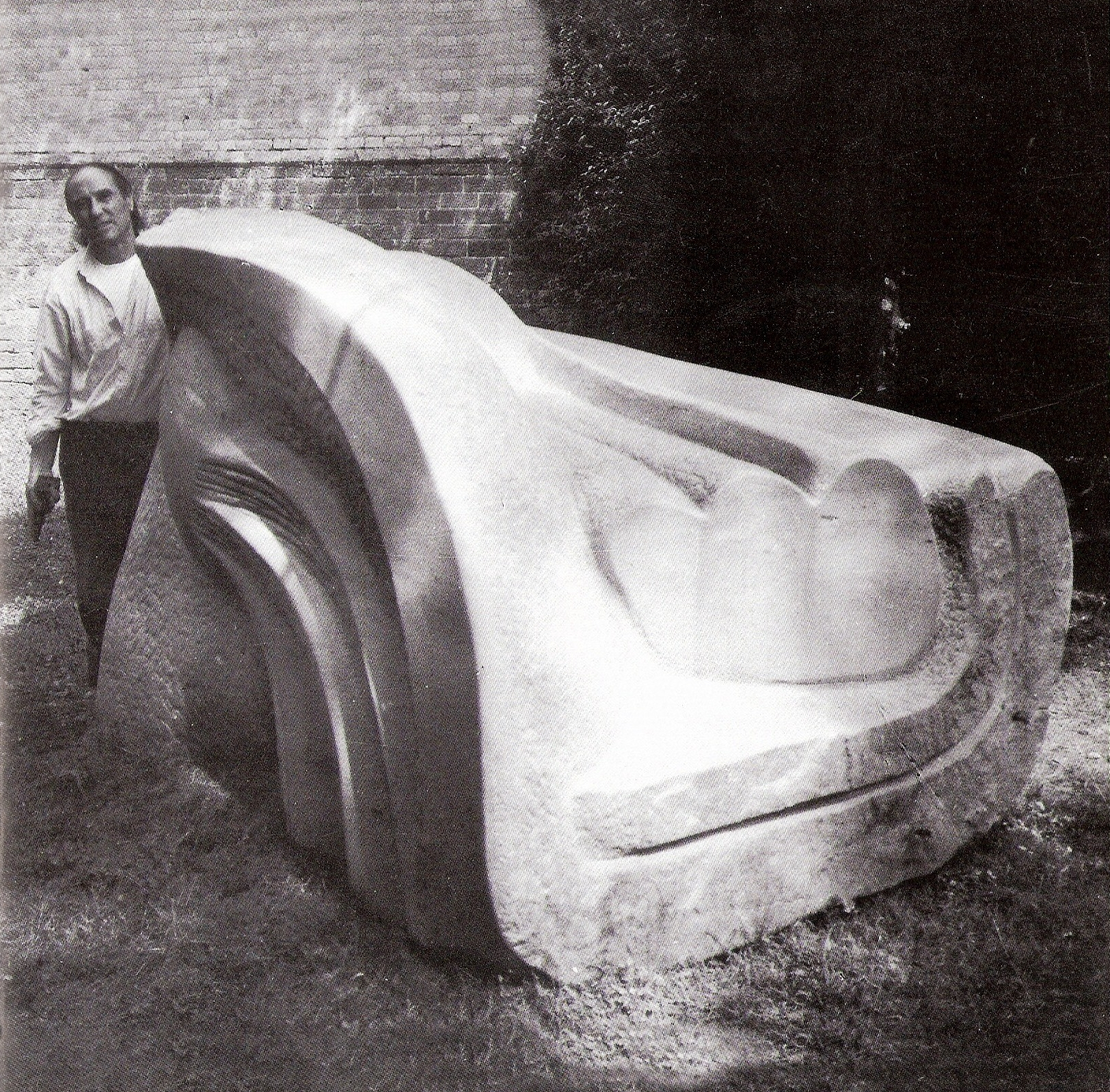
Under the comet Hale-Bopp (1997)

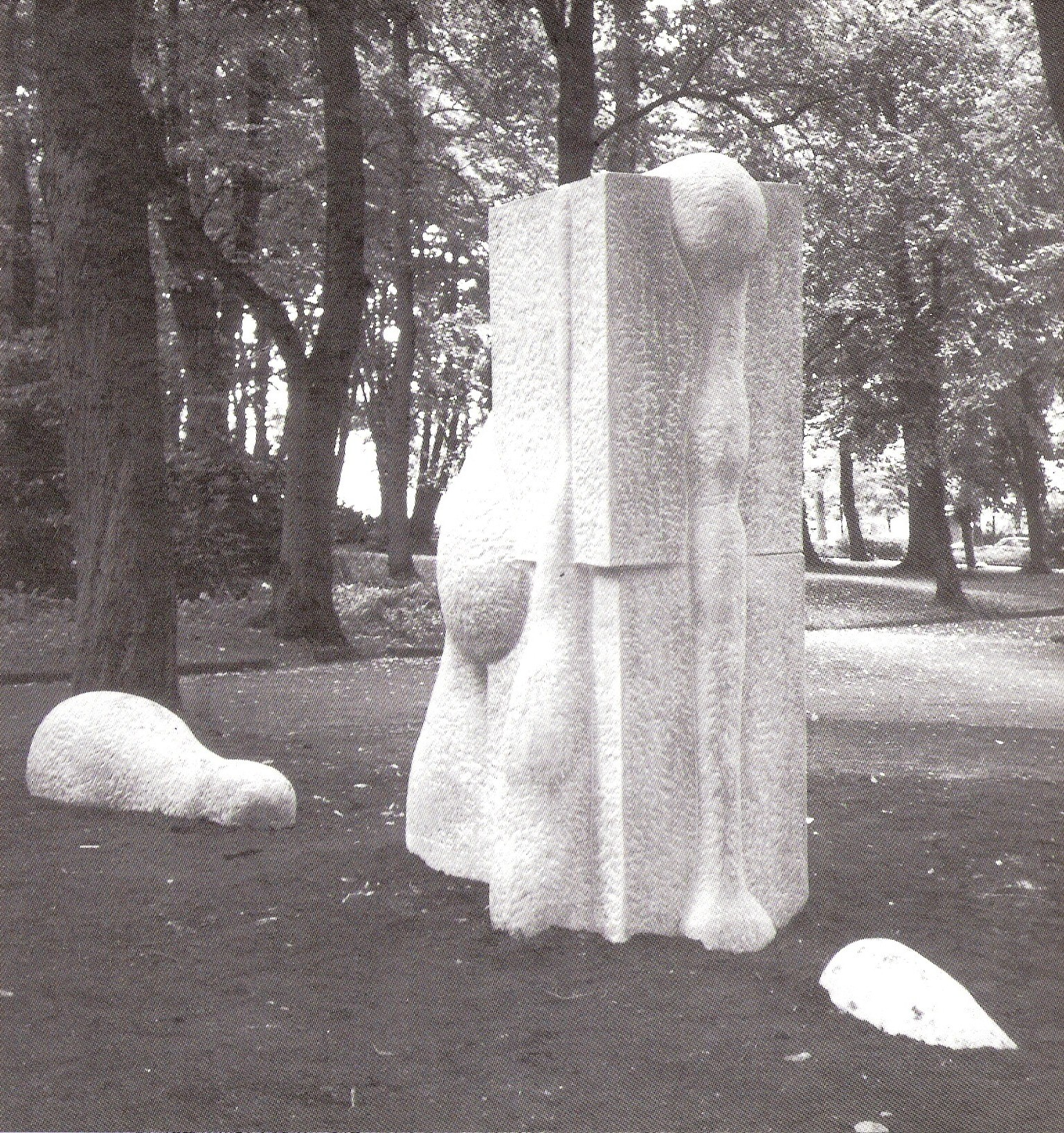
River of tears over the History (1998)

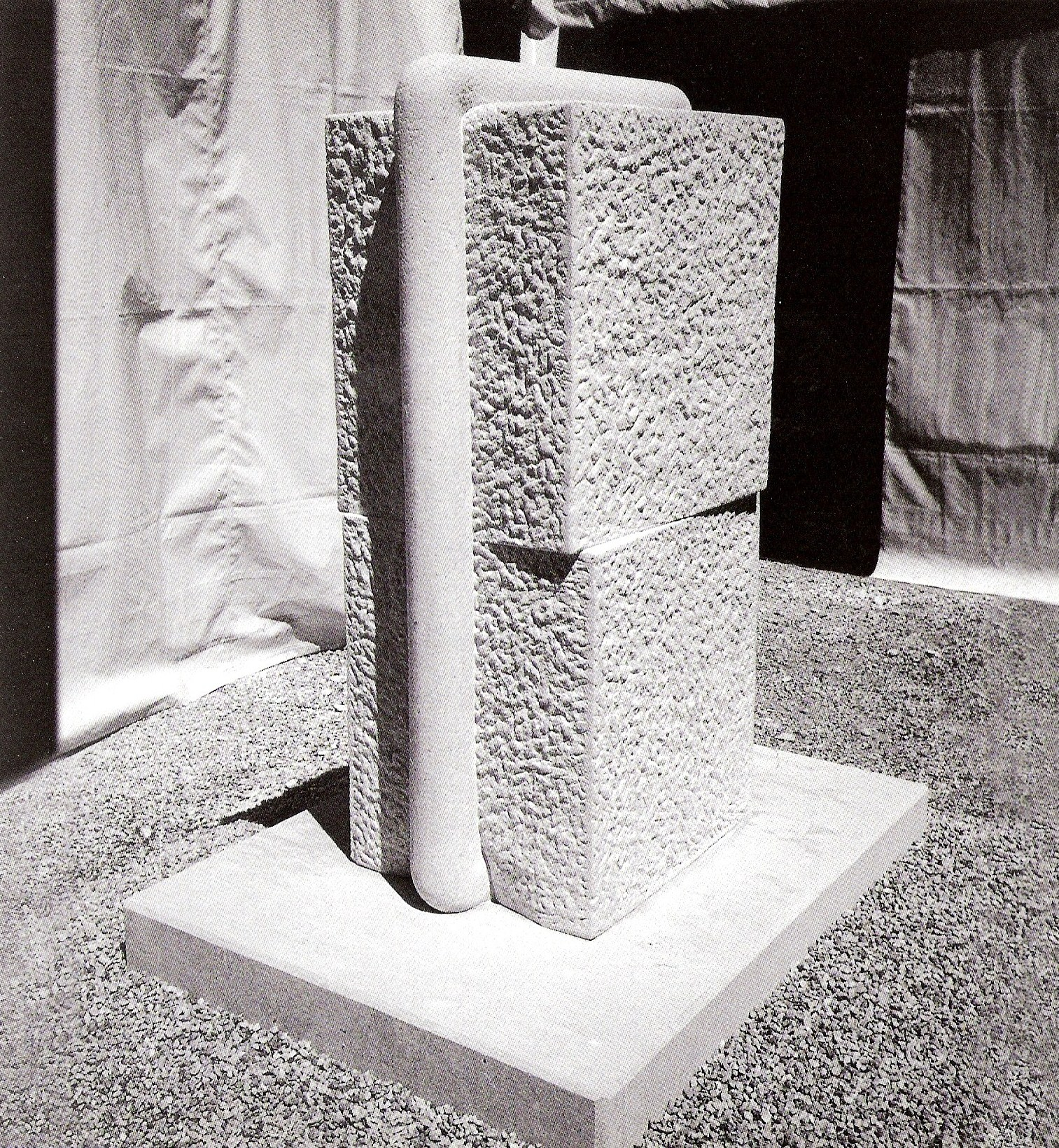
The year 2000 (1999)

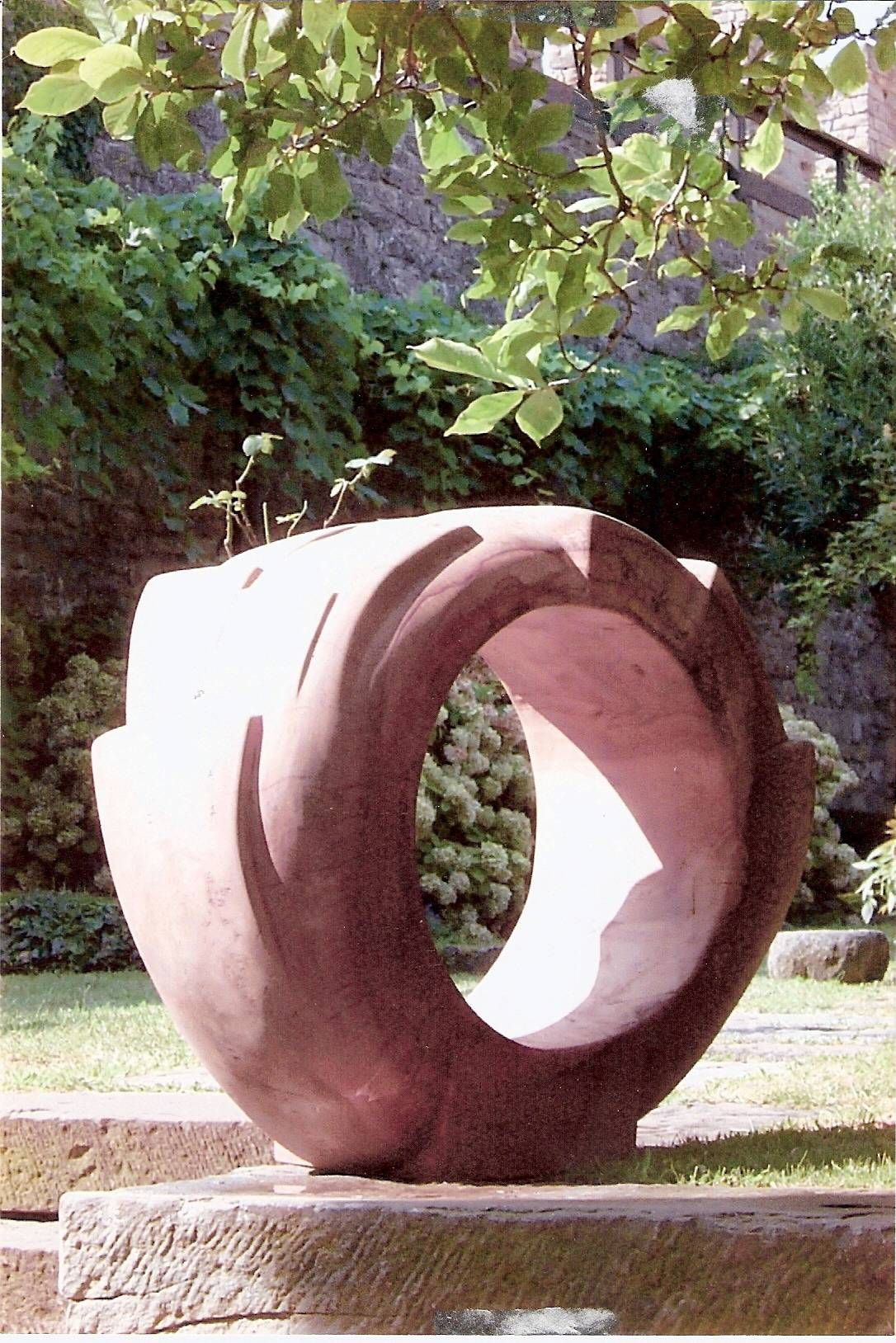
Song (2002)

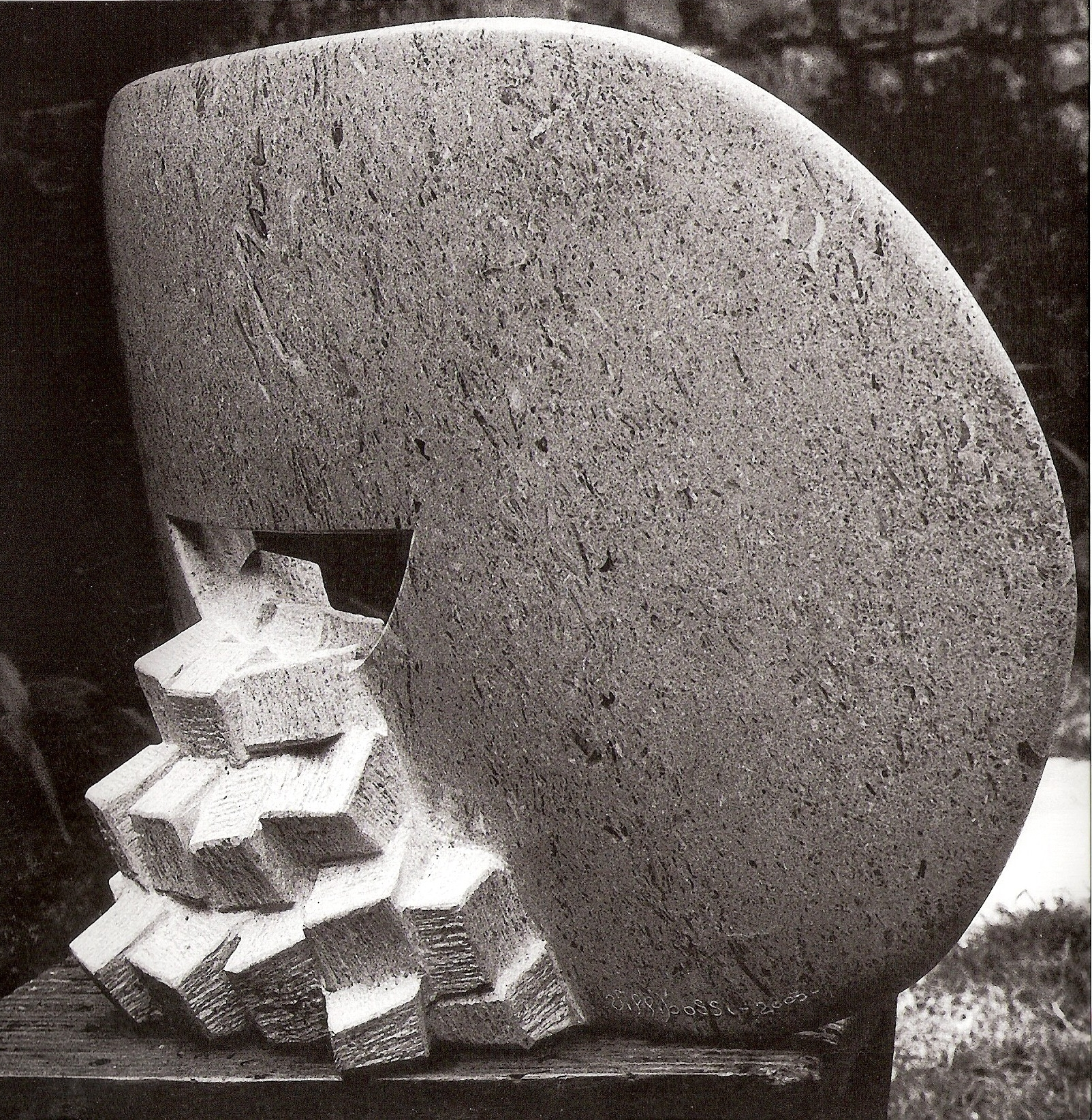
New birth (2003)

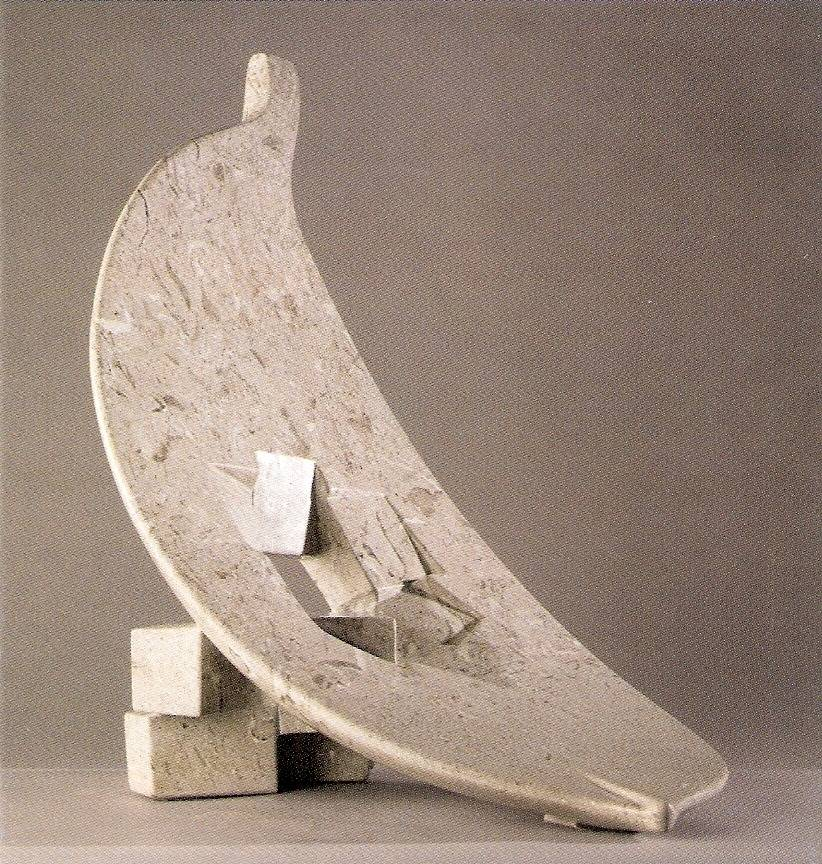
Leave (2003)

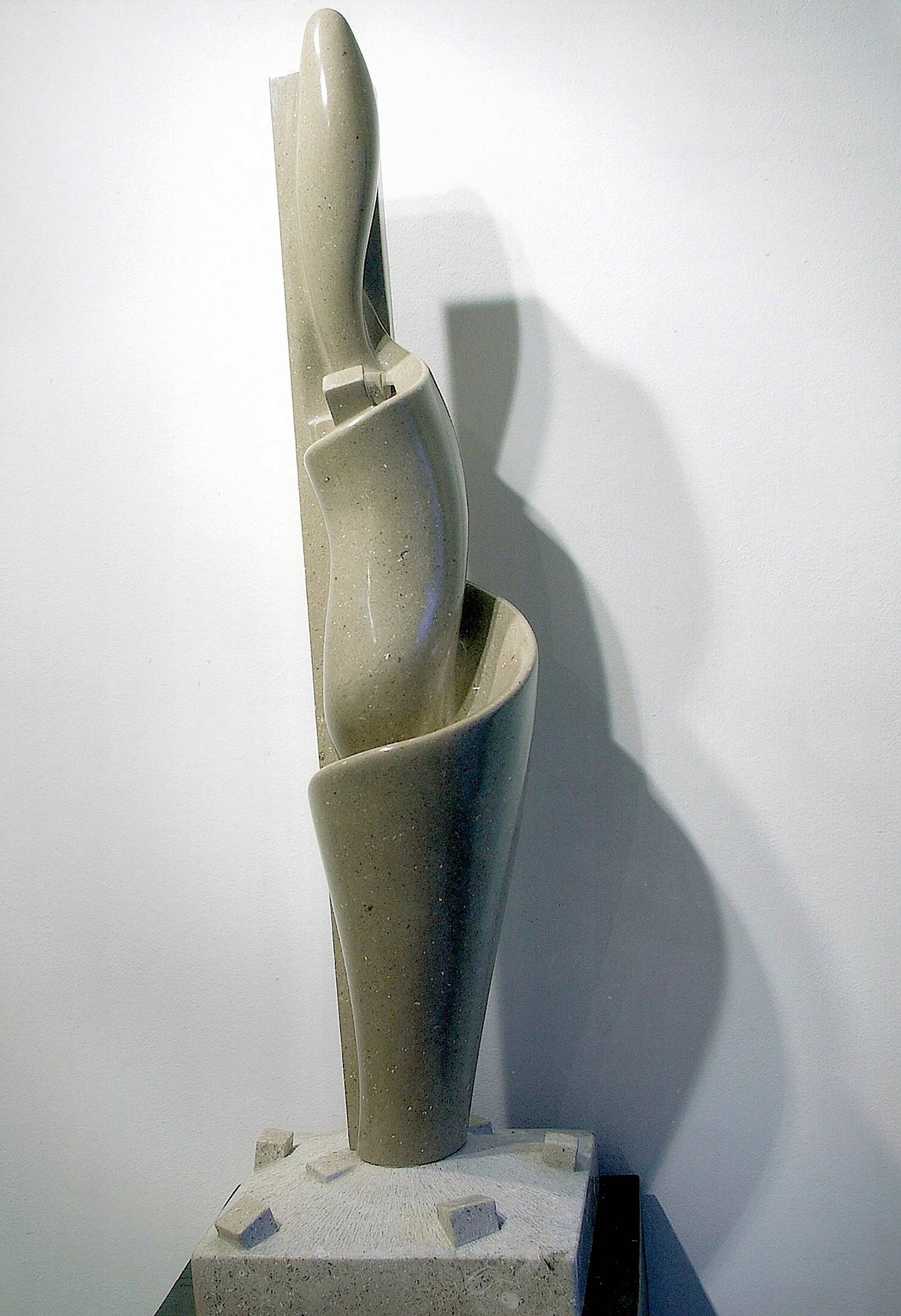
Sprout (2005)

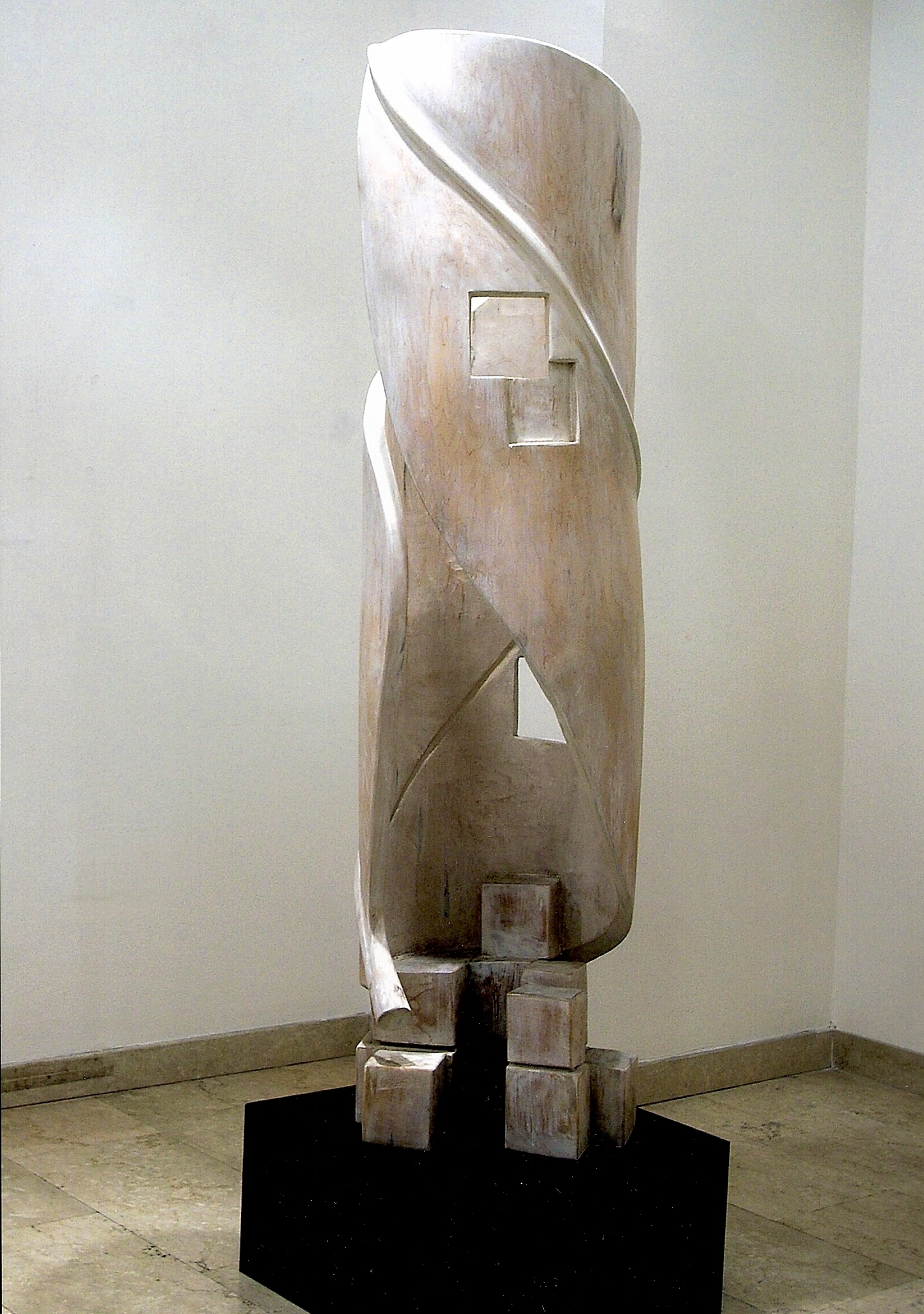
Cycle: New birth (2005)

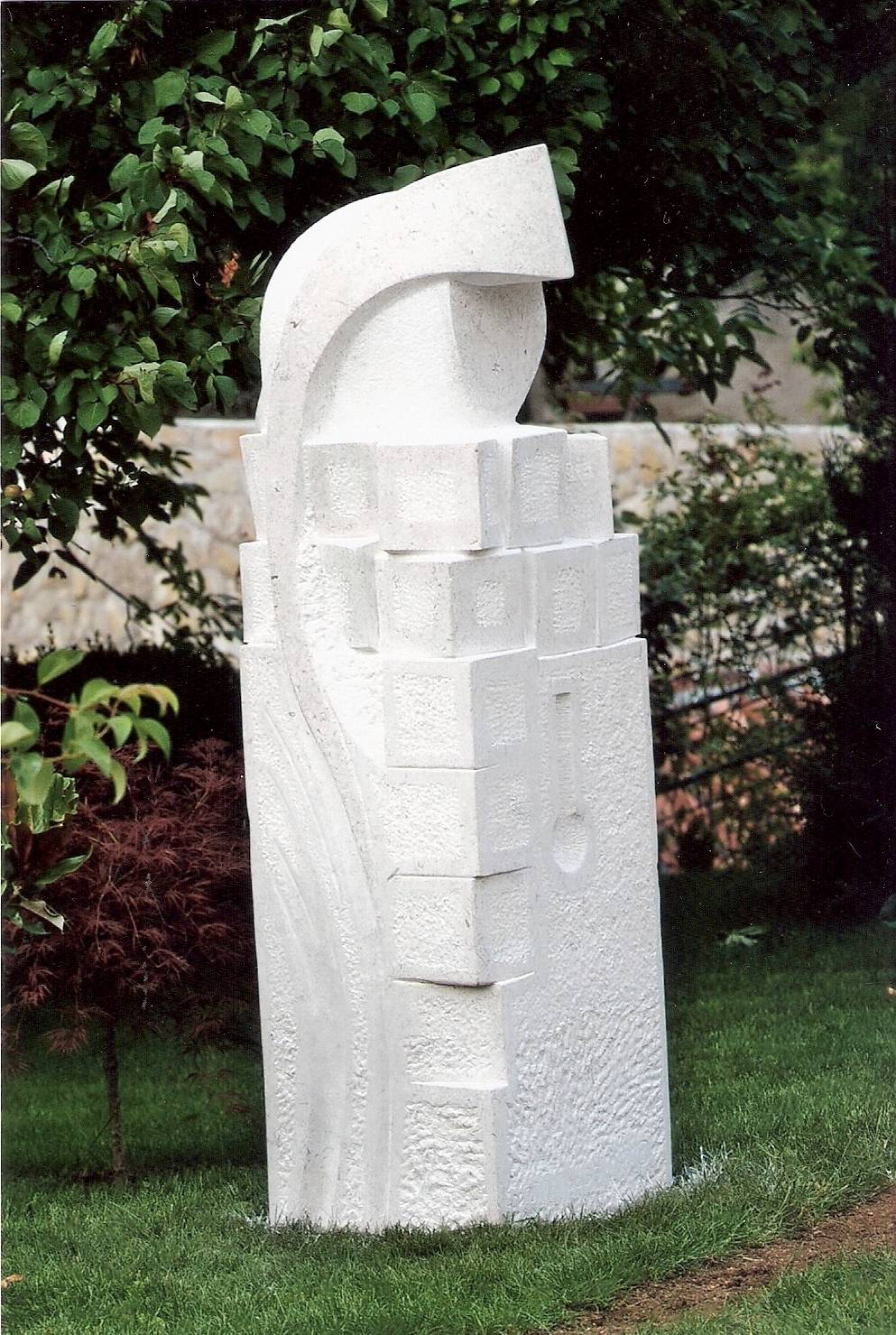
Sentinel (2006)

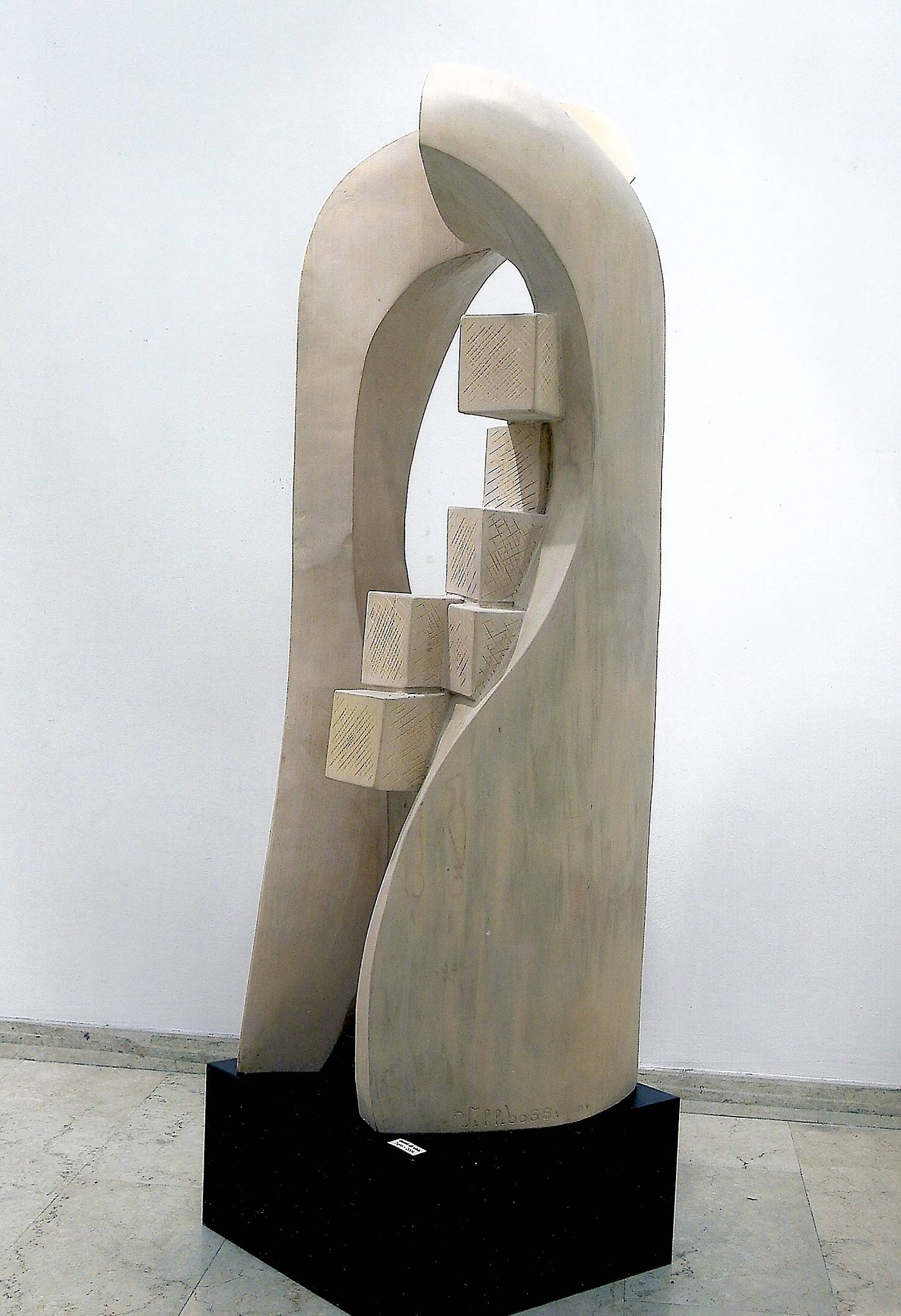
New birth (2006)

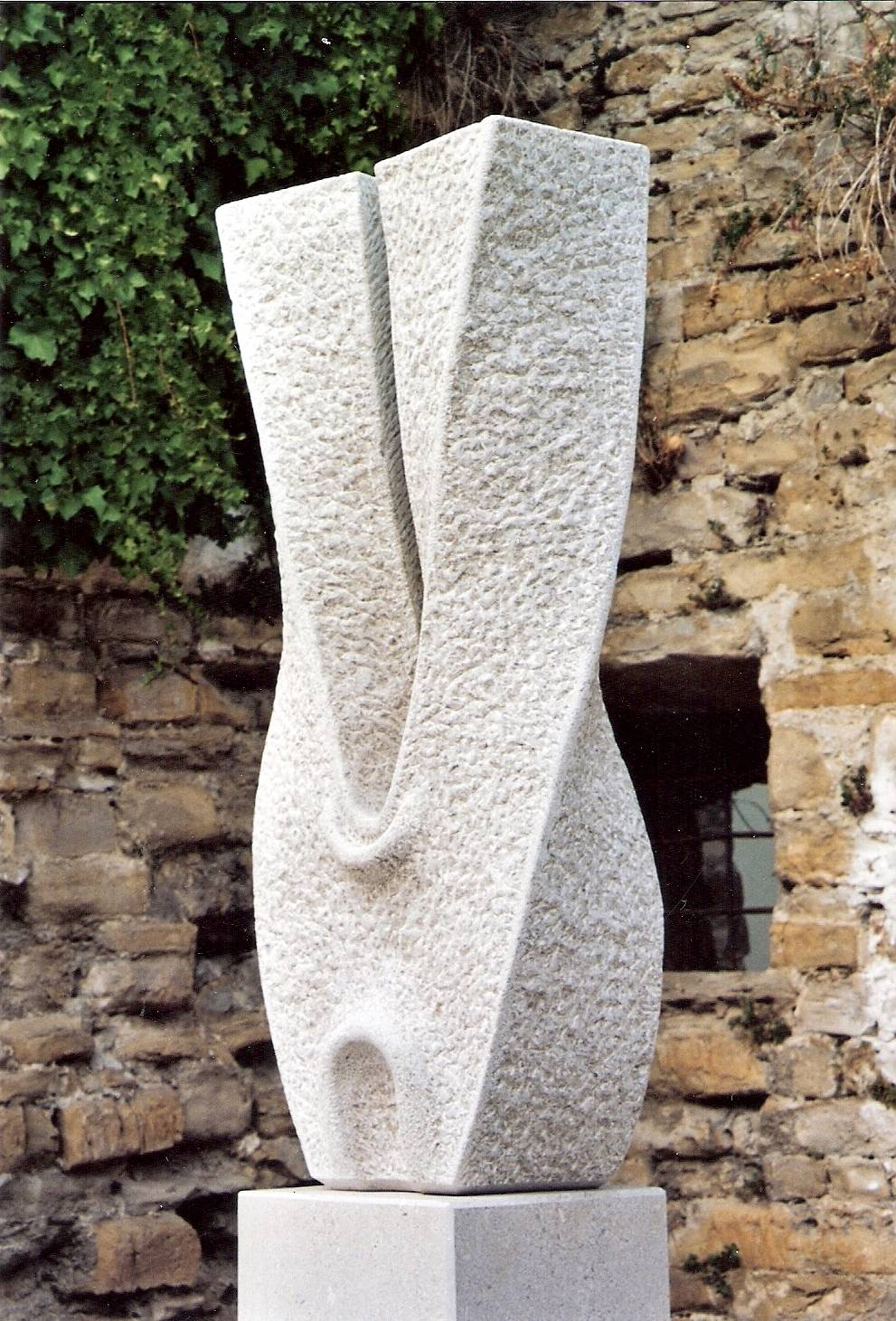
Parallel dialogue (2008)

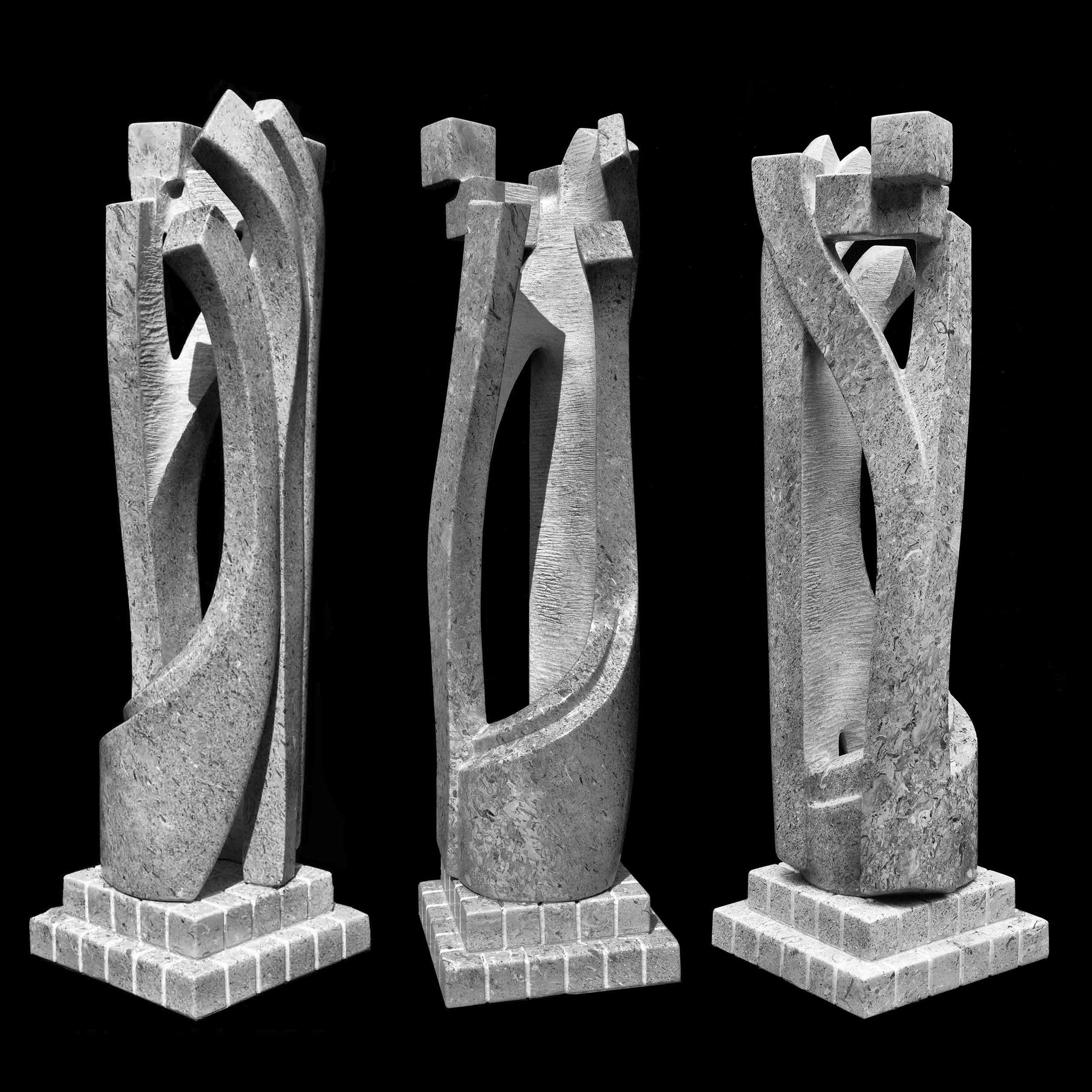
New freedom (2010)

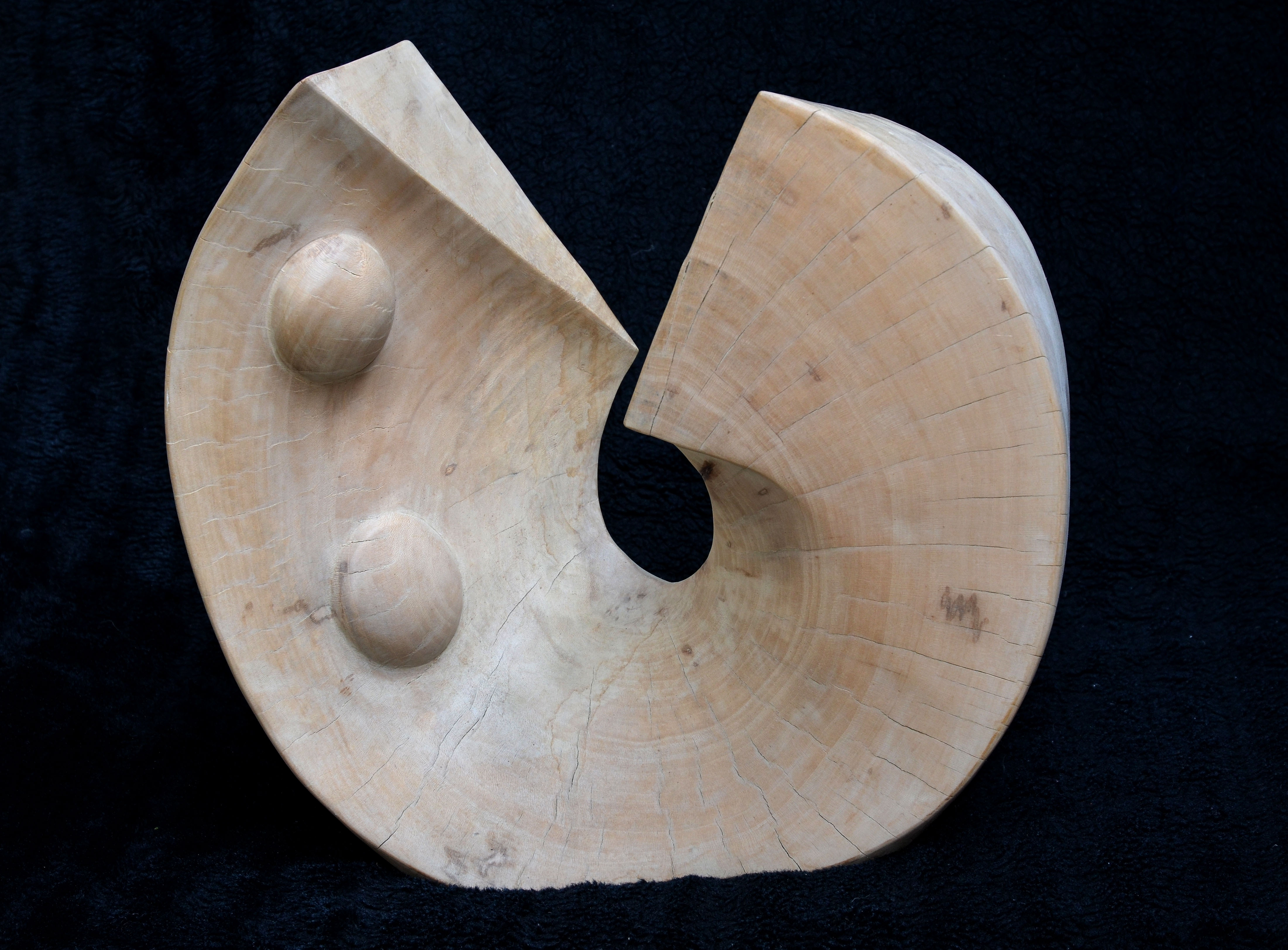
Fertility (2009)

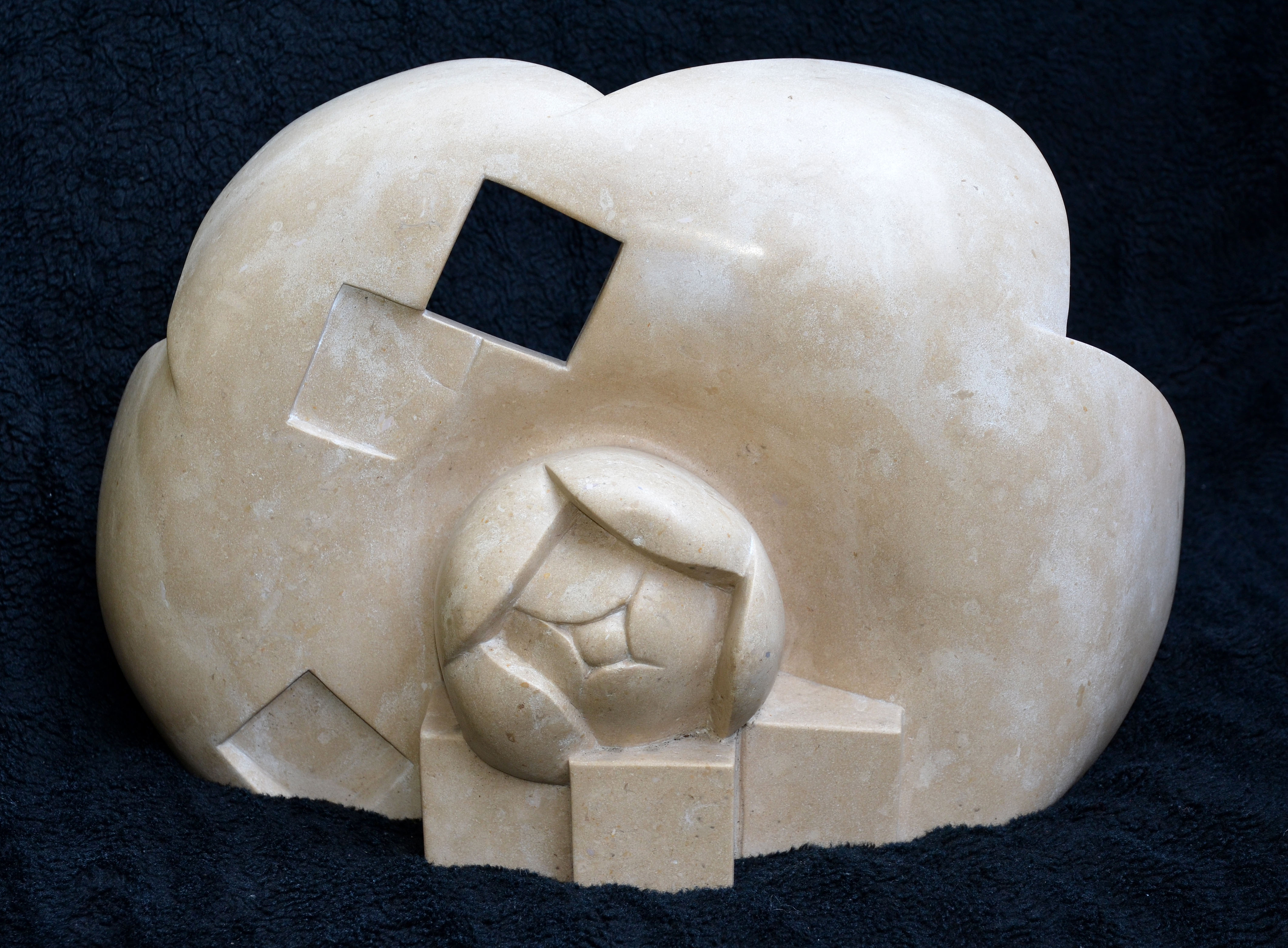
Flower (2011)

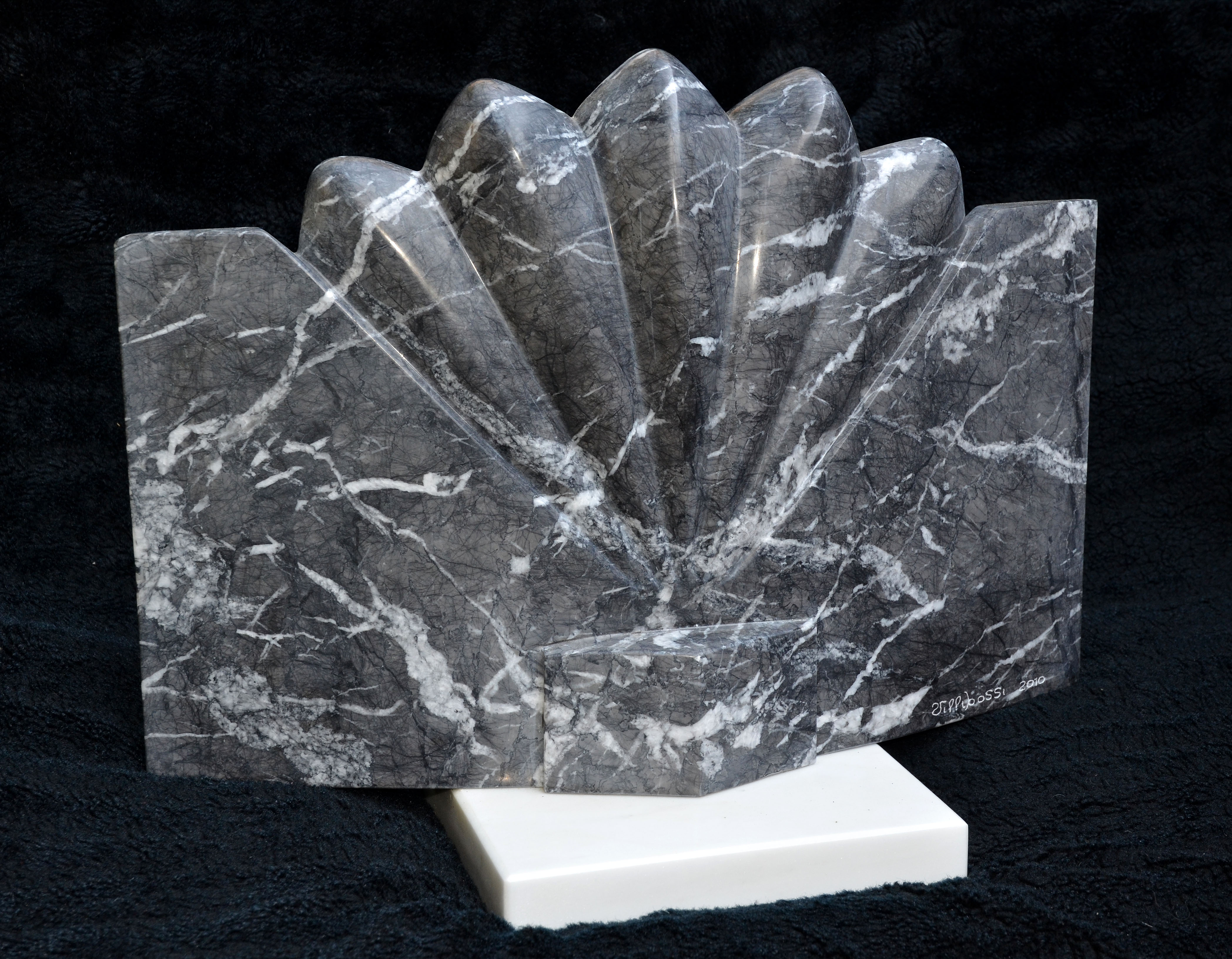
Petals (2012)

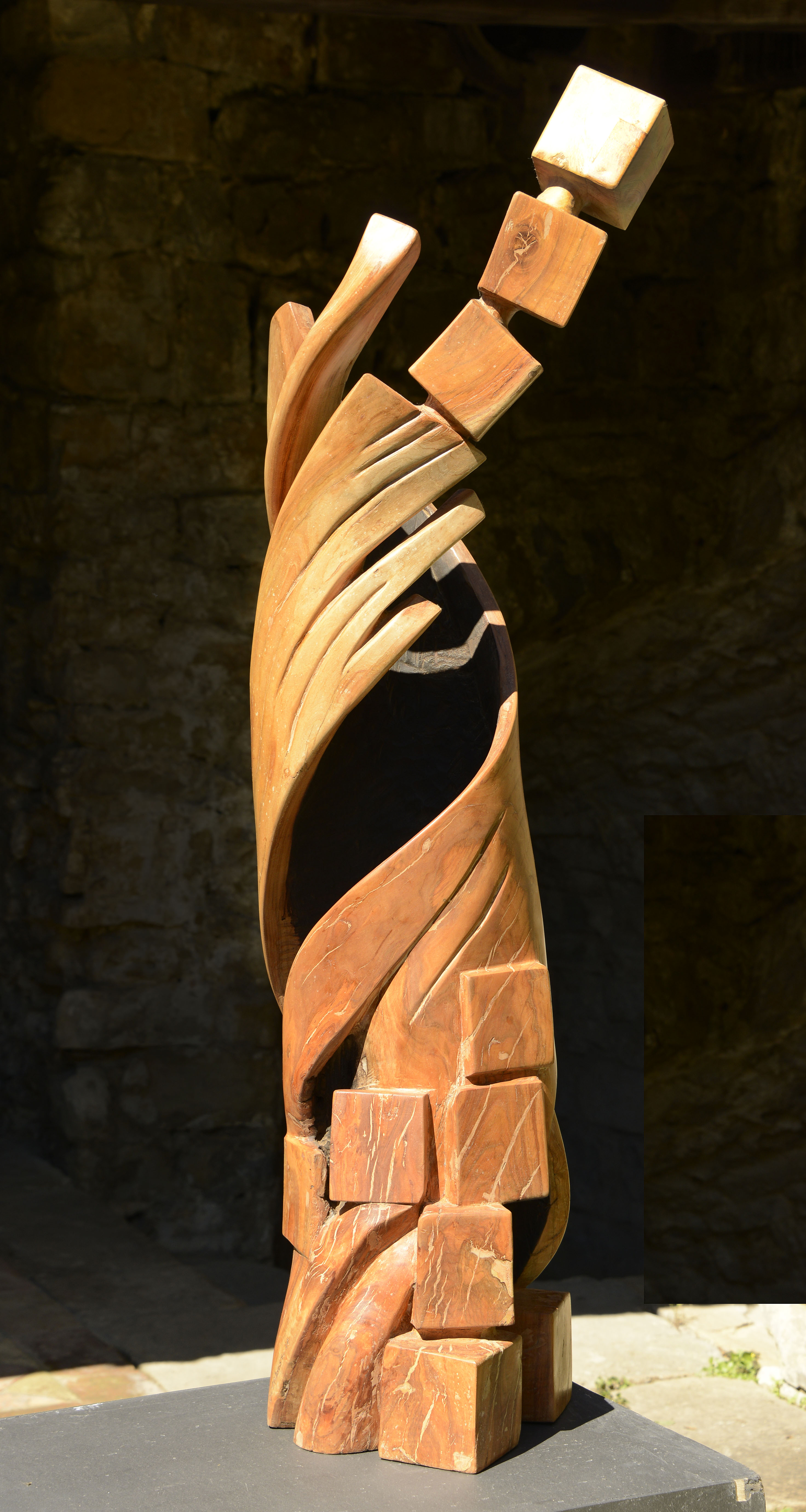
Vortex (2012)

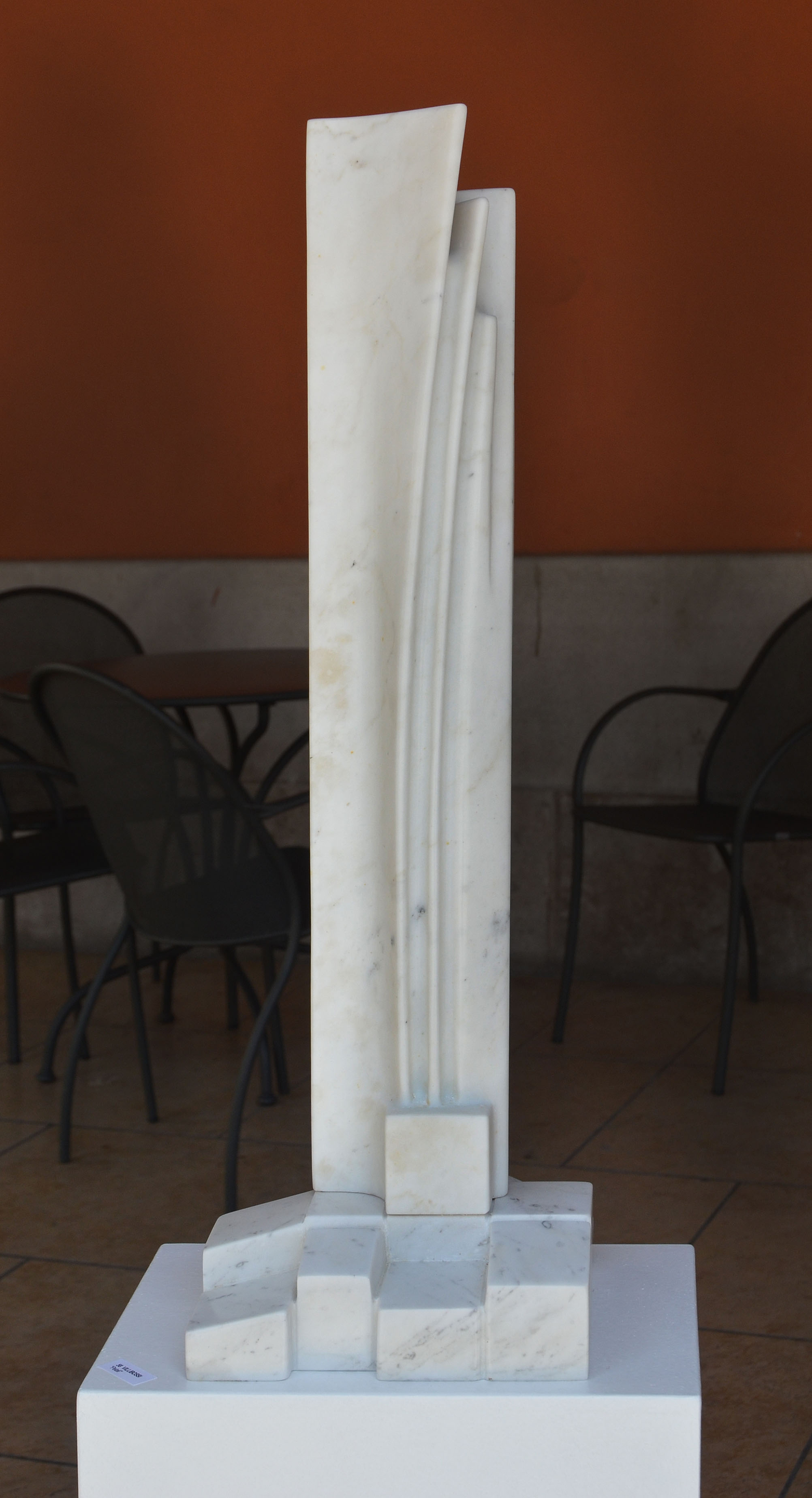
New birth (2012)

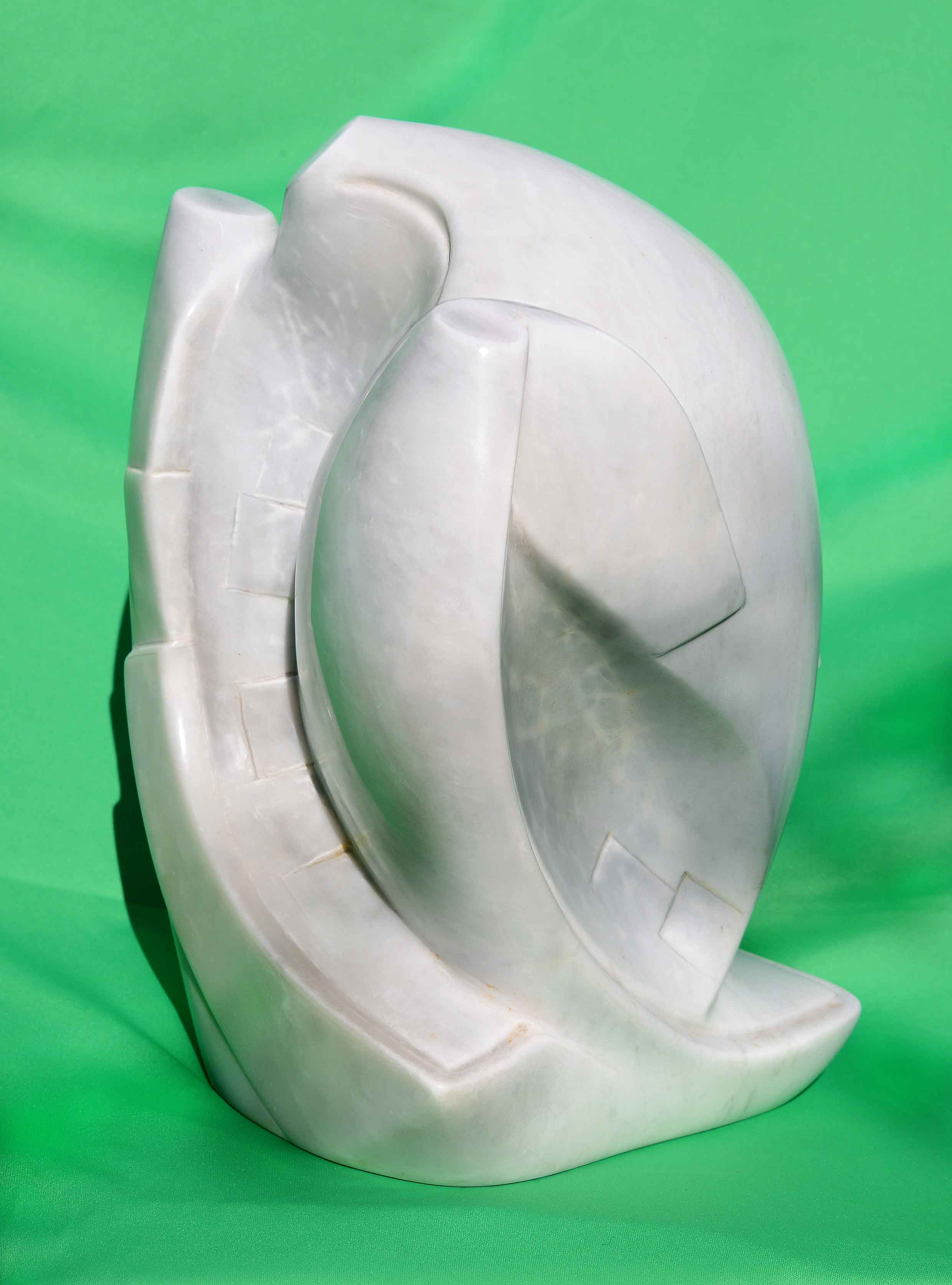
Fir seeds (2013)

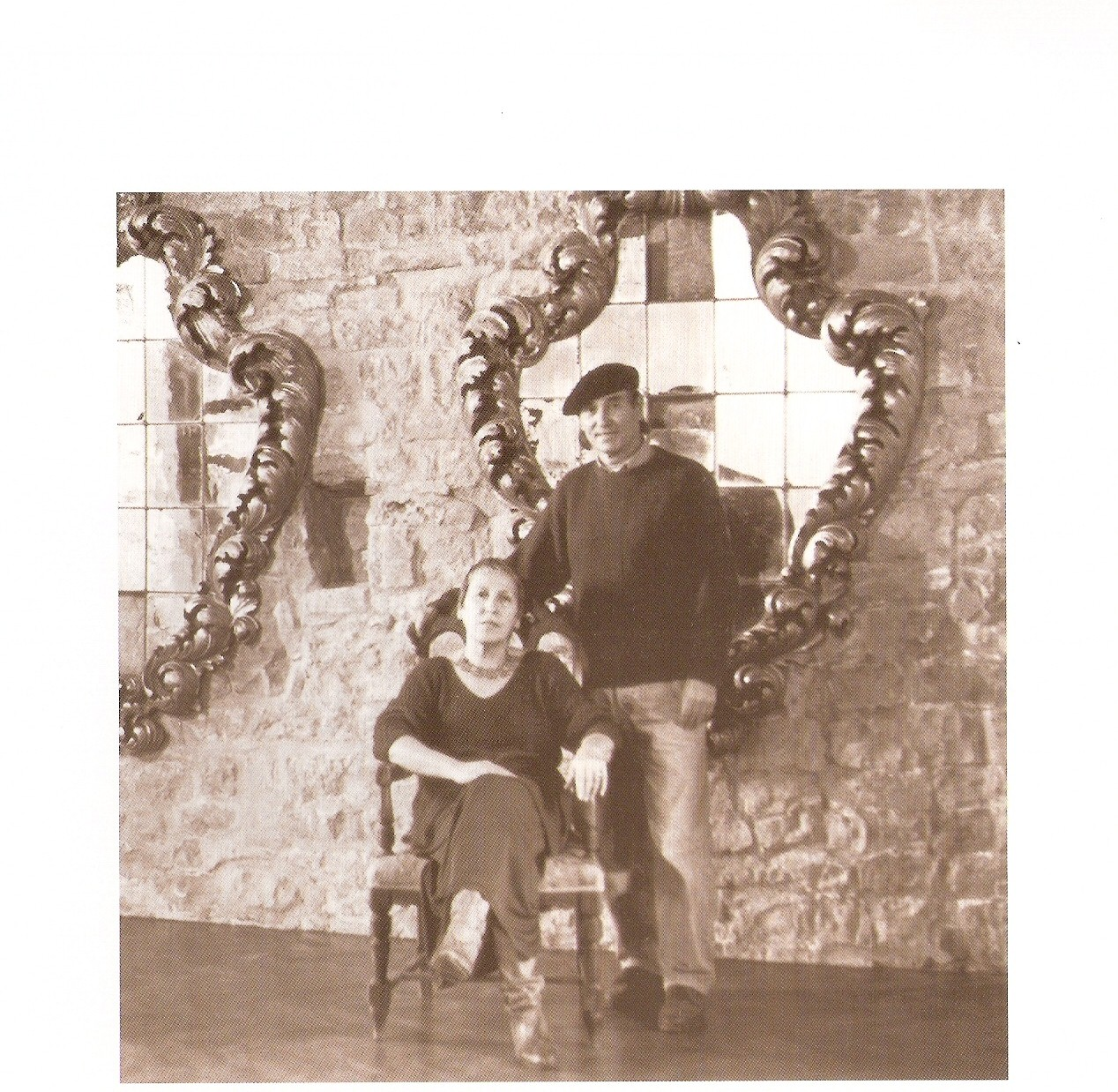
Villi Bossi and his wife Gabriella
