= Muggia =

Italian town and comune

- Comune
- Comune di Muggia; Občina Milje
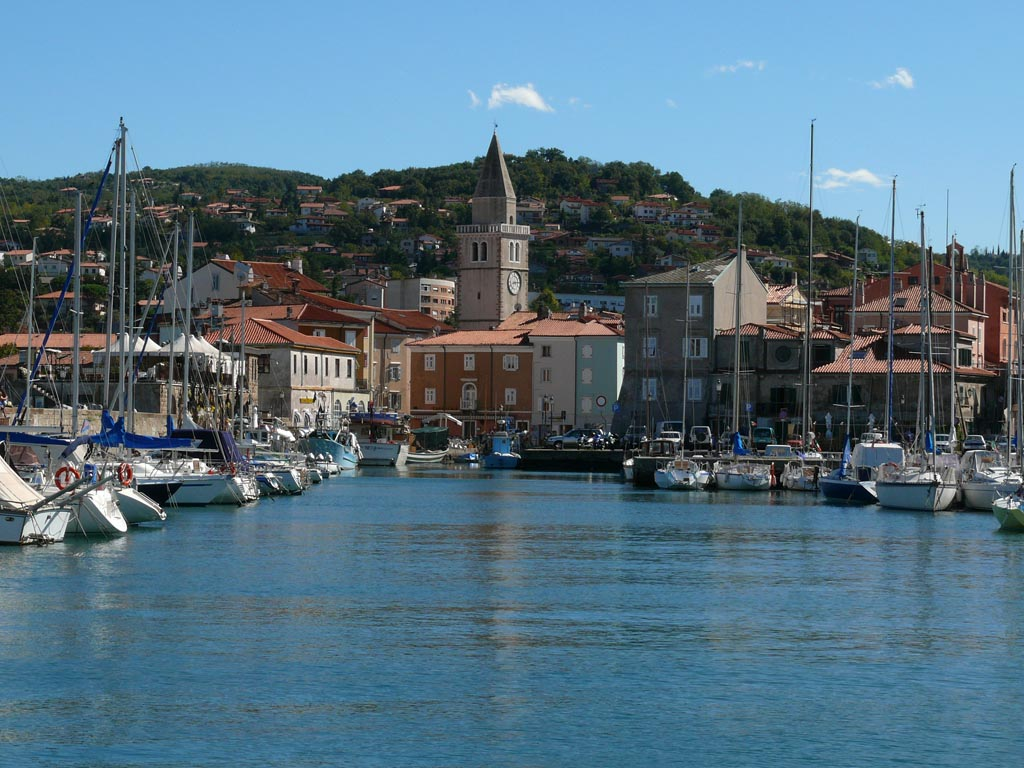
- Muggia in 2007

- Flag Coat of arms
- Interactive map of Muggia
- Location of Muggia in Friuli-Venezia Giulia Muggia (Italy)
- Coordinates: 45°36′N 13°46′E
- Country: Italy
- Region: Friuli-Venezia Giulia
- Province: Trieste (TS)
- Frazioni: Aquilinia (Žavlje), S. Barbara (Korošci), Chiampore (Čampore), Zindis, Lazzaretto-S. Bartolomeo (Lazaret - Sveti Jernej), Belpoggio (Beloglav)

Government
  - Mayor: Paolo Polidori (since 2021) (League)

Area
  - Total: 13.85 km^{2} (5.35 sq mi)
- Elevation: 3 m (9.8 ft)

Population (2025)
  - Total: 12,703
  - Density: 917.2/km^{2} (2,375/sq mi)
- Demonym(s): it. Muggesani sl. Miljčani
- Time zone: UTC+1 (CET)
  - Summer (DST): UTC+2 (CEST)
- Postal code: 34015
- Dialing code: 040
- Patron saint: Saints John and Paul
- Saint day: 26 June
- Website: Official website

Muggia (Triestine: Muja; Friulian: Mugle; Slovene: Milje) is an Italian comune (municipality) in the regional decentralization entity of Trieste, in the region of Friuli-Venezia Giulia on the border with Slovenia. It has 12,703 inhabitants.

Lying on the eastern flank of the Gulf of Trieste in the northern Adriatic Sea, Muggia is the only Italian port town in Istria. The town's architecture is marked by its Venetian and Austrian history, and its harbour hosts a modern 500-berth marina for yachts (Porto San Rocco).

Muggia lies in northern Istria. Its territory, limited on the sea-side by a shoreline of more than 7 kilometres (4 mi) featuring a coastal road and on the border side by a hill system, Monti di Muggia, including Mt. Castellier, Mt. S. Michele, Mt. Zuc and Monte d'Oro, that dominate over a vast landscape of Triestinian and Istrian coast, is characterized by a rich sub-continental vegetation of both Karstic and Istrian type.

It has a border crossing, known as San Bartolomeo, with Slovenia and the extreme east of the comune at Lazzaretto. The Slovenian border crossing is called Lazaret in the Municipality of Koper.

== Name ==
Muggia was attested in historical sources as Mugla in AD 933. The origin of the name Muggia is uncertain; it may have arisen from Latin mūtila 'cut short, mutilated', in reference to a short projection from the land or a cape (cf. the cape north of Zadar, attested in Latin as Muchla bona in AD 1250, now Croatian Oštri rat). Another possibility is derivation from Latin *mūcla 'milestone', and another hypothesis is that it comes from Vulgar Latin *Lamūc(l)a 'small swamp'. The Slovene name Milje was borrowed from Proto-Romance Mugla (developing via *Mygla > *Migla > Milje).

== History ==
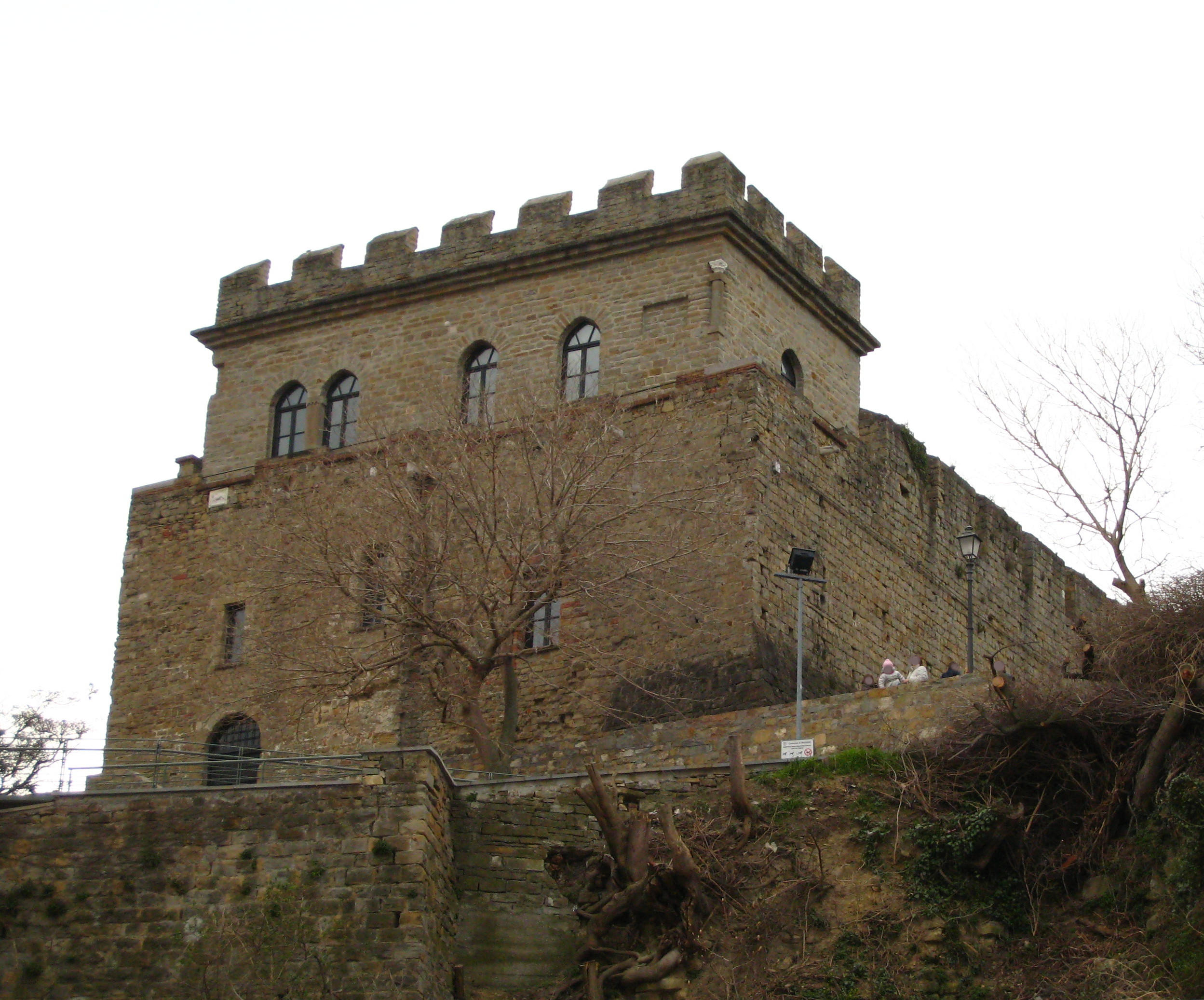
Muggia Castle

Muggia originated as a prehistoric fortified village (castelliere), around 8th-7th century BC. The territory was conquered in 178–177 BC by the Romans, who created here a settlement (Castrum Muglae). After the fall of the Western Roman Empire, Muggia was under Ostrogoth, Lombard, Byzantine, Avar and Frank dominations, until, in 931, king Hugh of Italy donated it to the Patriarch of Aquileia.

Before the year 1000 a new settlement was built on the seashore. After the 13th century the new village, now grown to the status of city, pronounced itself a municipality and defined its territory as bordering with those of Trieste and Koper, but stayed still politically bound to the Patriarchy of Aquileia. From this period are the cathedral and the city hall, the latter having been rebuilt in the last century. In 1420 it became part of the Republic of Venice.

After Venice's fall in 1797, Muggia became part of the Austrian Empire, under which it developed an important naval shipbuilding industry which flourished until after World War II. Throughout the Austro-Hungarian period it remained part of the Margravate of Istria, first within the Kingdom of Illyria and then, after 1861, within the Austrian Littoral. The municipality of Muggia historically extended further south than today, including several settlements that are now part of Slovenia: Ankaran, Hrvatini, Elerji, Škofije, and Plavje.

After World War I and the dissolution of Austria-Hungary, the town was annexed to the Kingdom of Italy and incorporated into the Province of Trieste. In the 1930s, the area developed a strong Communist underground activity against Benito Mussolini's Fascist regime. In 1945, it was occupied by the Yugoslav People's Army and from 1947 to 1954 it was part of the Free Territory of Trieste, a formally independent territory directly administered by the United Nations. The territory was internally divided into two zones ruled by military governors - Muggia ended up in the northern Zone A ruled by Anglo-Americans, while the southern Zone B was ruled by the Yugoslav army. In 1954 the two zones were handed over to Italian and Yugoslav civilian governments and de facto annexed by the two countries in an arrangement finally formalized in the 1975 Treaty of Osimo, which established the former borders between Zones as the new Italy-Yugoslavia international border. Following the breakup of Yugoslavia in the early 1990s it formed the border between Italy and the newly independent Slovenia. Following Slovenia's accession to the European Union in May 2004 and the passport-free Schengen Area in January 2008, all border controls have been removed, making the Italian-Slovenian border which runs just south and east of Muggia, practically invisible to travellers.

== Demographics ==
Historical population

Year	Pop.	±%
1921	11,548	—
1931	11,962	+3.6%
1936	12,028	+0.6%
1951	12,623	+4.9%
1961	12,638	+0.1%
1971	13,104	+3.7%

Year	Pop.	±%
1981	13,939	+6.4%
1991	13,214	−5.2%
2001	13,306	+0.7%
2011	13,022	−2.1%
2021	12,916	−0.8%

Source: ISTAT

== Main sights ==
Muggia provides many evident traces of its Venetian traditions and origin, as showed by the dialect, the gastronomic traditions, the gothic-venetian style of some houses, the devious "calli", the loggias, the ogive arches, the ancient coats of arms on the façades but mostly the main square, a true Venetian "campiello".

Memories of its early ages include an important pre-historic "castelliere" on Mt. Castellier (S. Barbara) and Roman (Archaeological Park of Castrum Muglae) and medieval remains in Muggia Vecchia (Old Muggia), once one of the guarding castles that in the 10th century were built to defend the Istrian border against the invasion of the Hungarians.

The Castle of Muggia, destroyed in 1353 by the Triestines, retains several remains of the previous period such as the ruins of the walls. A tower dating back to 1374 was due to the Patriarch of Aquileia Marquard of Muggia. Later in 1735, under the government of the Republic of Venice, it was restored, but it was totally abandoned during the following century. The Castle was restored by its current owners, the sculptor Villi Bossi and his wife Gabriella, and may be visited upon request.

The most important art attraction is the little basilica of Santa Maria Assunta (11th-13th century), housing frescoes from the 14th-15th centuries. The Duomo, dating from the 13th century, with a white stone facade with a Gothic rose window and a lunette containing a high relief representing the Holy Trinity adored by Saints John and Paul, is located on Muggia's main square.

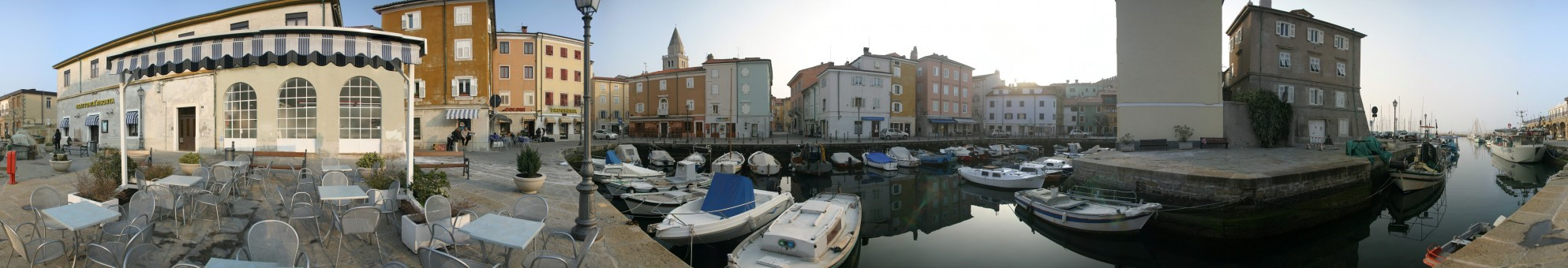
Panorama of Muggia

== Culture ==
Among the occurrences characterizing the socio-cultural life of this small city is well worth mentioning the Carnival of Muggia.

The Carnival absorbs much of the population of Muggia. During seven days the city becomes a open-air theatre offering a continuous entertainment that climaxes in the parade on the last Sunday. The town also has a museum of modern art named after sculptor Ugo Carà.

== International relations ==
=== Sister cities / Twin towns ===
- Koper, Slovenia
- Obervellach, Austria

== Notable residents ==
- Willer Bordon (1949–2015), politician
- Villi Bossi (born 1939), sculptor
- Giovanni Cattai (born 1945), football player
- Niccolò Giani (1909–1941), philosopher and journalist
- Dario Hübner (born 1967), football player
- Giuseppe Tarlao (1904–1978), football player
- Vittorio Vidali (1900–1983), communist activist and politician

== Muggia comune ==
=== Towns ===
- Muggia

=== Villages ===
- Aquilinia
- Boa
- Chiampore
- Lazzaretto
- Villaggio Castalietto

== See also ==
- Istria
- Venezia Giulia
- Plavje
