= Church of Saints John and Paul, Muggia =

Church building in Muggia, Italy

Church of Saints John and Paul Chiesa dei Santi Giovanni e Paolo Cerkev sv. Janeza in Pavla
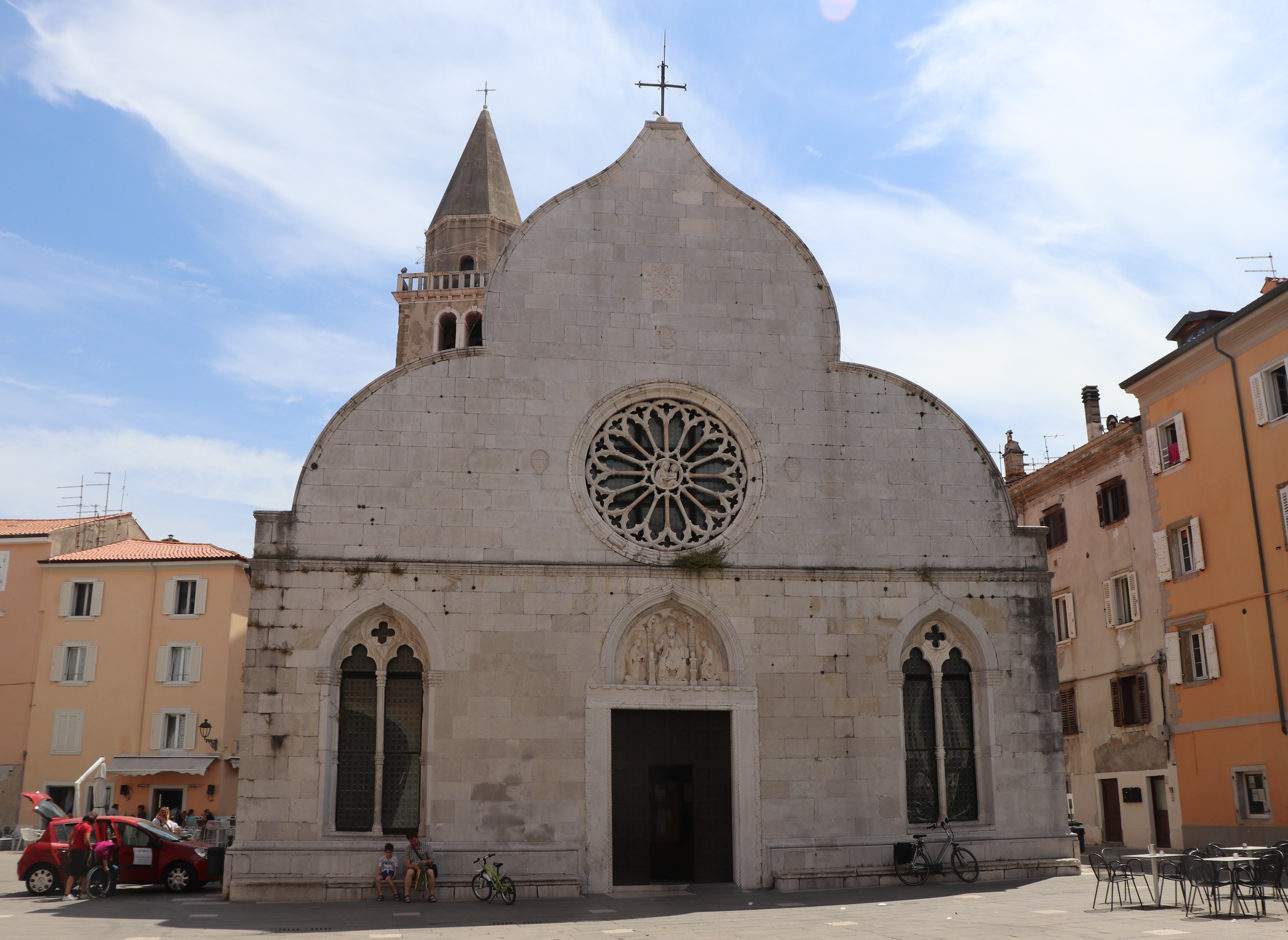
- Church of Saints John and Paul, Muggia

Religion
- Affiliation: Roman Catholic
- Diocese: Diocese of Trieste
- Rite: Roman
- Ecclesiastical or organizational status: Parish church
- Year consecrated: 1263

Location
- Location: Muggia, Italy
- Interactive map of Church of Saints John and Paul; Chiesa dei Santi Giovanni e Paolo; Cerkev sv. Janeza in Pavla
- Coordinates: 45.6042°N 13.7679°E

Architecture
- Type: Church
- Style: Romanesque, Gothic
- Groundbreaking: 13th century
- Completed: 1467

The Church of Saints John and Paul (Italian: Chiesa dei Santi Giovanni e Paolo, Slovene: Cerkev sv. Janeza in Pavla) is the main place of Catholic worship in Muggia, in the province of Trieste, seat of the homonymous parish belonging to the diocese of Trieste.

== History ==
The church, dedicated to Saints John and Paul, was built on the remains of a previous sacred building with three apses and was consecrated by the Bishop of Trieste Arlongo dei Visgoni on 29 December 1263. The Romanesque building was augmented, in the middle of the 15th century, by the cladding of the facade in white stone slabs, an example of Gothic-Venetian style. The church underwent a total remodeling between 1444 and 1467. In 1865 the facade, lying off-axis, was rebuilt from the rose window upwards and lowered by half a metre. The choir was lengthened in 1873 and a new high altar was consecrated in 1877.

== Description ==
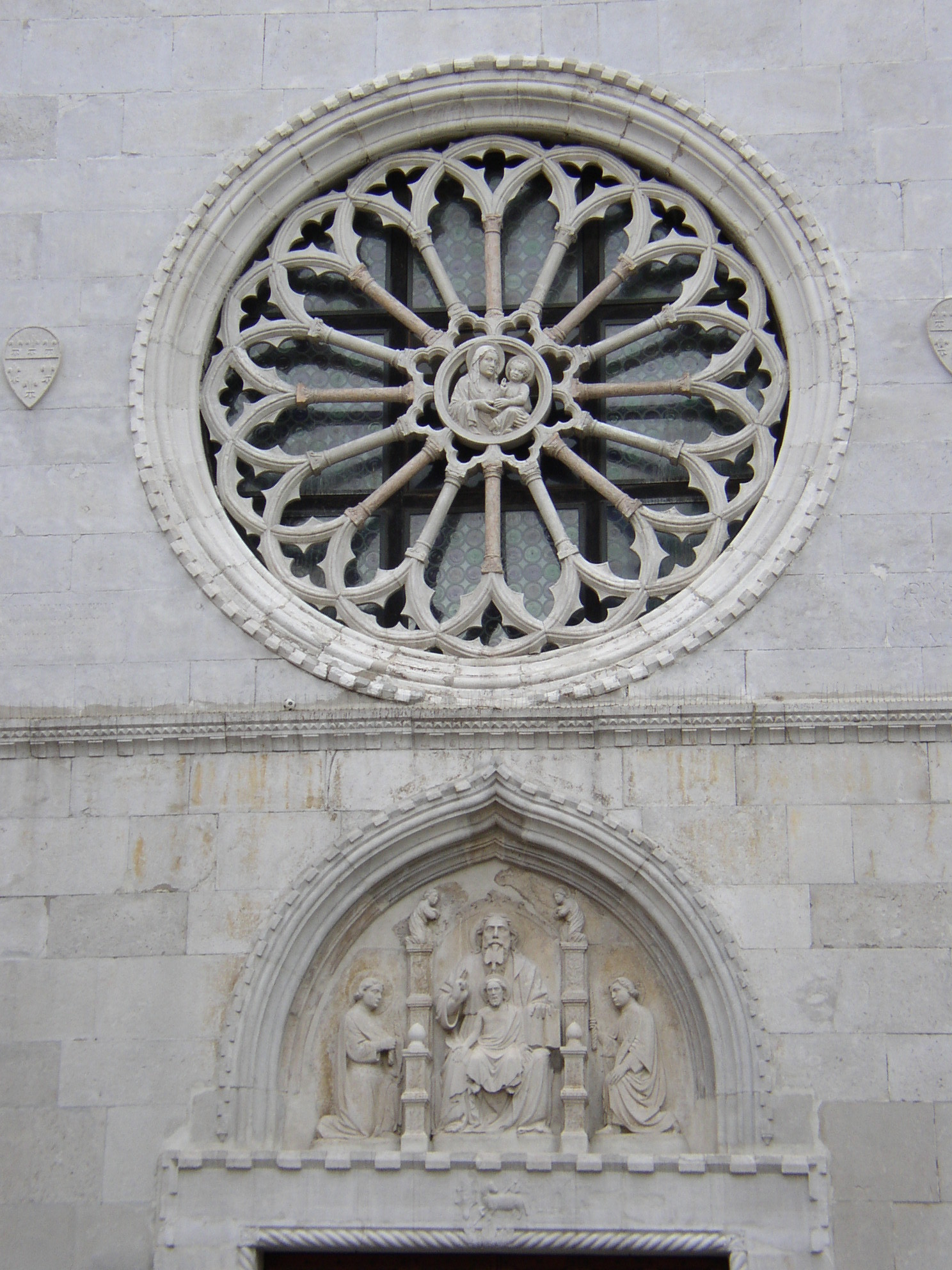
Portal lunette and rose window

=== Facade ===
The facade is in white stone with reliefs in the lunette of the portal; the whole is dominated by an imposing rose window in typical Gothic style. The upper part has the shape of a tribble. The same motif is present in the arches of the rose window, in the mullioned windows of the large windows and in the two windows discovered in 1937 under the mortar on the flank. The facade has a rose window in the upper part with the image of the Madonna and Child in the center surrounded by three epigraphs. The one on the left recalls the restoration of 1865, the one above the beginning of works on the facade under Bishop Nicolò (perhaps belonging to the Aldegardi family) while the one on the right mentions the podestà Pietro Dandolo (1466 - 1467), who followed the completion of the works. In the lower part, two elegant and slender Gothic windows flank the portal, on which is superimposed a lunette with an inflected arch, inside which an original representation of the Holy Trinity adored by Saints John and Paul is located in high relief.

=== Interior ===
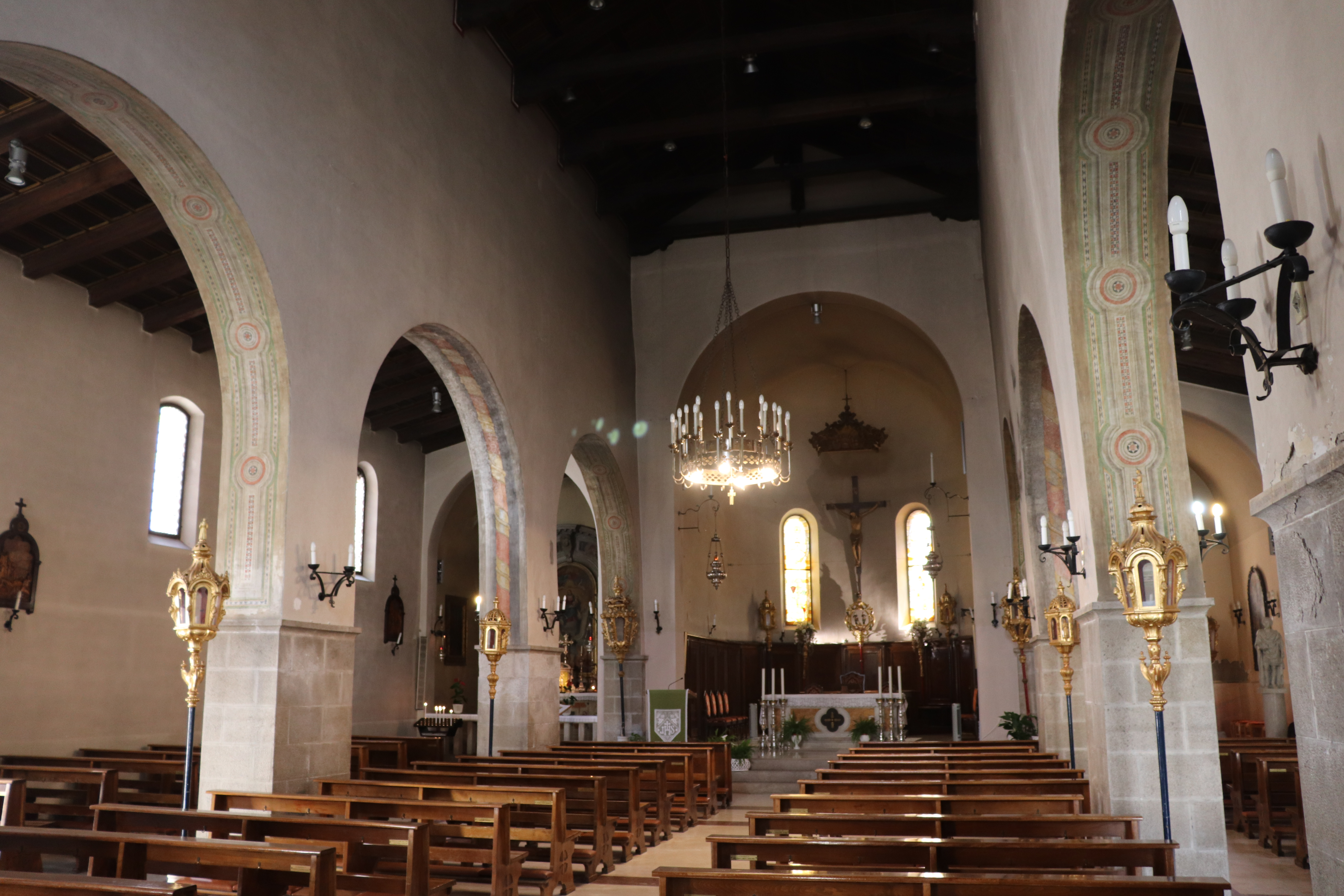
The interior

The interior, divided into three naves, was restored to its original state at the end of the 1930s, after the consolidations, the restorations and the removal of the lateral Baroque altars. A fragment of the exceptional 14th-century fresco can be seen which once occupied the central nave. Along the walls are some of the processional lights from the 18th and 19th centuries belonging to the old brotherhoods.

On the counterfacade choir loft is the Mascioni opus 939 pipe organ, built in 1971; with mixed transmission (mechanical for the manuals and the pedal, electric for the registers), it also has 16 registers on its two manuals and pedal. It was restored and expanded to 18 registers in 1991.

=== Bell tower ===
The bell tower consists of a square base, on which the building stands to a height of 35 metres. It is divided into 4 floors, embellished with Euganean trachyte frames, while the last one is embellished with mullioned windows. In all likelihood its construction dates back to well before the raising of the current cathedral. Indeed, the current clock has been present since the 14th century.

== Parish priests and administrators ==
- can. Pietro Buran (November 1811-June 1819);
- can. Giambattista Zaccaria (June 1819- January 1820), parish administrator;
- Floriano Ubaldini (January 1820-March 1835), parish administrator;
- Giovanni Ubaldini (March 1835-May 1856), parish priest;
- Pietro Degrassi (May–December 1856), parish administrator;
- Giuseppe Calice (December 1856-December 1859), parish priest;
- Giovanni Maria Derossi (December 1859-December 1860), parish administrator;
- Carlo Mecchia (December 1860-September 1888), parish priest;
- Clemente Seubla (September 1888-November 1889), parish priest;
- Sebastiano Merlato (November 1889-April 1890), parish administrator;
- Antonio Urbanaz (April 1890-May 1905), parish priest;
- Teobaldo Beacco (May 1905-February 1906) parish administrator;
- Antonio Germek (February 1906-February 1912) parish administrator;
- Giovanni Manega (February–November 1912) parish administrator;
- Giuseppe Ziac then Ziani (November 1912-June 1928), parish administrator;
- Mario Mizzan (June 1928-October 1962) parish priest;
- Giorgio Apollonio (June 1962- September 1996) parish priest;
- Giorgio Petrarcheni (September 1, 1996 – October 10, 2010) parish priest;
- Silvano Latin (10 October 2010- September 2020) parish priest;
- Andrea Destradi (September 6, 2020-) parish priest.

== Sources ==
- Guida rossa. Vol. Friuli-Venezia Giulia. Milano: Touring Club editore. 1999. pp. 202–203. ISBN 88-365-1162-7.
- Friuli Venezia Giulia - Guida storico artistica naturalistica. Trieste: Bruno Fachin Editore. 2004. p. 36. ISBN 88-85289-69-X.
