= University of Alcalá (1499–1836) =

Historical university in Spain

Coordinates: 40°28′26″N 3°21′46″E

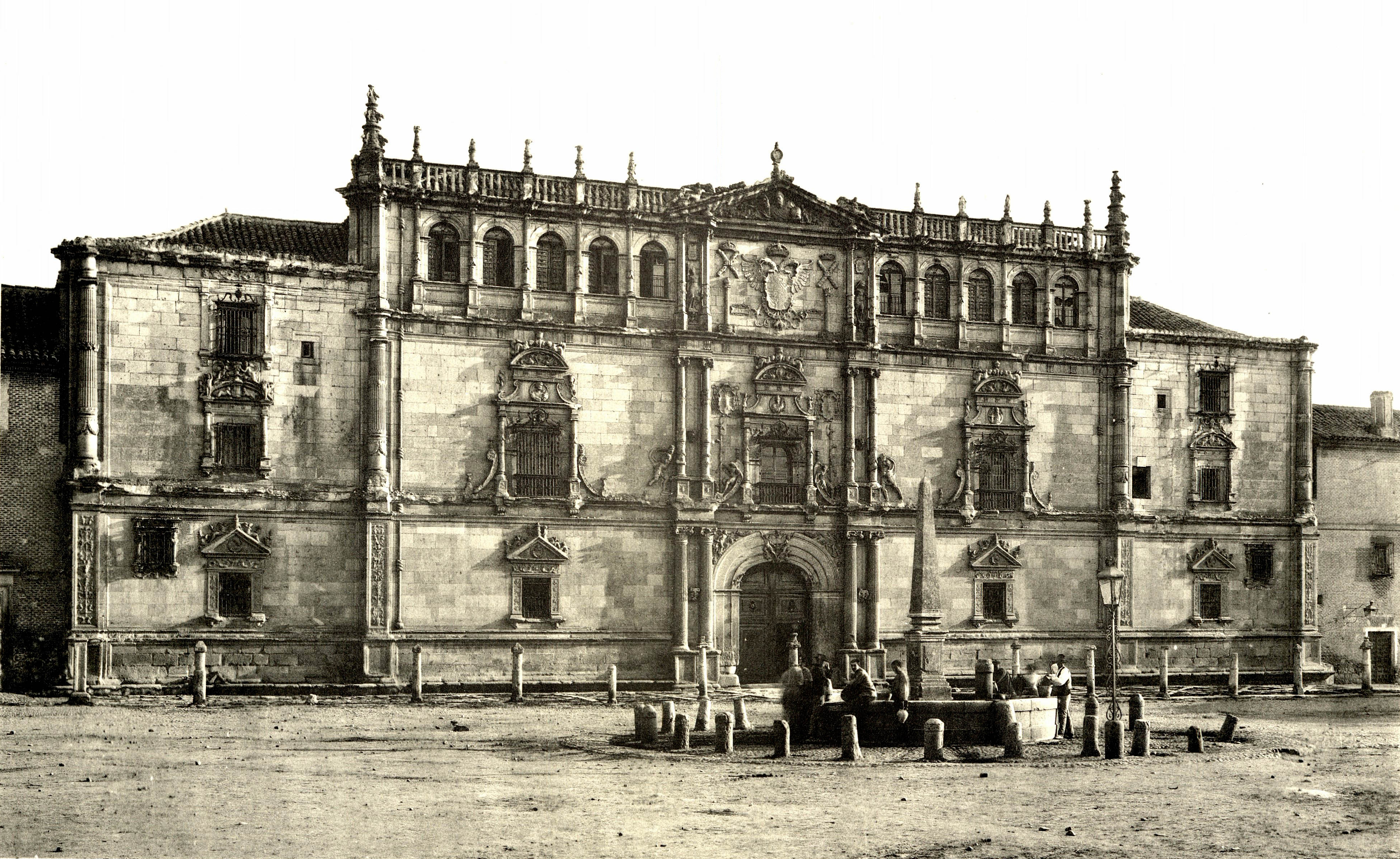
- Façade of the Colegio Mayor de San Ildefonso (Rodrigo Gil de Hontañón, 1543).
- Latin: Complutensis Universitas
- Type: College-University
- Active: 1293 (Studium generale); 1499 (University of Alcalá)–1836
- Founder: Cardinal Cisneros
- Location: Alcalá de Henares, Spain (Crown of Castile)
- Nicknames: Complutensis Universitas, Complutense University, Cisnerian University, Royal University of Alcalá

The University of Alcalá, also known as Complutense University or Cisnerian University (Latin: Complutensis Universitas), was a university located in Alcalá de Henares, Spain (now part of the Community of Madrid), from its founding by Cardinal Cisneros in 1499 until its relocation to Madrid in 1836. During the 16th and 17th centuries, it became a major center of academic excellence. In 1777, it was physically and administratively separated from its Colegio Mayor de San Ildefonso and renamed the Royal University of Alcalá, with its headquarters moved to the former building of the Faculty of Law. In 1836, the university was merged with the teachings of the Royal Studies of San Isidro and the Royal Museum of Natural Sciences in Madrid to form the Central University of Madrid, which later became the modern Complutense University of Madrid.

Its lecture halls hosted distinguished scholars and notable figures, including Antonio de Nebrija, Saint Thomas of Villanova, Juan Ginés de Sepúlveda, Saint Ignatius of Loyola, Domingo de Soto, Ambrosio de Morales, Benito Arias Montano, Francisco Suárez, Juan de Mariana, Francisco Vallés, Antonio Pérez, Saint John of the Cross, Mateo Alemán, Lope de Vega, Francisco de Quevedo, Pedro Calderón de la Barca, Gaspar Melchor de Jovellanos, Andrés Manuel del Río, Fray Diego Morcillo, and Blas Ortiz among others.

== Background: Studium Generale (1293–1499) ==
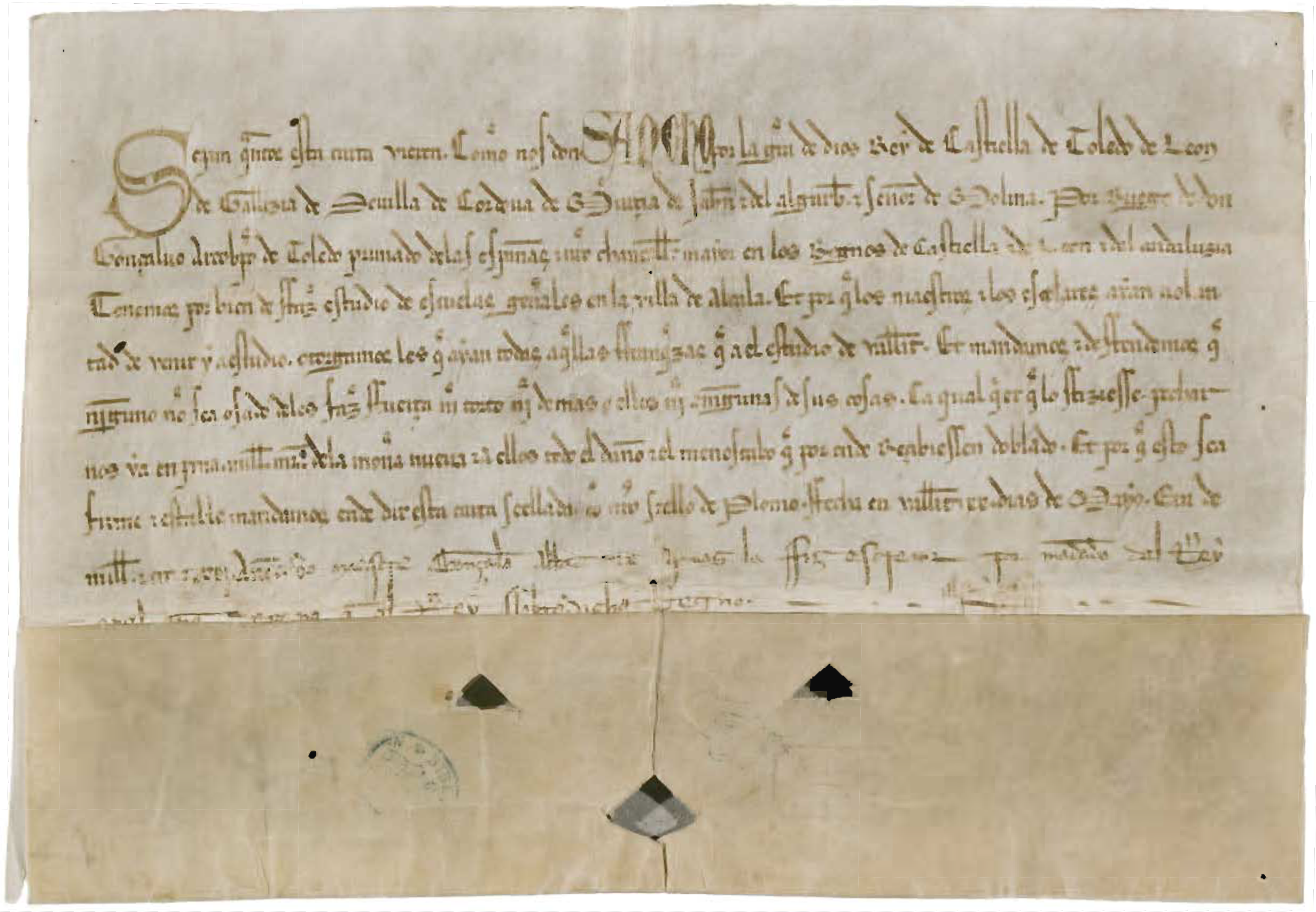
Privilege issued by Sancho IV of Castile to establish the General Studies in Alcalá de Henares (May 20, 1293).

On May 20, 1293, King Sancho IV of Castile granted permission to the Archbishop of Toledo, Gonzalo García Gudiel, to establish a Studium generale (General Studies, the term used for university studies at the time) in Alcalá de Henares, with "the same privileges for masters and scholars as those granted to the General Studies of Valladolid." These studies, though modest, persisted over time until they were incorporated into the Cisnerian refoundation. On July 17, 1459, Pope Pius II issued a bull, requested by Archbishop Alfonso Carrillo de Acuña, "for the establishment of three Chairs of Arts and Grammar in this study of Alcalá" in buildings adjacent to the San Francisco convent, later known as San Diego. These chairs, surviving from the 13th-century General Studies, were integrated by Cisneros into the "new" university.

== Cisneros, founder of the Complutensis Universitas ==
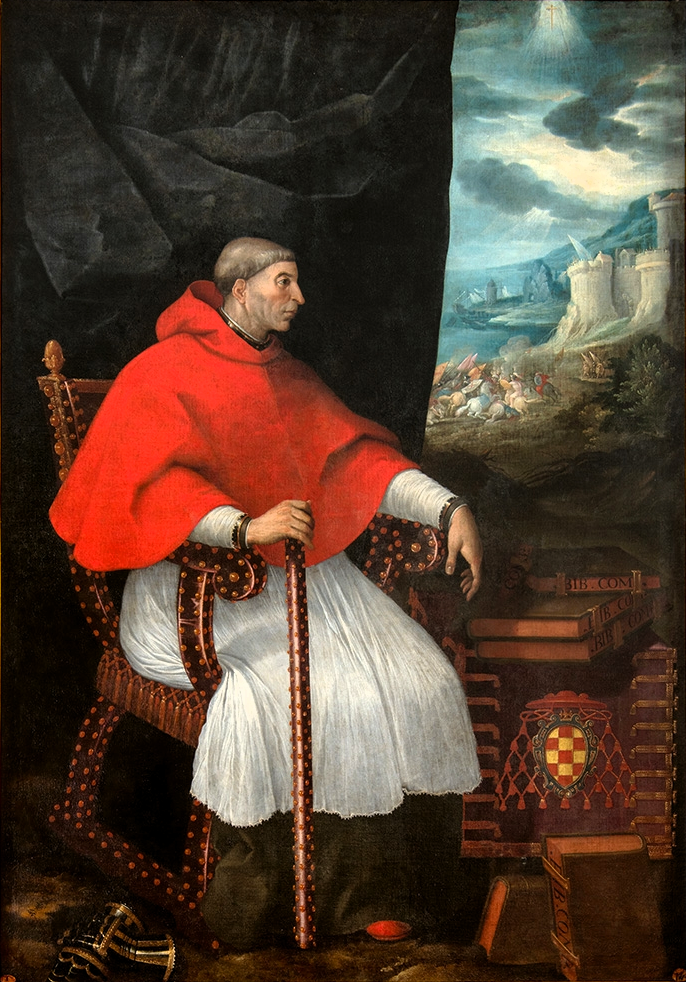
Cardinal Francisco Jiménez de Cisneros (1604), by Eugenio Cajés.

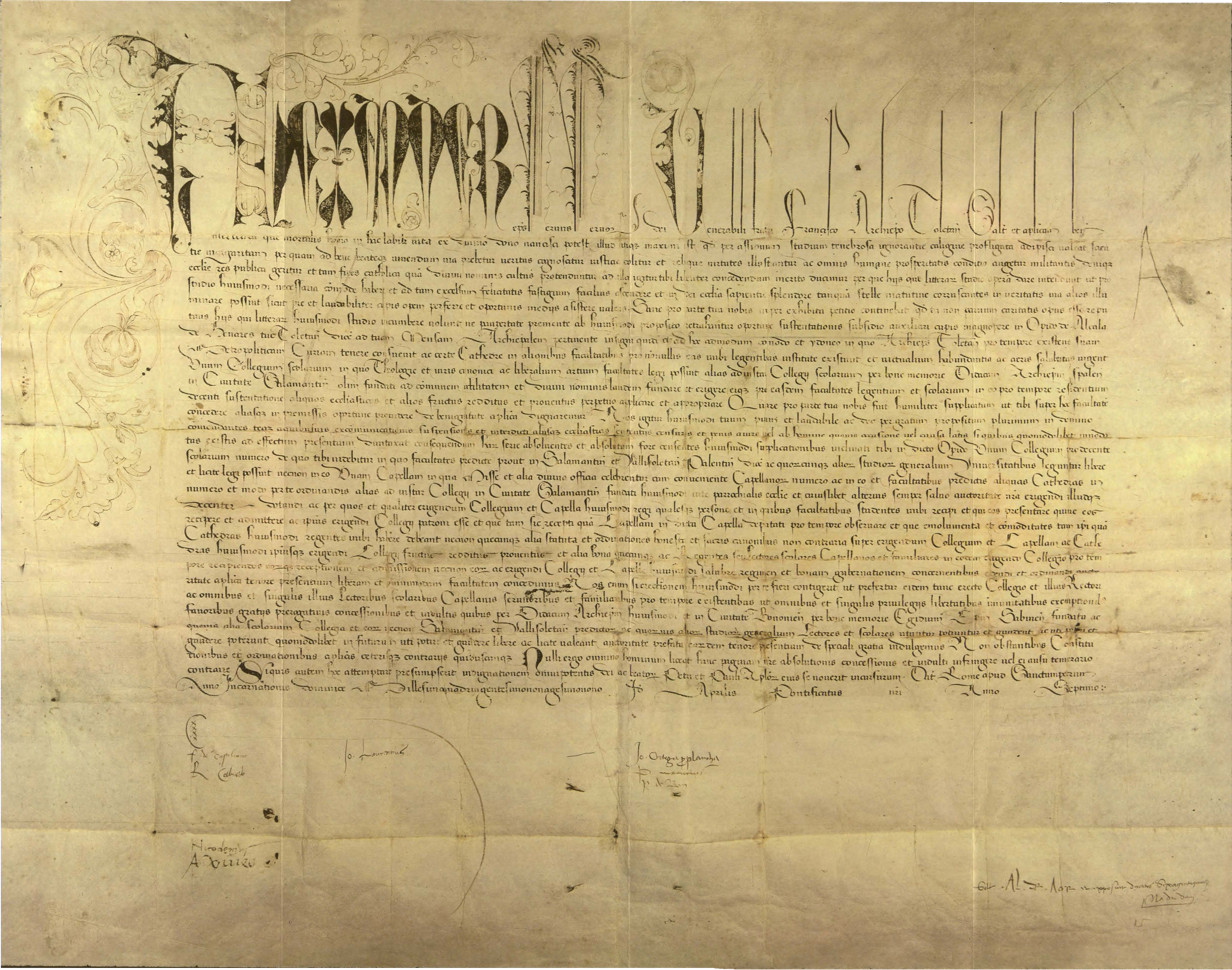
Bull of Alexander VI authorizing the foundation of the University of Alcalá (1499).

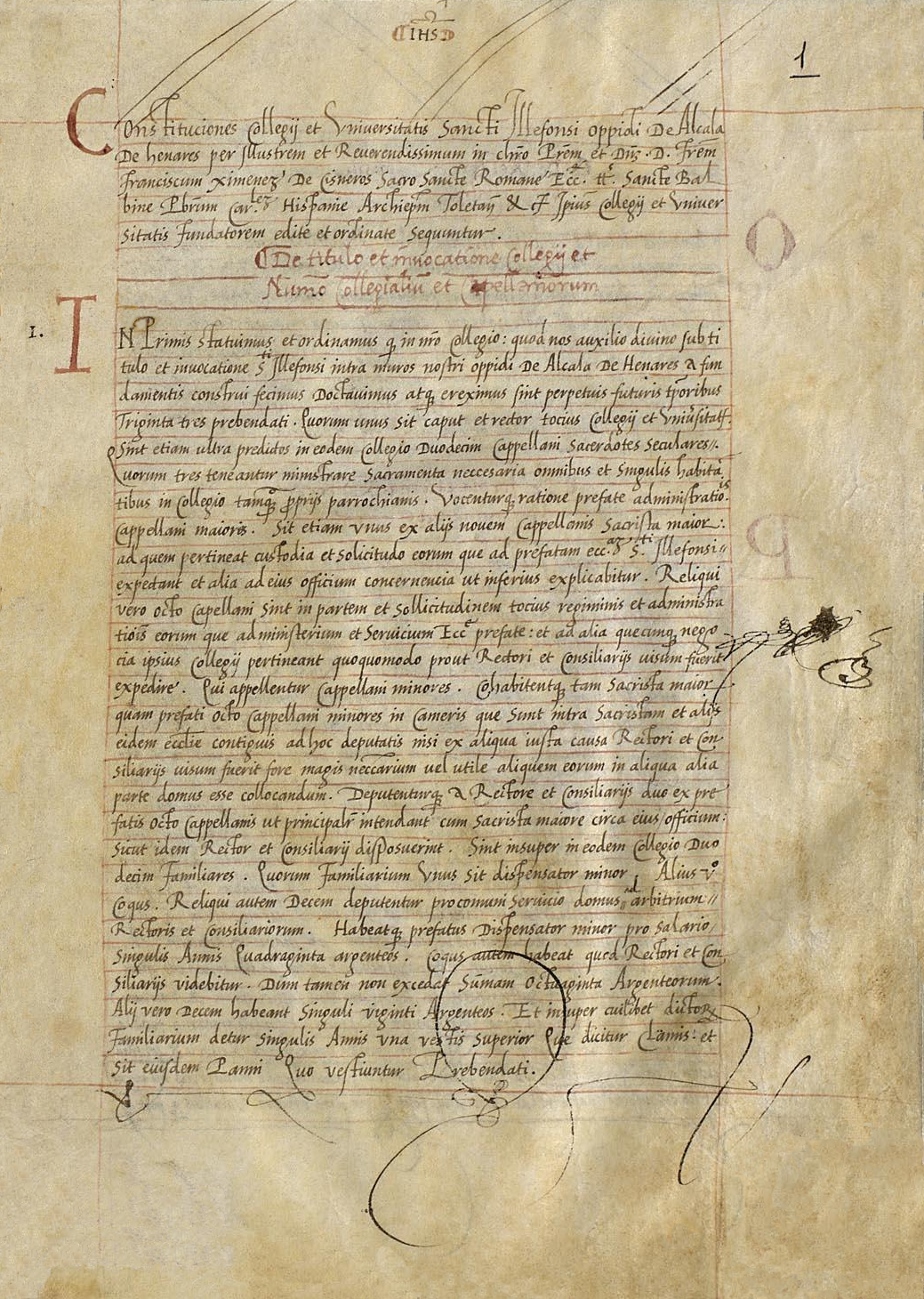
Original Latin constitutions of the Colegio Mayor de San Ildefonso (Francisco Jiménez de Cisneros, January 22, 1510).

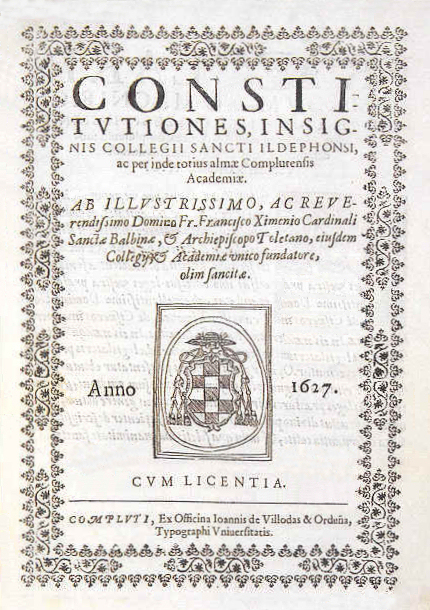
Constitutions of the University of Alcalá, 1627 Latin edition.

Cisneros, a former student of the General Studies, established the Complutensis Universitas (Complutense University, or University of Alcalá or Cisnerian) through three papal bulls granted by Pope Alexander VI on April 13, 1499. The term "Complutense" comes from the Roman settlement that gave rise to modern Alcalá de Henares: Complutum, possibly derived from confluvium (where rivers converge), though this is debated as the original Complutum was located on elevated ground, away from riverbeds. Complutense is thus the demonym for Alcalá.

With these bulls, Cisneros founded the institution, endowed it with necessary material and financial resources, and granted official recognition to its degrees. Well before obtaining the papal bull, Cisneros began acquiring land and constructing buildings for the future Civitas Dei (City of God), an innovative concept—the world’s first purpose-built university campus—that influenced other universities.

The cornerstone of the university’s main building was laid on March 14, 1501. The first cohort of students began their studies on October 18, 1508, the feast day of Saint Luke. Among them was Tomás García Martínez, later Archbishop of Valencia, known as Saint Thomas of Villanova.

== Cisneros' educational vision ==
By the 1509–1510 academic year, five faculties were operational: Arts and Philosophy, Theology, Canon Law, Letters, and Medicine. On January 22, 1510, Cisneros endowed his foundation with the "Constitutions of the Colegio Mayor de San Ildefonso," a regulatory framework governing all aspects of the university community, outlining the rights and duties of its members.

Cisneros adapted the university to the Modern Age, encouraging its active role in society and governance, beyond being a cloistered center for scholarly pursuits as in medieval convents. He established it with three objectives:

- Religious: An institution to train clergy to revive the spiritual values lost during the Middle Ages.
- Political: To educate qualified scholars and bishops capable of managing the complex affairs of the Catholic Monarchy.
- Cultural: To align theology with the principles of classical antiquity.

The university’s two primary roles were the rector, elected annually from the students of the Colegio Mayor de San Ildefonso, holding supreme academic, executive, economic, and jurisdictional authority; and the chancellor, a lifelong position held by the abbot of the Magistral Cathedral of Saint Justus and Saint Pastor, responsible for conferring academic degrees under apostolic authority. These roles often led to conflicts throughout the institution’s history.

The curriculum positioned the University of Alcalá as a beacon of Christian humanism. Theology was the core discipline, with other fields like Canon law, Philosophy, Medicine, Grammar, Rhetoric, and biblical languages as subsidiaries. The Faculty of Theology organized its three main chairs around the leading theological schools of 15th-century Europe: Scotism, Nominalism, and Thomism. These were taught on equal footing, providing students in Hispanic lands a uniquely broad, syncretic, and comparative theological education.

== University organization ==
The organizational structure of the Complutense University consisted of:

- The Rector, the highest academic and legal authority, was also the rector of the Colegio Mayor de San Ildefonso, elected annually from its sponsored students, and oversaw all affiliated minor colleges. Minor colleges also elected their own rectors (effectively vice-rectors) from their sponsored students.
- The Chancellor, responsible for awarding academic degrees, was a lifelong position held by the abbot of the Magistral Cathedral of Saint Justus and Saint Pastor in Alcalá de Henares, titled "Magistral."
- Chapels, collegiate governing bodies that met periodically in both the major and minor colleges to address key matters such as electing the rector and three councilors, appointing college officials, and reviewing financial and legal reports.
- Claustros, university-specific collegiate bodies handling daily institutional affairs.

Additionally, various "officials" performed specific roles:

- College governance: chapel secretary, inspectors of minor colleges, and informants.
- Financial administration: receiver, steward, account deputies, treasurer, and managers.
- Material tasks: refectory management, building maintenance, medical care, etc.
- University governance: university secretary and councilors.
- Justice administration: conservator, rector’s advisor, syndic prior, general solicitor, scholastic court notary, bailiffs, prosecutors, and lawyers.
- University ceremonies: master of ceremonies and beadles.
- Maintenance: student housing appraiser, caretakers, and works masters.

== Students ==
The Complutense University was exclusively male, as was typical for the period, with the exception of María Isidra de Guzmán y de la Cerda, who in 1785 earned a doctorate and master’s degree in the Faculty of Arts and Letters. The Colegio Mayor de San Ildefonso was the main academic hub, where classes were held (always in Latin). Minor colleges, and even the major college, served as student residences.

Students were distinguished by their clothing. Members of religious orders wore their respective habits. In secular colleges, students typically wore a bonnet, a mantle, a beca, and a rosette (a circular ornament sewn onto the beca), distinguished by fabric colors.

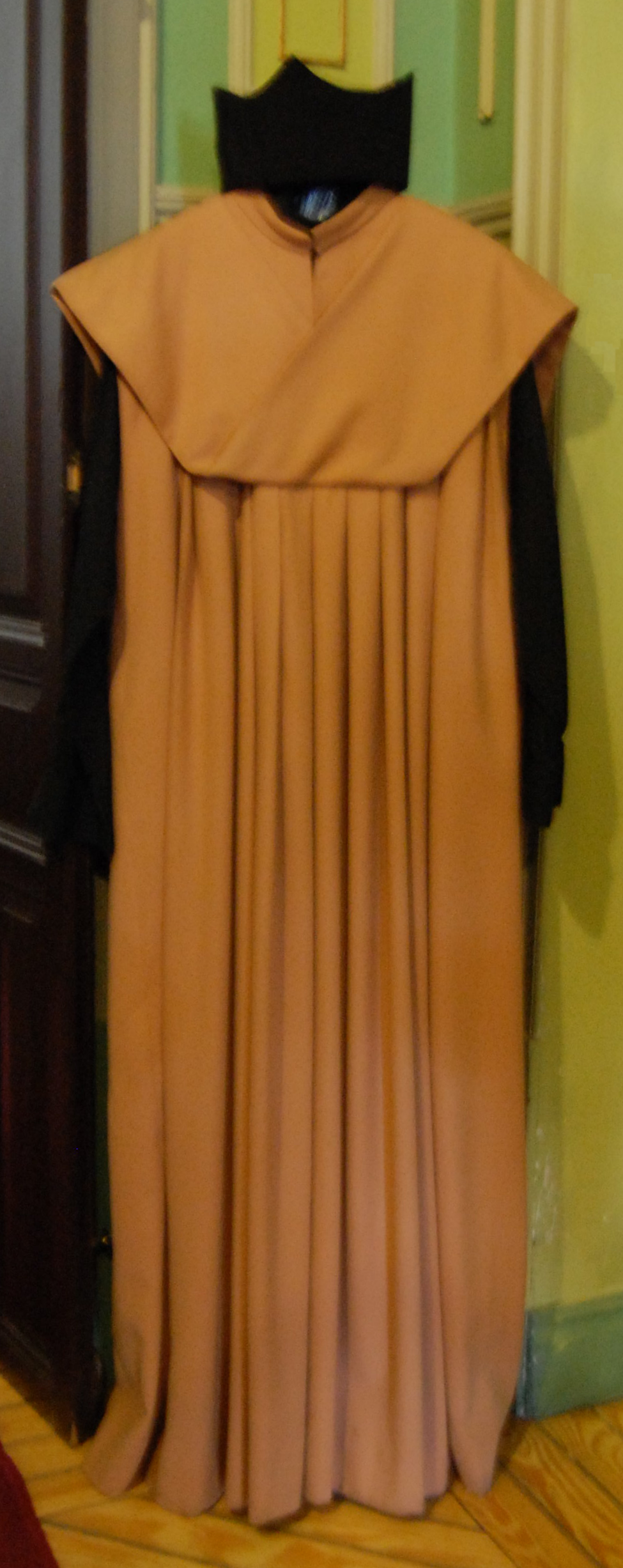
Academic attire of the Colegio Mayor de San Ildefonso.

Academic Attire of the Students of the University of Alcalá
| College | Bonnet | Mantle | Beca | Rosette | Other |
|---|---|---|---|---|---|
| Colegio Mayor de San Ildefonso | Yes | cinnamon | cinnamon | Yes | |
| Colegio San Jerónimo or Colegio Trilingüe | Yes | sky blue | maroon | | |
| Colegio San Felipe y Santiago or Colegio del Rey | Yes | brown | blue | Yes | |
| Colegio San Juan Bautista or Colegio de los Vizcaínos | | brown | black | | |
| Colegio Santiago or Colegio de Manriques | | black | None | None | Band hanging from the shoulder |
| Colegio San Jerónimo or Colegio de Lugo | | crimson | crimson | | |
| Colegio Santa María de la Regla y de los Santos Justo y Pastor or Colegio de León | | teal | light green | | |
| Colegio Santa Catalina Mártir or Colegio de los Verdes | | green | crimson | | |
| Colegio San Clemente Mártir or Colegio de los Manchegos | | blue | tawny | | |
| Colegio San Lucas Evangelista or Colegio de Magnes | | dark blue | black | | |
| Colegio Santa Justa y Santa Rufina or Colegio de Sevillanos | | brown | brown | | |
| Colegio San Ciriaco y Santa Paula or Colegio de Málaga | | brick red | purple | | |
| Colegio San Martín y Santa Emerenciana or Colegio de Aragón | | purple | cinnamon | | |
| Colegio Santos Justo y Pastor or Colegio de Tuy | | green | cinnamon | Yes | |
| Colegio Inmaculada Concepción de Nuestra Señora | Clerical | dark turquoise | dark turquoise | | Black inner garment and white collar |
| Colegio Infantes or Colegio de los Seises | Red | black | crimson | No | |

== Minor colleges ==
University and Historic Precinct of Alcalá de Henares
UNESCO World Heritage Site
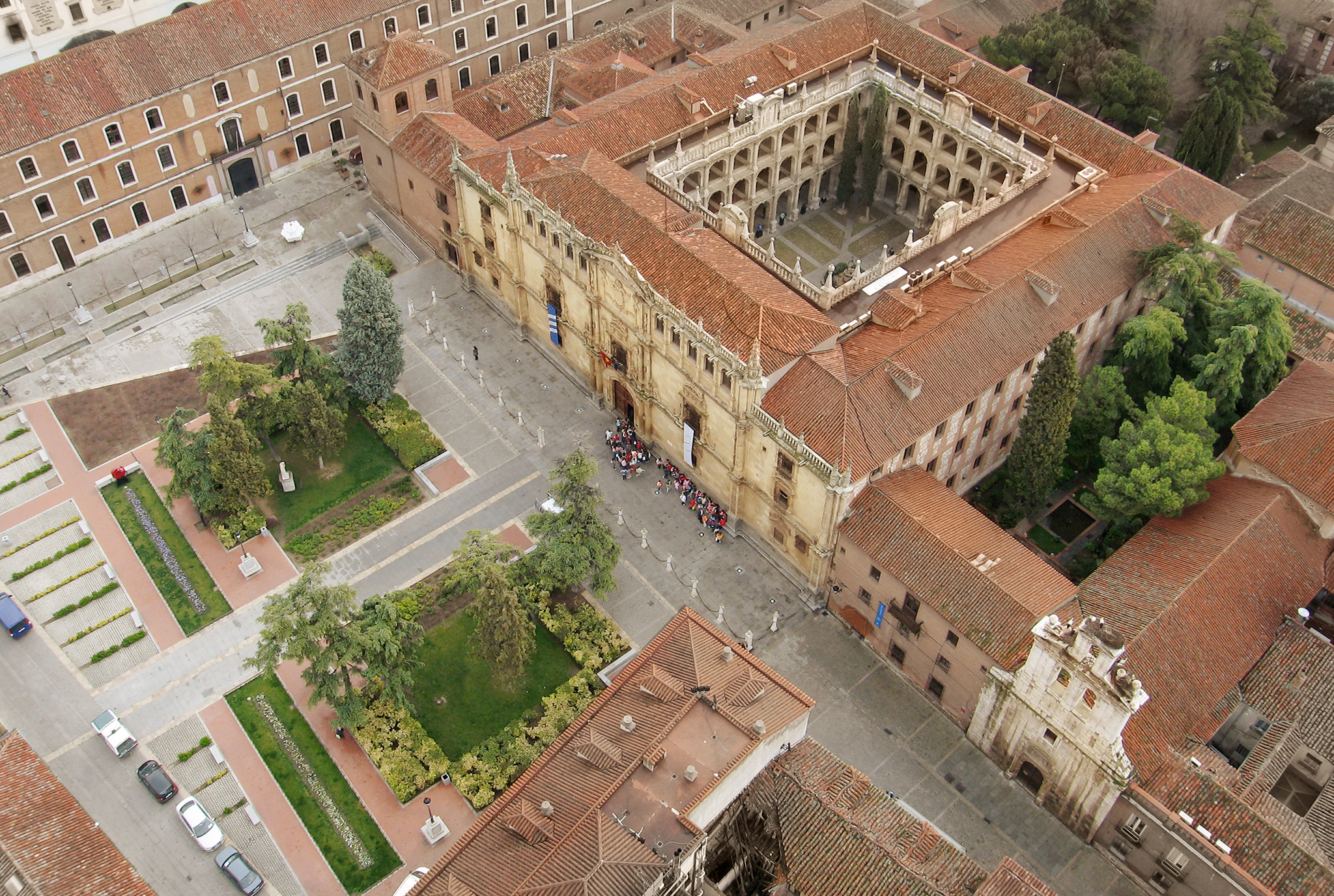
- Buildings of the University of Alcalá
- Interactive map of University and Historic Precinct of Alcalá de Henares
- Location: Alcalá de Henares
- Criteria: Cultural: ii, iv, vi
- Reference: 876
- Inscription: 1998 (22nd Session)

The Cisnerian foundation of the Colegio Mayor de San Ildefonso was accompanied by the creation of other "minor" colleges. In 1513, Cisneros established six new colleges, generally independent, unlike later ones linked to religious orders, though they had some dependence on the major college, as initial years were often studied there. The minor colleges founded by Cardinal Cisneros were:

- Colegio de San Pedro y San Pablo, the only one tied to a religious order, the Franciscan, which founded it.
- Colegio de la Madre de Dios (known as the College of Theologians), primarily for Theology, though it also excelled in Medicine.
- Colegio de Santa Catalina (known as the College of Artists—bachelors in Arts—or Physicists), for studying Aristotle’s physics.
- Colegio de Santa Balbina (known as the College of Logicians), for logic and other philosophical and theological disciplines of early Arts courses.
- Colegio de San Eugenio and Colegio de San Isidoro (of Grammarians, for Latin and Greek), which merged in the 17th century into the Colegio de San Ambrosio.

After Cisneros’ death, from the second quarter of the 16th century, minor colleges linked to religious orders (Augustinians, San Basilio Magno College-Convent, Calced and Discalced Carmelites, Cistercians, Minor Regular Clerics, Dominicans, Franciscans, Jesuits, Calced and Discalced Mercedarians, and Calced and Discalced Trinitarians), military orders, dioceses (e.g., San Clemente Mártir or Manchegos), royal foundations (e.g., by Philip II, such as San Felipe y Santiago, called “del Rey”), and private foundations (e.g., Santiago or de los Caballeros Manriques, Santa Catalina Mártir or de los Verdes, San Ciriaco y Santa Paula or Málaga, and San Jorge or Irish College) proliferated, expanding the university city with about thirty minor colleges.

== Biblical scholarship ==
During the 16th and 17th centuries, the University of Alcalá became a leading center of academic excellence. Its prestigious studies and faculty made it a model for new universities in Spanish America, and it was Spain’s primary hub of Renaissance humanism. It also became a reference point for Theology, attracting many Flemish and Irish students.

In the 18th century, amid changes in Spanish university education models, Gaspar Melchor de Jovellanos revitalized studies at Alcalá. However, a progressive decline had already begun, which various reforms attempted to halt.

== Royal University of Alcalá (1777–1836) ==
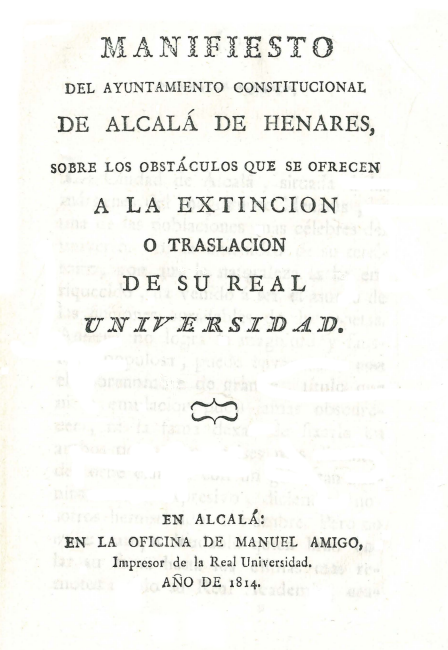
1814 manifesto by the Alcalá de Henares City Council opposing the extinction or relocation of the university.

In 1777, the university’s governance was separated from the Colegio Mayor de San Ildefonso through new statutes, and in 1779, several minor colleges were merged into the new Colegio Menor de la Inmaculada Concepción de Nuestra Señora. The university, renamed the Royal University of Alcalá, was relocated to the former Jesuit College in Alcalá de Henares. In 1785, María Isidra de Guzmán y de la Cerda became the first woman in Spain to receive a doctorate in Philosophy. On October 5, 1797, the Royal University returned to its original seat at the Colegio Mayor, where it remained until its closure in 1836.

In 1824, Francisco Tadeo Calomarde incorporated the University of Sigüenza into Alcalá.

== Relocation to Madrid (1836) ==
In 1836, under the reign of Isabella II of Spain, the university was moved to Madrid, where it became the Central University of Madrid. On October 2, 1848, Vicente de la Fuente, the last rector of the Colegio de Málaga, was tasked with transferring the Complutense University’s library to the Central University of Madrid. In three months, he organized and relocated its 20,000 volumes to a new facility opened in Madrid on San Bernardo Street on January 10, 1849. In 1970, the institution adopted the name Complutense University of Madrid.

The buildings that had housed Cardinal Cisneros’ university were auctioned off in 1845 and passed into private hands. The first buyer, silk entrepreneur Joaquín Alcober, planned to establish a silkworm farm and loom in the Colegio Mayor de San Ildefonso but abandoned the project and sold the complex. It was acquired by Javier de Quinto y Cortés, a prominent politician and patron ennobled by Isabella II as Count of Quinto, who removed many artworks from Alcalá and destroyed others, including the university arch. To prevent further loss of the university’s real estate, a group of Alcalá residents formed the Society of Co-owners of the Buildings that were University in 1851 to protect and preserve the historical heritage. Today, descendants of these residents own a significant portion of the former university buildings, known as the University Block, leased to the modern University of Alcalá.

== University restoration in Alcalá de Henares (1977) ==
In 1975, several faculties dependent on the Complutense University of Madrid were established in Alcalá to alleviate overcrowding. In 1977, these centers formed the “new University of Madrid based in Alcalá de Henares.” In 1981, the legal adoption of its coat of arms and motto officially recognized the name “University of Alcalá de Henares.” On November 5, 1996, it adopted the name “University of Alcalá.”

On December 2, 1998, UNESCO declared the university and historic precinct of Alcalá de Henares a World Heritage Site.

== Notable alumni and faculty ==
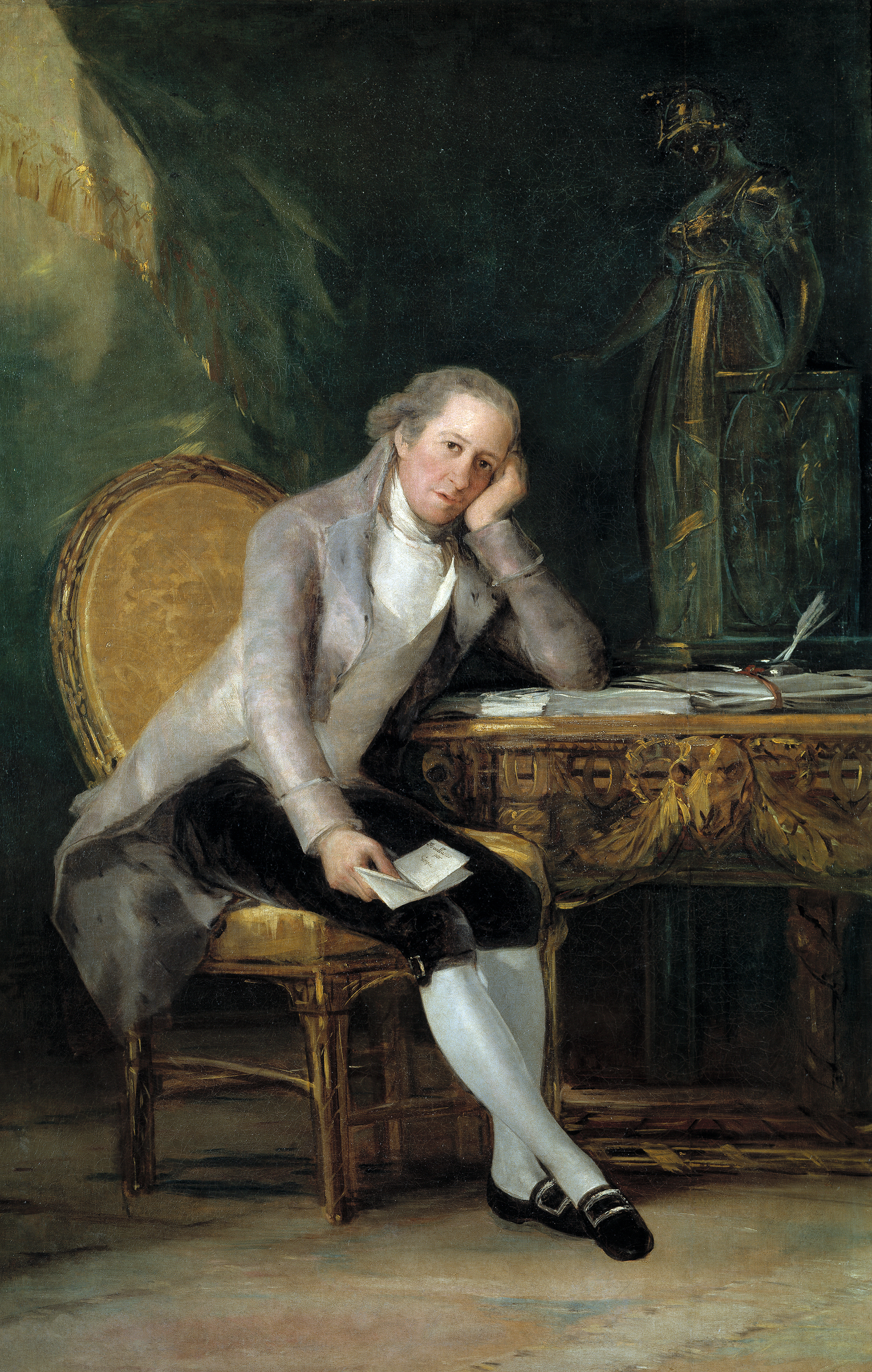
Gaspar Melchor de Jovellanos.

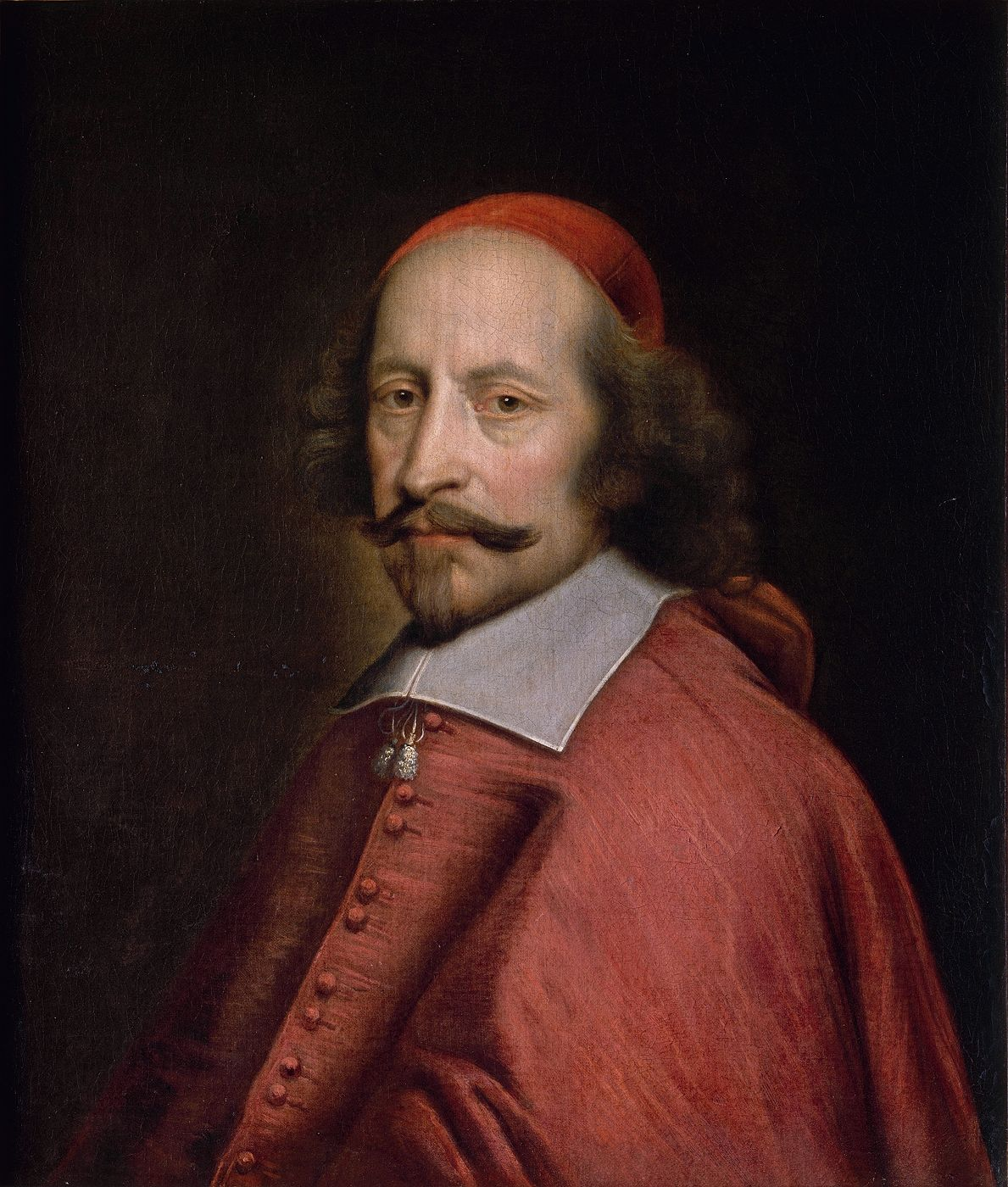
Cardinal Mazarin, cardinal and chief minister of France.

The University of Alcalá was home to some of the most prominent figures in Spanish history and culture.

=== Philologists and writers ===
- Antonio de Nebrija (1441–1522), professor of Rhetoric and Latin Grammar.
- Juan de Vergara (1492–1557), humanist.
- Saint John of the Cross (1542–1591), Golden Age literary figure.
- Mateo Alemán (1547–c.1615), author of the picaresque novel Guzmán de Alfarache.
- Lope de Vega (1562–1635), Golden Age literary figure.
- Tirso de Molina (1579–1648), Golden Age literary figure.
- Francisco de Quevedo (1580–1645), Golden Age literary figure.
- Pedro Calderón de la Barca (1600–1681), Golden Age literary figure.
- José Antonio Conde (1766–1820), Arabist and historian.

=== Physicians, biologists, philosophers, and scientists ===
- Alfonso García Matamoros (?-1572), rhetorician and humanist.
- Andrés Laguna (c.1510–1559), humanist physician specializing in pharmacology and medical botany.
- Andrés Manuel del Río (1764–1849), chemist and naturalist, discoverer of the chemical element vanadium.
- Blas Ortiz (1485–1552), Renaissance humanist.
- Diego de Argumosa (1792–1865), surgeon; first to use ether inhalation anesthesia in Spain in 1847.
- Diego Pérez de Mesa (1563–c.1632), mathematics professor from 1586–1595.
- Francisco Díaz de Alcalá (1527–1590), author of the first urology treatise.
- Francisco Vallés (1524–1592), Medicine professor and personal physician to Philip II of Spain.
- Juan Caramuel y Lobkowitz (1606–1682), philosopher, logician, and linguist.
- Juan Ginés de Sepúlveda (1490–1573), Renaissance humanist and philosopher.
- Juan Huarte de San Juan (1529–1588), physician, philosopher, and precursor to psychology with his Examen de ingenios para las Ciencias.
- Sebastián Izquierdo (1601–1681), logician, mathematician, and philosopher.

=== Politicians and nobility ===
- Alexander Farnese (1545–1592), military leader and diplomat in service of the Spanish crown.
- Antonio Pérez (1540–1611), personal secretary to Philip II of Spain.
- Gaspar Melchor de Jovellanos (1744–1811), Prime Minister of Spain, ideologist of the Spanish Constitution of 1812.
- John of Austria (1547–1578), son of King Charles I of Spain.
- Cardinal Mazarin (1602–1661), cardinal of the Catholic Church and successor to Cardinal Richelieu as head of the French government.
- Prince Charles (1545–1568), son of Philip II of Spain.

=== Religious figures ===
- Alonso Deza (1530–1589), theologian, Jesuit, and writer.
- Ambrosio de Morales (1513–1591), humanist, historian, and archaeologist.
- Blessed Juan de Palafox y Mendoza (1600–1659), bishop in Puebla de los Ángeles (Mexico) and Osma; advisor to the Council of the Indies.
- Benito Arias Montano (1527–1598), theologian, Hebraist, and polyglot writer.
- Francisco Javier de Arriaza (1708–1761), first bishop of the Diocese of Santander.
- Francisco López de Gómara (1511–1566), cleric and historian.
- Francisco Suárez (1548–1617), theologian, jurist, and philosopher.
- Fray Bartolomé de Carranza (1503–1576), theologian and Archbishop of Toledo.
- Fray Diego Morcillo Rubio de Auñón (1642–1730), Viceroy of Peru, Archbishop of La Plata, Archbishop of Lima, and Bishop of La Paz.
- Fray Domingo de Soto (1494–1560), Dominican theologian and confessor to Emperor Charles V.
- Juan de Mariana (1536–1624), Jesuit, historian, and philosopher.
- Melchor de Liñán y Cisneros (1629–1708), bishop of Santa Marta and Popayán, governor and captain general of the New Kingdom of Granada, president of the Royal Audience of Santa Fe de Bogotá, Archbishop of La Plata, Archbishop of Lima, and Viceroy of Peru.
- Pedro Ciruelo (1470–1548), 16th-century mathematician and theologian.
- Saint Ignatius of Loyola (1491–1556), founder and first general of the Society of Jesus.
- Saint John of Ávila (1500–1569), priest and ascetic writer.
- Saint Thomas of Villanova (1488–1555), Archbishop of Valencia (1544–1555), canonized by Pope Alexander VII in 1658.
- Francisco Valero y Losa (1664–1720), Archbishop of Toledo, studied at the Colegio Menor de los Manchegos.
- Francisco de Mendoza y Bobadilla, bishop of Coria and Burgos, and cardinal.

== See also ==
- University of Alcalá
- Complutense University of Madrid
- List of oldest universities in continuous operation
