= Darío Gael Blanco =

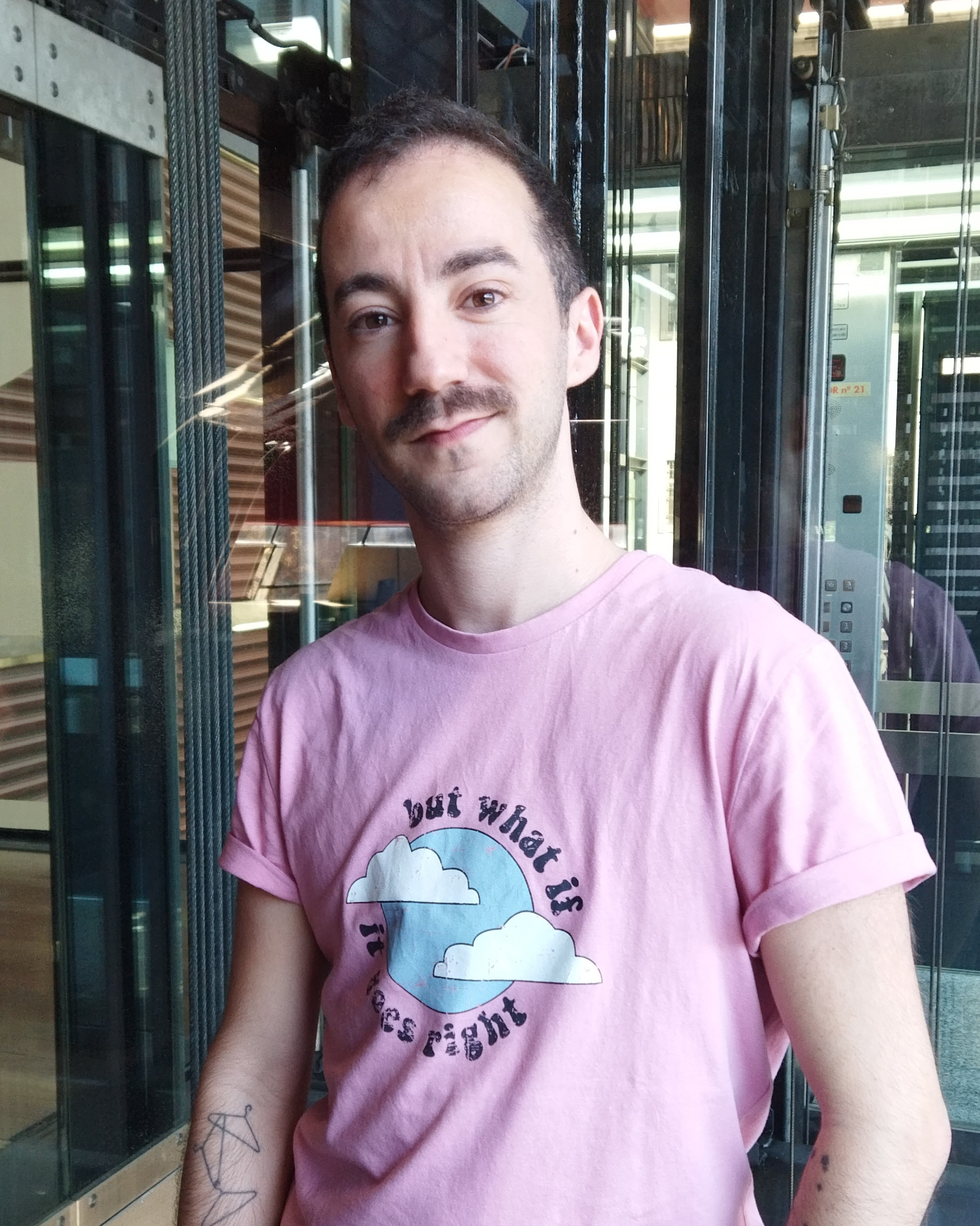
Blanco in 2024

Darío Gael Blanco (born in Madrid in 1989) is a Spanish writer, translator and trans rights activist.

== Early life ==
Blanco studied English Philology and Law at the University of Alcalá, and specialized in Literary Analysis and Gender Studies at the Humboldt University of Berlin. They began their transition at age 23 when they were taking part in an Erasmus programme in Berlin, documenting the changes on social media.

== Career ==
As an activist, they defended the Spanish Trans Law, which came into force in 2023. Before the law passed, they changed their registered sex on their national identity document.

They collaborate in magazines such as Vanity Fair Spain or Vogue Spain. They have written stories included in anthologies such as Cuadernos de Medusa II (Amor de Madre) and Asalto a Oz (Dos Bigotes) and collective essays such as Vidas Trans (Antipersona).

== Personal life ==
Blanco is non-binary, bisexual trans person.

== Works ==
- Cuadernos de Medusa II (Amor de Madre, 2019)
- Asalto a Oz (Dos Bigotes)
- Vidas Trans (Antipersona, 2019)
