= Morreale =

Morreale is a surname of Italian origin. It is a habitational name derived from Monreale, a town in the province of Palermo, Sicily. The word Monreale itself is derived from the words monte and reale, meaning "royal mountain". Notable people with the name include:

- Mike Morreale (born 1971), Canadian football player

== See also ==
- Gabriella Morreale de Escobar (1930–2017), Italian-born Spanish chemist
