= College of Málaga =

University in Spain

University and Historic District of Alcalá de Henares
UNESCO World Heritage Site
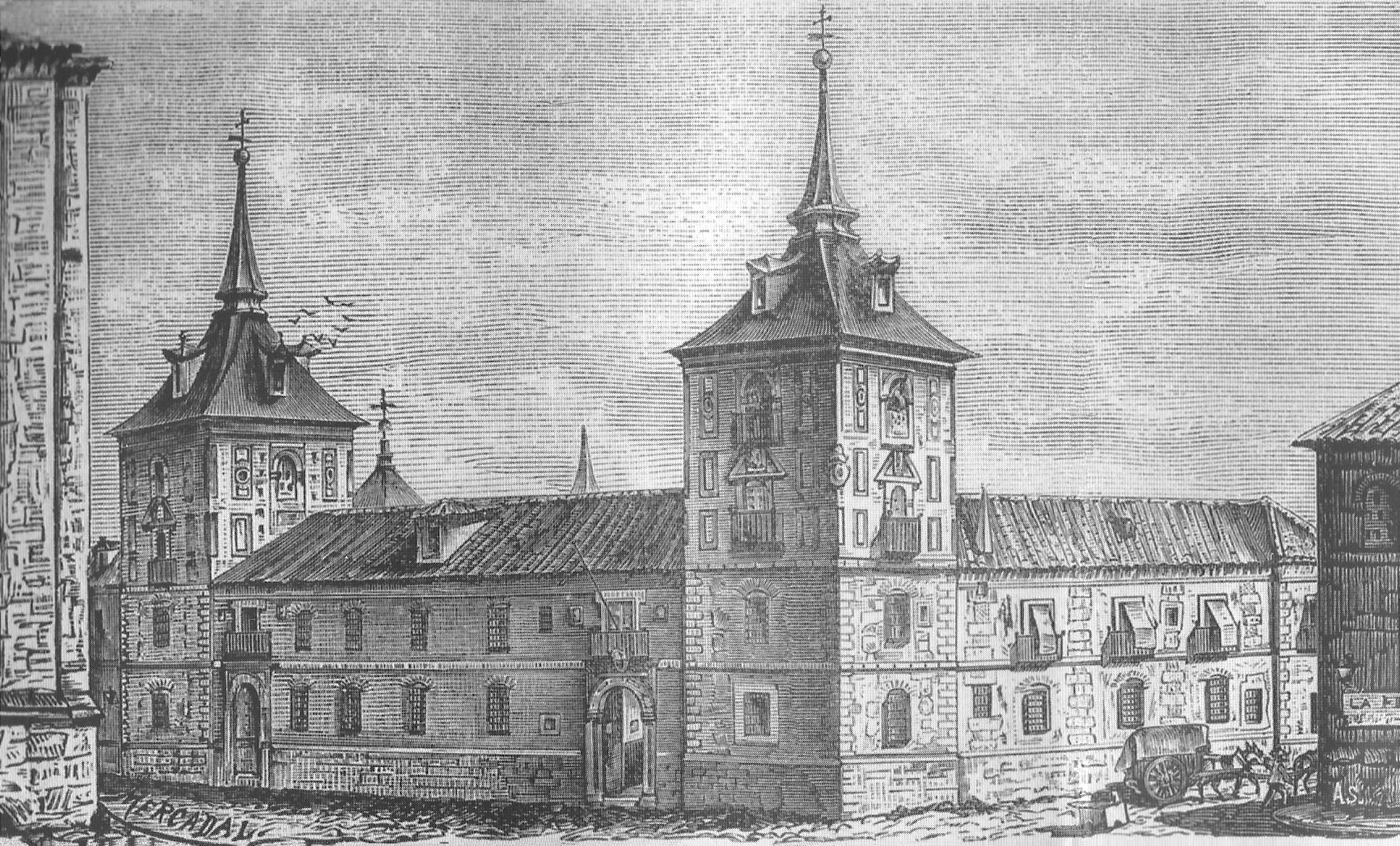
- Facade of the College of Málaga (engraving by Mercadal, 1882)

- Location within Spain
- Location: Spain
- Criteria: Cultural: II, IV, VI
- Reference: 876
- Inscription: 1998 (22nd Session)

The Colegio Menor de San Ciriaco y Santa Paula, popularly known as Colegio de Málaga, is one of the educational centres that made up the former Cisnerian University of Alcalá de Henares, and which currently houses the Faculty of Philosophy and Letters of the University of Alcalá.

== History ==
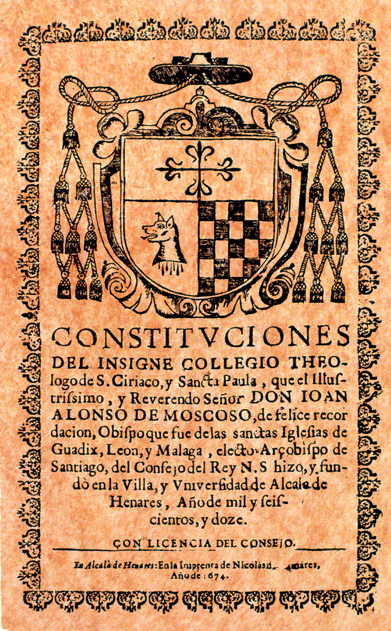
Constitutions of 1612, published in 1674 by the bishop of Malaga Juan Alonso de Moscoso.

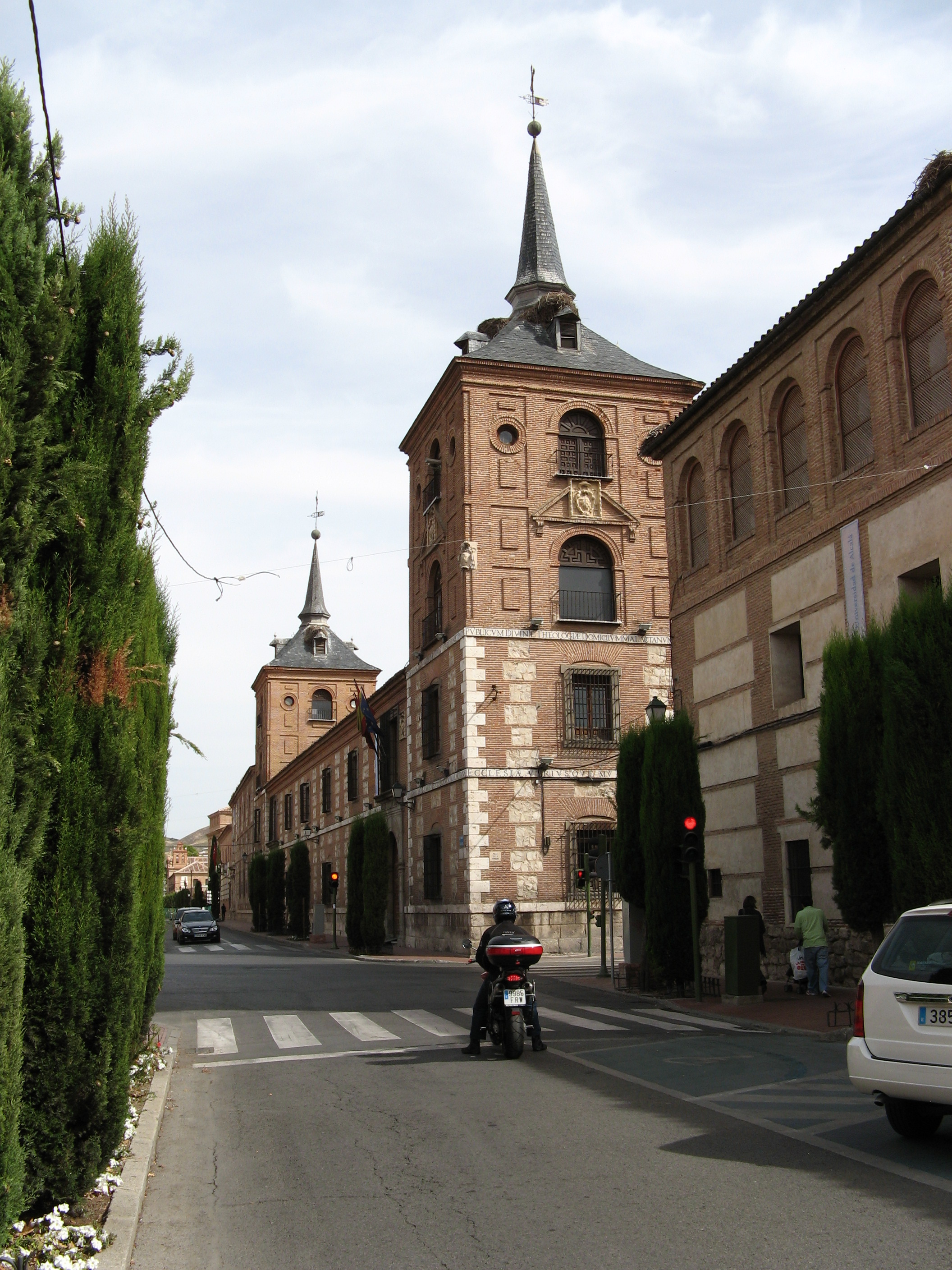
Foreshortened façade of the college.

The College of Málaga was founded in 1611 by Juan Alonso de Moscoso, successive bishop of Guadix-Baza, León and Málaga. He had studied at the Colegial Menor de la Madre de Dios and was a professor at the Colegio Mayor de San Ildefonso. The college, at the express wish of the bishop, was called "Colegio de San Ciriaco y Santa Paula", after the patron saints of Malaga. Although it is also known as "Colegio de la Paloma", as this was the name of one of its last functions; and popularly as "Colegio de Málaga", due to the fact that its first students were from Malaga: twelve theology students and four canon students.

Construction began around 1623 in Colegios Street, perhaps under the direction of Juan Gómez de Mora, although the master builder was Sebastián de la Plaza. It was finished almost at the end of the century, by two other master builders, José de Ocaña and Francisco González Bravo, due to financial difficulties and various disputes with neighbouring colleges and continued even during the 18th century.

In 1781, the minor colleges of Lugo, León and Aragón were merged into this one. In 1788, new constitutions were granted, and it was given the name of "Colegio Teólogo de Málaga". It suffered serious damage during the Napoleonic invasion, being set on fire in 1809 and subjected to various sackings. Around 1820, it was the headquarters of a Masonic lodge. In 1836, with the closure of the University of Alcalá, the building remained as a university college until 1843, its last rector being Vicente de la Fuente y Condón.

Afterwards, it served as the Army School of Artillery and Blacksmiths. In 1847 it was restored to be used as an archive, and in 1858, the Madrid City Council remodelled the building to house the second San Bernardino Asylum, for underprivileged girls and old ladies. In 1949, it was transformed into the boarding school "Nuestra Señora de la Paloma", a charitable institution of the Madrid City Council, where children of adolescent age lived. Finally, in 1983, it became the Faculty of Philosophy and Letters of the current University of Alcalá.

In 1998, it became part of a World Heritage Site along with other buildings of the University of Alcalá and the historic centre of Alcalá de Henares.

== Building ==
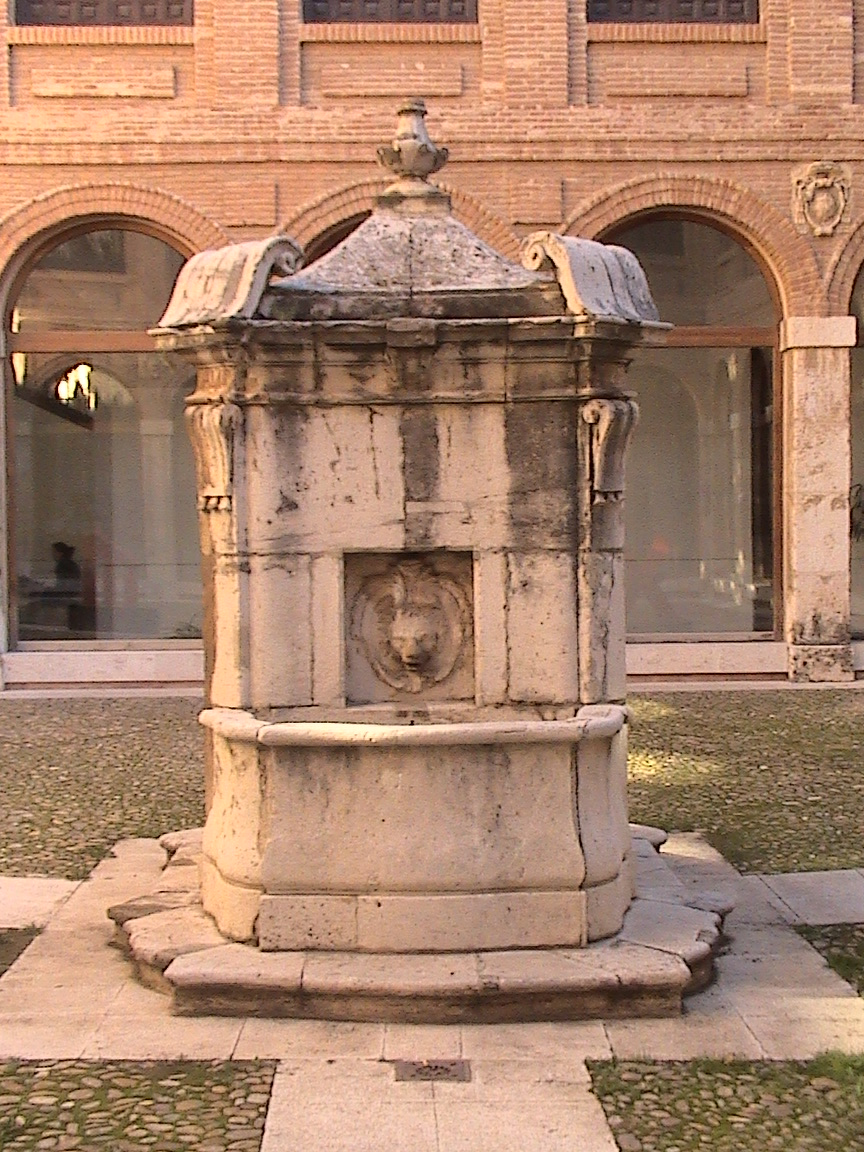
Baroque fountain of the lion's mouth (1769) designed by Miguel de Arteaga.

Of all the minor secular colleges in Alcalá de Henares, it is the most grandiose, and a model of Baroque architecture in Madrid. The building had all the necessary facilities for a college: a library, refectory, chapel with sacristy, spacious rooms for the students and servants, etc.

It is a two-storey building, topped by two beautiful towers, and is enclosed by a large courtyard at the back. The brickwork is built on a continuous plinth of stone ashlars on the façades. The building is organised around two courtyards, separated by a splendid Empire-style staircase topped by an oval dome. In one of the courtyards is a Baroque fountain, completed in 1769 by Miguel de Arteaga.

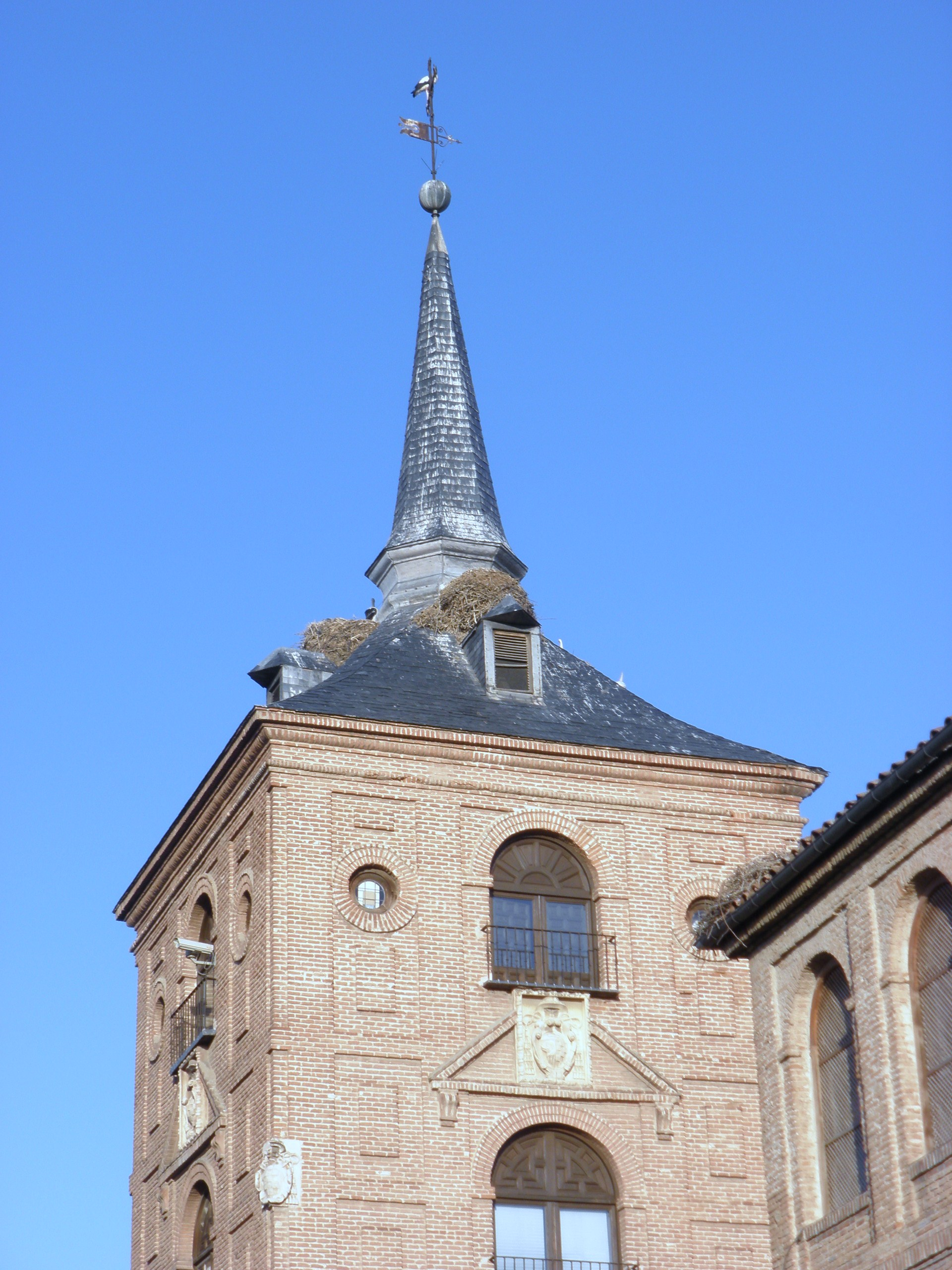
West Tower of the College of Málaga.

Architecturally, it stands out for its façade, two doorways with semicircular arches, and two towers with slate spires in the Madrid style, ornamented with a spire, cross, ball and weathervane. An inscription in Latin runs along the imposts commemorating the founder of the college. Heraldic coats of arms of Bishop Juan Alonso de Moscoso profusely decorate the façade, towers, and courtyards.

== Colegiales ==
=== Clothing ===
The schoolboys wore a black bonnet, a russet or maroon cloak and a purple scholarship.

=== Illustrious Members ===
- Juan de Ortega y Montañés (1627 – 1708) was a Spanish ecclesiastic and colonial administrator.
- Juan Sánchez Duque, head of the bishops who occupied a see in America.
- Domingo de Dutari, priest, member of the Council of State.
- Pedro Díaz de Rojas (1724–1796), abbot of the Magisterial Church of Alcalá de Henares, reformer, and rector of the University of Alcalá.
- Fermín Caballero (1800–1876) on 4 November 1843, signed the order closing the last colleges of the University of Alcalá, including the University of Malaga.
- Vicente de la Fuente (1817–1889) was a Spanish canonist, jurisconsult and historian. He was its last rector, definitively closing the College of Malaga and the University of Alcalá on 4 November 1843.

== See also ==
- History of Alcalá de Henares
- Historical heritage of Alcalá de Henares
- Annex:Alcalá de Henares in the cinema and on television
- Annex:Assets of cultural interest in the Community of Madrid
- Annex:Historic colleges of the University of Alcalá de Henares
- Annex:Buildings in Alcalá de Henares

== Bibliography ==
- Enríquez de Salamanca C. Alcalá de Henares y su Universidad Complutense. Alcalá de Henares: Escuela Nacional de Administración Pública; 1973.
- Casado M. Ilustres colegiales del Colegio Menor de San Ciriaco y Santa Paula o de Málaga: proyección en América de la excelencia académica complutense. IV Centenario del Colegio de Málaga. Alcalá de Henares: Universidad de Alcalá; 2011.
