= Juan Huarte de San Juan =

Spanish physician

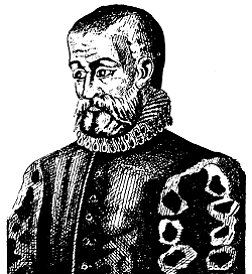
- Juan Huarte de San Juan in a contemporary engraving.
- Born: 1529; Saint-Jean-Pied-de-Port (Lower Navarre)
- Died: 1588 (aged 58–59); Linares
- Education: University of Huesca
- Occupations: Physician and psychologist
- Known for: Examen de ingenios para las sciencias

Juan Huarte de San Juan or Juan Huarte y Navarro (1529 – 1588) was a Spanish physician.

== Life ==
He was born at Saint-Jean-Pied-de-Port (Lower Navarre) toward the end of 1529 or beginning of 1530, and was educated, first, at the university of Huesca. He then went on to the University of Alcalá, where he received his doctorate in medicine in 1560.

Though it appears doubtful whether he practiced as a physician at Huesca, Huarte distinguished himself by his professional skill and heroic zeal during the plague which devastated Baeza in 1566. For a very short period of time, he was appointed doctor by the Cathedral Chapter in 1573. After six months of holding this position, he was fired when he left without permission to request licenses for printing his magnum opus, Examen de ingenios para las sciencias (The Examination of Men's Wits) or "The Examination of Talents for the Professions."

In his personal life, he married a woman named Águeda, and they had three children: Antonia (born between 1568-1576), Águeda, and Luis.

Huarte died in Linares in 1588.

== Work ==
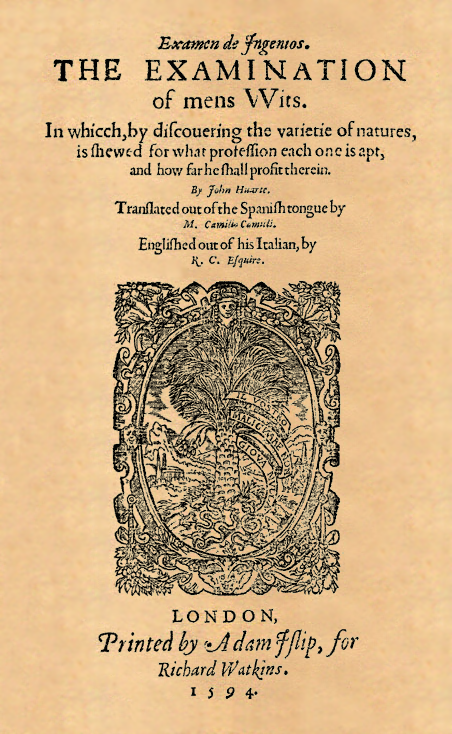
Front page of ″The examination of mens wits″ (edition 1594; first English edition).

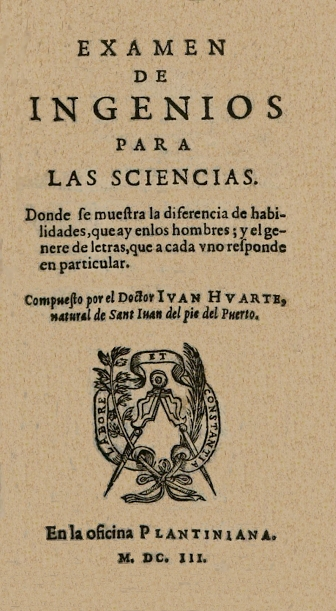
Front page of ″Examen de ingenios para las sciencias″ (edition 1603; first Spanish edition 1575).

Huarte published the first edition of his Examen de ingenios para las ciencias (The Examination of Men's Wits) in 1575, which won him a European reputation, and was translated by Gotthold Ephraim Lessing. Despite its initial proscription by the Inquisition, copies of the Examen were found in many of Barcelona's public and private libraries (including those of Joaquín Setantí, Jeroni Tarrassa, Joan Nadal de Prats, Pau Ignasi de Dalmases and the library of the Jesuit school). Though now superseded, Huarte's treatise is historically interesting as the first attempt to show the connection between psychology and physiology, and its acute ingenuity is as remarkable as the boldness of its views. After his death, a second, revised and expurgated (by the Inquisition) version was published. Between 1575 and 1800, sixty different editions of Examen were published. During the 16th, 17th and 18th century, the Examen was translated into six European languages: French, Italian, English, Latin, German and Dutch. Richard Carew was the translator of Examen de Ingenios into English, basing his translation on Camilli's Italian version. (This book is the first systematic attempt to relate physiology with psychology, though based on the medicine of Galen. Four editions of this translation were published: in 1594, 1596, 1604 and 1616.)

== Theories ==
=== Talent ===
He set forth the following theories in his Examen de ingenios para las ciencias:

First, it is only possible for someone to have a lone talent, rather than multiple talents. Huarte considered this single talent to be differentiated in a high degree, with differentiation between individuals and nations.

Second, it is critical to fulfill a profession that is in agreement with the talent a person possesses.

Third, if the individual is "lacking genius," he or she struggles in a futile way with science.

Finally, each talent is marked by a temperament which is corresponding to the physique of a person. This concept relates to his theory on humoral temperaments.

=== Children ===
In Examen, Huarte discusses the treatment of children as it relates to their abilities. In line with his theory regarding single talents, Huarte believed some children are proficient in one particular area while others are not. Because they have these differences, children should be studied while they are young to ascertain their abilities so they can learn efficiently in the area they excel in. While Huarte wanted children to begin acquiring knowledge related to their talents at a young age, he was aware that the tasks would have to be developmentally appropriate. Applying this, children would learn language earlier and logic when they are older.

=== Humoral Temperaments ===
As mentioned above, Huarte believed that humoral temperaments had an effect on individual differences. He believed that levels of heat, cold, moistness, and dryness would result in these differences. During this time, humoral temperaments were used to explain differences in age, ethnicity, and intellect. However, Huarte applied the idea of humoral temperaments in a different way. He suggested that humoral temperaments had an effect on differences in memory and understanding. In his theory, memory was dependent on moistness while understanding was dependent on dryness. Following his theory, he believed older people had brains that were dry (understanding), but that means the person has a poor memory as well. Children, on the other hand, were believed to have the opposite problem: they had moist brains useful for memory tasks, but were low in understanding because they were lacking dryness. Huarte also stated that for everyone, memory is better in the morning and worsens throughout the day because brains accumulate moisture while sleeping and dry out over the waking hours.

=== Behavior ===
Huarte stressed "somatic determinants of behavior" which originate in the brain. His theory on this combined Greek philosophy with significance placed on the natural determinants of behavior and Christian theology with attention drawn to miraculous enlightenment. His interest in natural determinants of behavior signifies him as a notable pioneer in the field of differential psychology.

=== Gender ===
In keeping with tradition during the time, Huarte did not have positive views toward women. He aided in perpetuating the views related to gender differences by using his theory regarding humoral temperaments. According to Huarte, women could not be blamed for being dull, because they were both cold and dry (a humoral temperamental characterization of their gender). In conjunction with this, Huarte taught that intelligence is stored in the testicles, thus justifying his theory that women are, by nature more stupid than men. Historians can interpret these paternalistic biases coinciding with his desire to understand individual differences as insight into how psychologists shaped and supported social norms during and after their time, and use this knowledge to question other gender-differentiated results.

== Influence ==
In 1983, Huarte de San Juan was named the patron of Spanish psychology by Spain's psychology of decanos (deans). Examen de ingenios para las ciencias has been acknowledged as being a paradigm for organizational psychology, psychological assessment, Cartesian linguistics, and others. It has been suggested by Martín-Araguz that neuropsychologists would find Huarte's work relevant to their field, and that he may have been the founder of neuropsychology. In the sixteenth and seventeenth centuries, Examen was thought of as the best known medical treaty available. His influence can be seen (though not always cited) in the work of Miguel de Cervantes (whose Don Quixote was inspired by him), Francis Bacon, Pierre Charron, Immanuel Kant, Noam Chomsky, Johann Wolfgang von Goethe, David Hume, Montesquieu, Friedrich Nietzsche, Francisco de Quevedo, Jean-Jacques Rousseau, Arthur Schopenhauer, Jakob Thomasius, and Gotthold Ephraim Lessing. Additionally, Huarte's position on women provides support for the suggestion that the Renaissance was a time for men to make intellectual strides, and that women did not have this chance.
