= Blanca de Lizaur =

Investigative journalist and writer

- Born: María Blanca de Lizaur Guerra; 1966 (age 59–60) Ciudad de México, Mexico
- Occupation: Professor, speaker, essayist, researcher
- Period: 1985–2013
- Genre: Scholarly, reference, essay, investigative journalism, non-fiction

Website
- www.bdlizaur.es

Maria Blanca de Lizaur Guerra (born 1966), commonly known as Blanca de Lizaur, is a writer and researcher specialized in cultural studies, communications and literature. She was born in Mexico City, Mexico, to Spanish parents.

She has a doctorate in philology from the Universidad de Alcala in Spain. Her articles have appeared in numerous academic journals, and she has taught and given conferences in Mexico, the United States and Spain.

Blanca de Lizaur is recognized as having made important contributions to the study of the telenovela format, establishing the equivalency of the Latin American telenovela with American soap operas and Canadian téléromans, and about the definition of melodrama. In regard to Literary Theory and Cultural Studies' different schools of thought (and their corresponding theses and antitheses), Blanca de Lizaur is considered to be the first scholar to offer in her work, a structured synthesis (one that encompasses previous scholars' main approaches and contributions, in a meaningful way that responds to reality).

== Career ==
Blanca de Lizaur entered the Universidad Nacional Autonoma de Mexico in 1985 to study Spanish Language and Literature. That same year Televisa organized a national competition for telenovela writers in which she participated and for which she was awarded a scholarship to study the telenovela at Televisa. Thus, in 1986 and 1987 Blanca de Lizaur studied under the guidance of important authors such as Fernanda Villeli, Carlos Olmos, Carlos Tellez and Luis Reyes de la Maza. Upon completing both the telenovela courses and her degree, she decided to devote herself to the study of popular literary products – their aesthetics, their social function, their effects on society, their behaviour as commercial products, as well as to the definition of the telenovela as such, and as a cultural phenomenon. That is how she became a content specialist for media and the internet.

In 1996 her article "La telenovela como literatura popular" (telenovela as popular literature) appeared in a monograph about popular literature published by Ánthropos 166–167, coordinated by María Cruz García de Enterría, renowned for her research into popular works in Spanish Golden Age literature.

In 1997 she was invited to speak about the telenovela in Mexico at the Woodrow Wilson Center, Washington, D.C. In 2002 she was invited as a visiting professor to Stanford University for research purposes. That same year she met Prof. Walter J. Ong (former Modern Language of America president), Saint Louis University, after corresponding for several years.

In 1999, de Lizaur went to Spain to study for her doctorate in philology, under the guidance of María Cruz García de Enterría and Antonio Fernández Ferrer. In 2002 she was awarded a grant from the Fondo Nacional para la Cultura y las Artes (the Mexican National Endowment for the Arts) for postgraduate study abroad. In 2004 she was awarded the Cervantes Grant (Universidad de Alcala and Grupo Santander), coinciding with the 400th anniversary of the publication of Don Quixote.

Her work has been cited in a number of countries.

== Publications ==
Over 25 years of work, Blanca de Lizaur has published numerous articles, conference papers and interviews.

- La telenovela en México 1958–2002: Forma y contenido de un formato narrativo de ficción de alcance mayoritario
- "La telenovela como literatura popular" (id est: Telenovelas as popular literature).
- Teoría literaria de las obras de consumo popular (id est: A literary theory about works created for popular consumption).
- "El arte verbal dominante-no prestigiado y la distinción entre diversos tipos de arte verbal" (id est: Hegemonical yet non prestigious verbal art, and the differences between types of verbal art).
- "El perfil literario del siglo XX: La literatura mexicana 'culta' y los valores de la colectividad" (id est: The literary profile of the 20th Century: High brow (élite) literature and its unique stance in regard to collective values, ideas and beliefs).
- "La literatura marginada: Visión de una forma cultural" (id est: Marginalized literature: A new vision of an ancient cultural phenomenum).
- "La telenovela como melodrama, y su aprovechamiento pedagógico" (id est: Telenovelas as melodrama, and its pedagogical uses).
- "La telenovela y el control de contenidos en la televisión mexicana, desde sus inicios hasta el período de 1984 a 1985" (id est: Telenovelas and content control in Mexican television, since their inception and until the 1984–1985 period).
- "La violencia y los 'medios' de comunicación: Libertad de expresión y [libertad de] recepción" (id est: Violence and the media: Freedom of expression, and freedom of reception).
