= Iñaki Piñuel =

Spanish psychologist (born 1965)

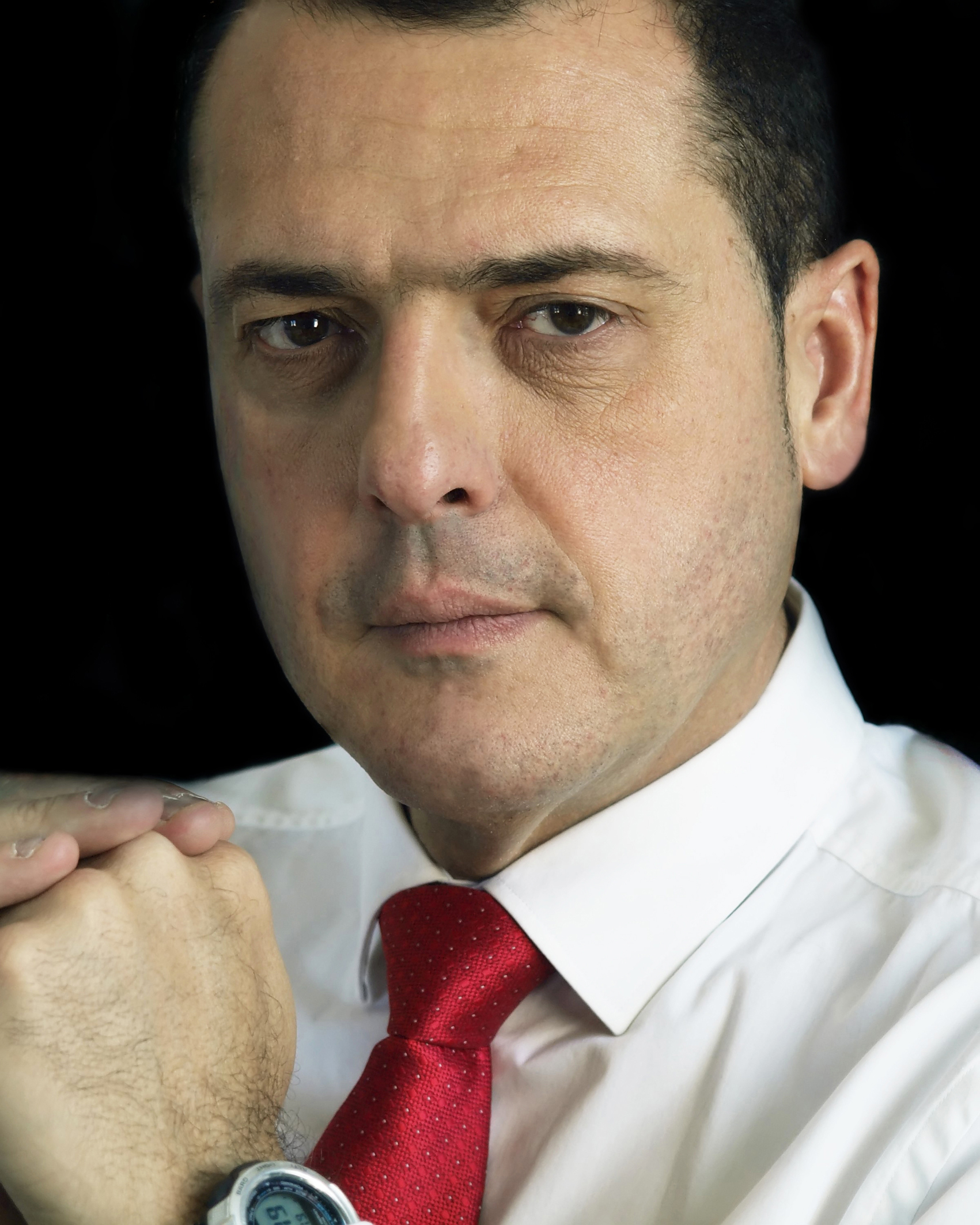
- Born: Iñaki Piñuel y Zabala; 1965 (age 60–61); Madrid, Spain
- Citizenship: Spanish
- Education: University of Alcalá
- Awards: Premio Everis de Ensayo Empresarial
- Scientific career
- Fields: psychology

Iñaki Piñuel y Zabala (Madrid, 1965) is a Spanish psychologist, essayist, researcher and professor of Organization and Human Resources at the Faculty of Business and Labour Sciences in the University of Alcalá, Madrid. He is an expert in Management and Human Resources and one of the leading European specialists in research and divulgation of mobbing or psychological harassment in the workplace and education.

He was director of human resources in various companies in the technology sector. Currently he is a psychotherapist and consultant specializing in this field, consultant and trainer of several agencies, including notably the Instituto Nacional de la Seguridad Social (National Institute of Social Security, (INSS)) and the Consejo General del Poder Judicial (General Council of the Judiciary, (CGPJ)) on psychological violence at work and education.

He is also an Executive MBA from the Instituto de Empresa of Madrid and director of the "Barómetros Cisneros sobre Acoso laboral y Violencia psicológica en el trabajo y Acoso escolar en el entorno educativo" ("Barometers Cisneros on Mobbing and psychological violence at work and Bullying in the educational environment").

He was the author of the first book in Spanish on Mobbing: Mobbing: Cómo sobrevivir al acoso psicológico en el trabajo (Ed. Sal Terrae, 2001).

In 2008 he received the Everis Award on Business Essay for the work: Liderazgo Zero: el liderazgo más allá del poder, la rivalidad y la violencia.

Professor Piñuel on mobbing affected, stated:

Most cases that victims narrate show a perverse and systematic use in our organizations of the scapegoat mechanism by which it is always convenient sacrifice someone, often the most vulnerable, to the harassment of the majority in favor of maintaining the status quo and domination over others. [...] With this grim picture, workers set between them a new pact of mutual indifference that breaks any possibility of organizing collective defense of their right to dignity and health at work. This is how the expected reaction of the workers who witness mobbing is the development of "not me" syndrome.

== Bibliography ==
- Las 100 claves del Mobbing: Detectar y Salir del Acoso Psicológico en el trabajo. Ed. EOS 2018.
- Tratamiento EMDR del Mobbing y el Bullying: una guía para psicoterapeutas. Ed. EOS 2017.
- Las 5 Trampas del Amor: Por qué fracasan las relaciones y cómo evitarlo. Ed. La Esfera de los Libros 2017.
- Cómo Prevenir el Acoso Escolar: Implantación de protocolos Anti Bullying en los centros escolares, una visión práctica y aplicada. Ed CEU 2017.
- Amor Zero: Cómo sobrevivir a los amores psicopáticos. Ed. La Esfera de los Libros. España 2016.
- Amor Zero: Cómo sobrevivir a los amores psicopáticos. Ed SB. Buenos Aires, 2015.
- Por si acaso te acosan: 100 cosas que debes saber para salir del acoso psicológico en el trabajo. Ed Códice. Buenos Aires, 2013.
- Liderazgo Zero: el liderazgo más allá del poder, la rivalidad y la violencia Ed Lid. Madrid, 2009. (Premio EVERIS al mejor ensayo empresarial).
- Mobbing, el estado de la cuestión: Todo lo que usted siempre quiso saber sobre el acoso psicológico y nadie le explicó. Ed. Gestión 2000. Barcelona, 2008.
- La dimisión interior: del síndrome posvacacional a los riesgos psicosociales en el trabajo. Ed. Pirámide. Madrid, 2008.
- Mi jefe es un psicópata: por qué la gente normal se vuelve perversa al alcanzar el poder. Ed. Alienta. Barcelona, 2008.
- Mobbing escolar: Violencia y acoso psicológico contra los niños.Ed CEAC.Barcelona, 2007.
- Neomanagement: jefes tóxicos y sus víctimas. Ed. Aguilar. Madrid, 2004.
- Mobbing: manual de autoayuda. Ed. Aguilar. Madrid, 2003.
- Mobbing: cómo sobrevivir al acoso psicológico en el trabajo. Ed. Punto de Lectura. Madrid, 2003.
- Mobbing: cómo sobrevivir al acoso psicológico en el trabajo. Ed. Sal Terrae. Santander, 2001.
