= Francisco Vallés =

Spanish physician (1524–1592)

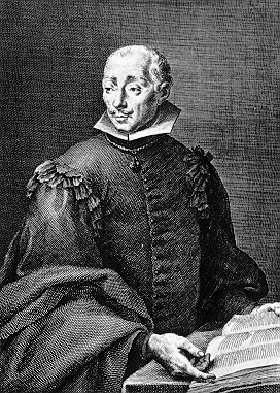
Francisco Vallés according to an eighteenth-century engraving.

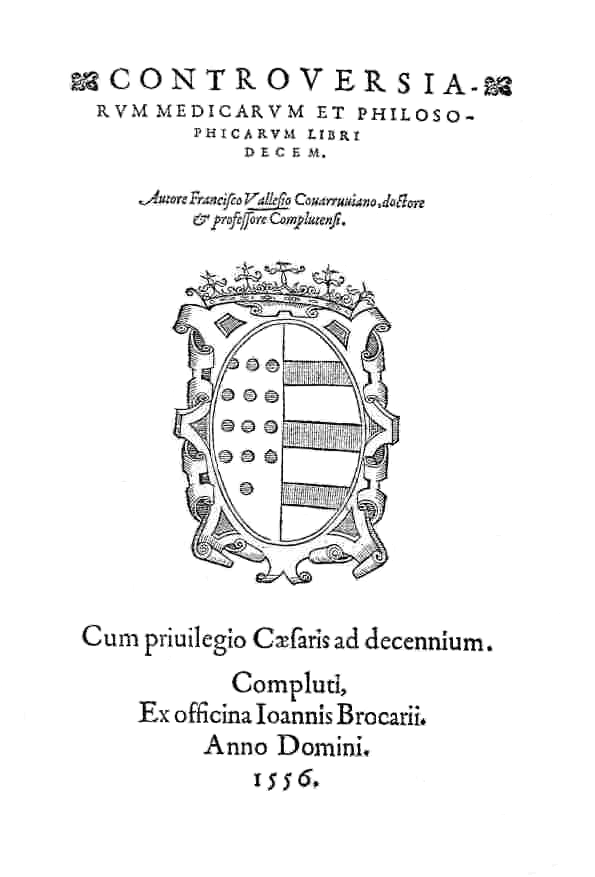
Controversiarum et philosophicarum libri decem (1556).

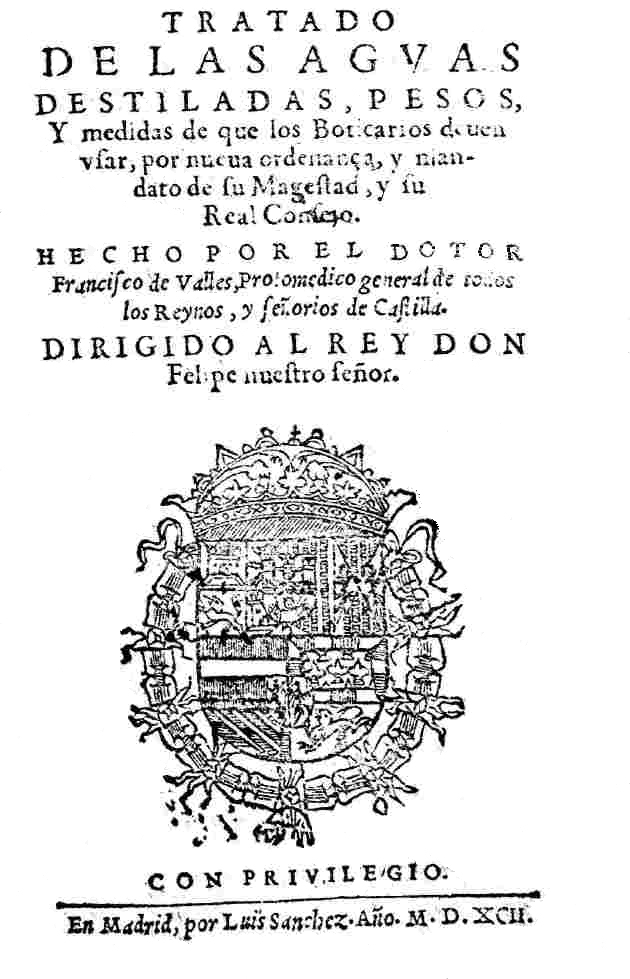
Tratado de las aguas destiladas, pesos, y medidas de que los boticarios deuen usar (1592).

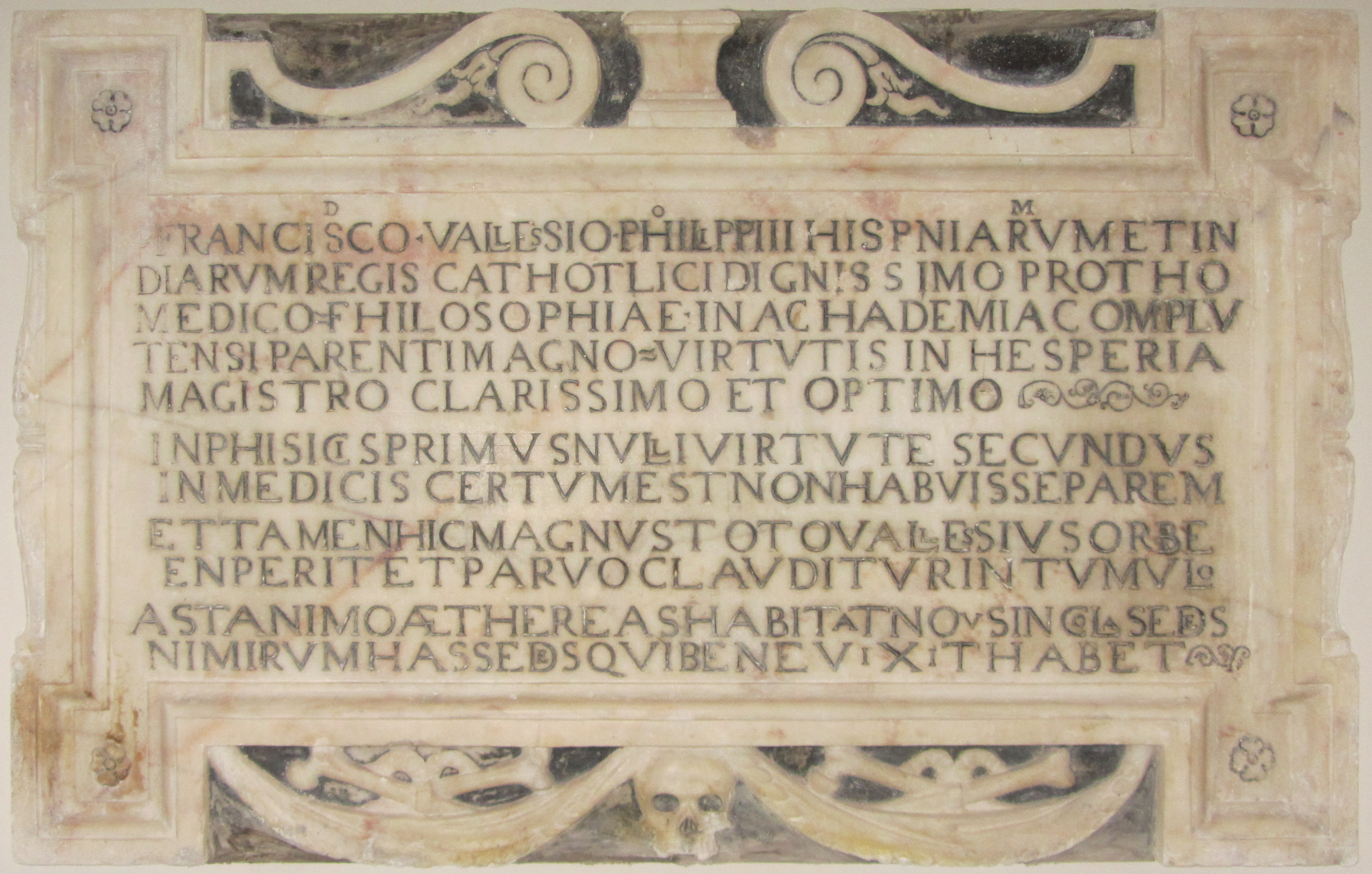
Wall-niche tomb in Alcalá de Henares.

Francisco Vallés also known as Divino Vallés Covarrubias, 4 October 1524 – Burgos, 20 September 1592) was a Spanish physician, the best example of the medical Renaissance in Spain.

== Biography ==
He was born at Covarrubias, and studied in several European cities, which brought him into contact with Andrea Vesalius, the personal physician of King Philip II of Spain and «Médico de Cámara y Protomédico General de los Reinos y Señoríos de Castilla» (chief physician Medical and General Chamber of Kingdoms and Dominions of Castile).

He served most of his life in Alcalá de Henares, where he taught medicine, and was the first in Alcalá to teach medicine for the body.

In addition to medicine Vallés was a great humanist and writer. His last years were spent in the apothecary's Monastery of El Escorial, in which medicines were prepared by distillation of natural plants. He died in Burgos and is buried in the chapel of Colegio Mayor de San Ildefonso in Alcalá de Henares. He was commemorated by the noted Spanish botanists Ruiz and Pavón when they named a South American shrub Vallesia in 1794.

== Books ==
- Controversiarium medicarum et philosophicarum (1556) (2ª ed. 1564) (3ª ed. 1583).
- Commentaria in quartum librum metheoron Aristotelis (1558).
- Claudii Gal. Pergameni De Locis Patientibus Libri Sex (1559).
- In Aphorismos, & libellum de alimento Hippocratis, comentaria (1561).
- Octo librorum Aristotelis de physica doctrina versio recens & commentaria (1562).
- Controuersiarum naturalium ad tyrones pars prima (1563).
- Comentarii de vrinis, pulsibus & febribus (1565) (1569).
- Commentaria in Prognosticorum Hippocratis (1567).
- Galeni ars medicinalis commentariis (1567).
- Comentaria in libros Galeni de differentia febrium (1569).
- Commentaria in libros Hippocratis de Ratione victus in morbis acutis (1569) (1590).
- In libros Hippocratis de morbis popularibus, commetaria (1577) (1588).
- De sacra philosophia. (1587).
- Methodus medendi (1588).
- De vrinis, pulsibus, ac febribus compendiariae tractationes. (1588).
- In aphorismos Hippocratis commentarij VII (1589).
- Tratado de las aguas destiladas, pesos, y medidas de que los boticarios deuen usar. (1592).
- De iis, quae scripta sunt physice in libris sacris siue de sacra philosophia. (1595).
- Sermon predicado en la solemnisima fiesta del Santissimo Sacramento, que se hizo en el Real Convento de San Pablo de Sevilla (1620).

== See also ==
- Alcalá de Henares
- Covarrubias
- Medical history
- General practitioner
- University of Alcalá
