= University of Alcalá =

Public university in Spain

Coordinates: 40.482536°N 3.361151°W

- Universidad de Alcalá
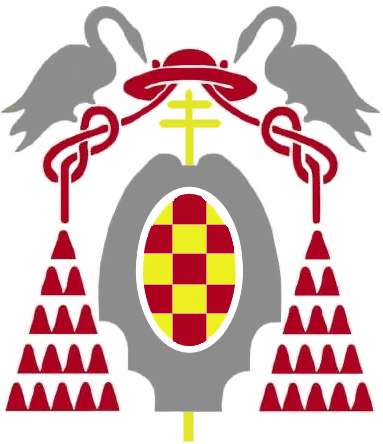
- Other name: UAH
- Type: Public coeducational research
- Established: 1977; 49 years ago
- Academic affiliations: Campus Europae
- Endowment: 160 million EUR
- Chairman: Juan Lladó Arburúa
- President: D. José Vicente Saz Pérez
- Faculty: 1,627
- Administrative staff: 762
- Students: 29,000
- Location: Alcalá de Henares, Madrid, Spain
- Campus: Urban and suburban
- Colors: Blue & white
- Website: www.uah.es

University rankings

Global – Overall
- ARWU World: 701-800 (2025)
- QS World: =697 (2026)
- THE World: 801–1000 (2024)
- USNWR Global: =844 (2023)

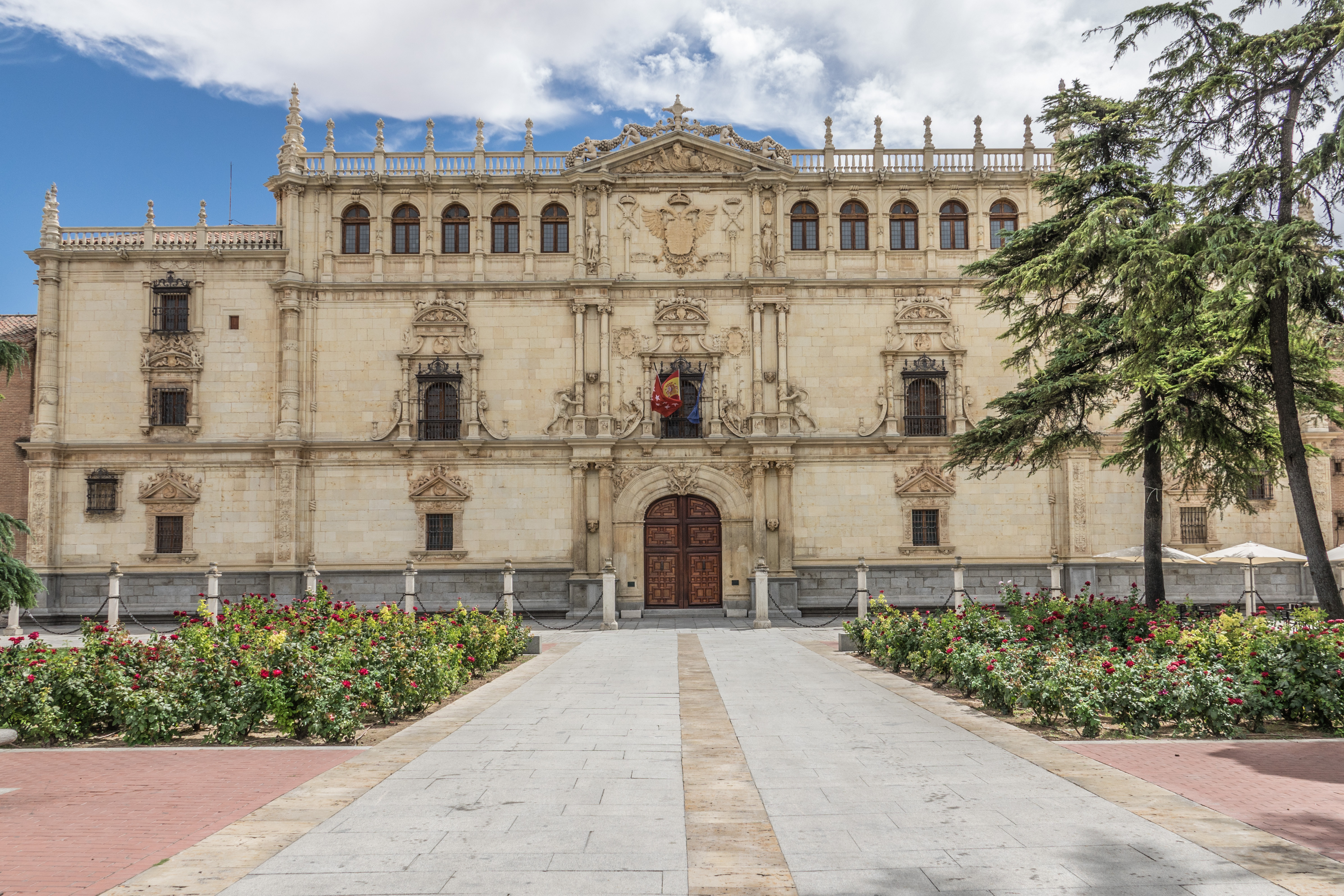
The plateresque facade (R. Gil de Hontañón, 1543) of the most recognized building of the university

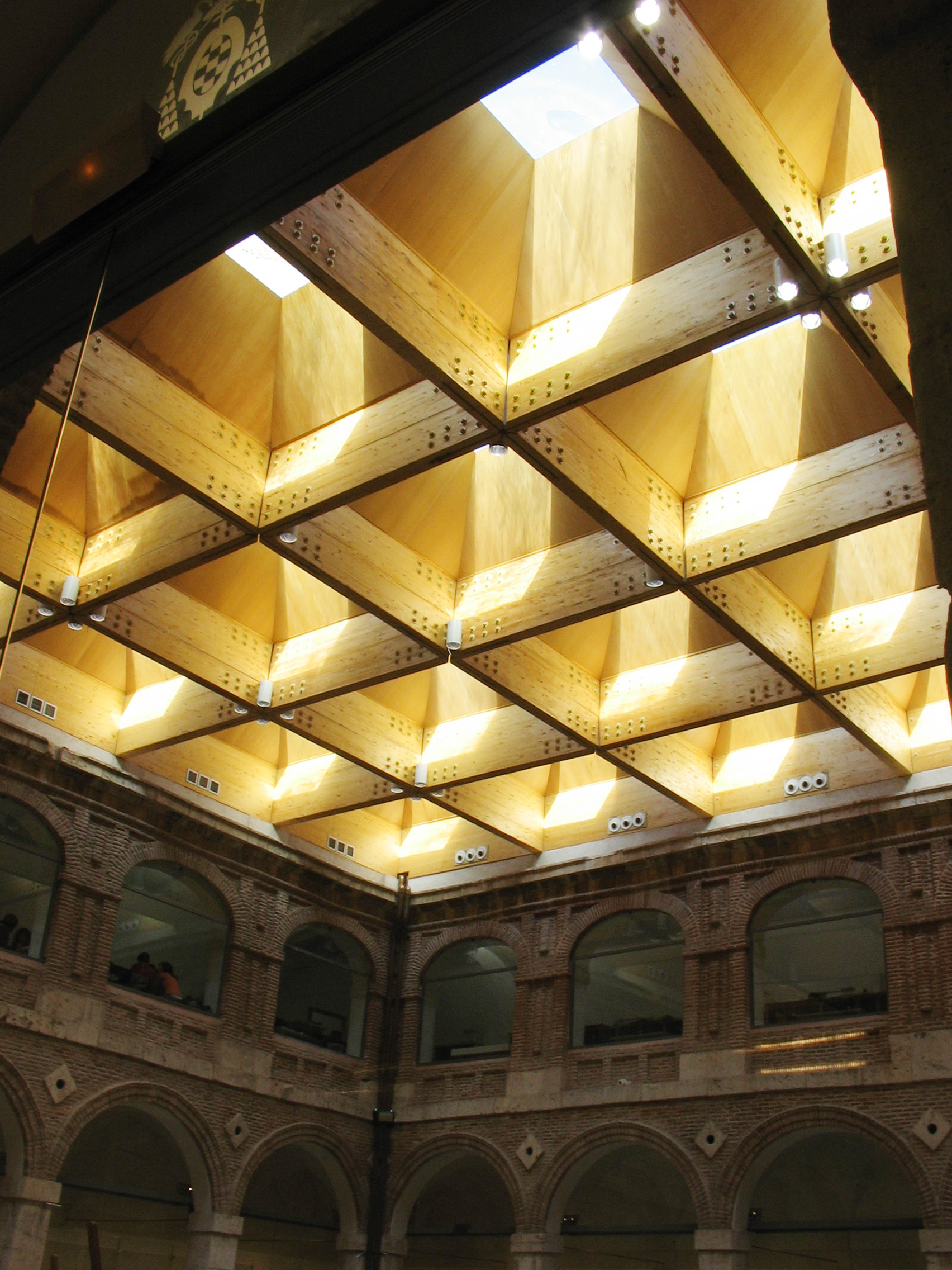
Roofed courtyard of the School of Architecture.

The University of Alcalá (Spanish: Universidad de Alcalá) is a public university located in Alcalá de Henares, a city 35 km (22 miles) northeast of Madrid in Spain and also the third-largest city of the region. It was founded in 1977 as a spin-off from the Complutense University of Madrid (which was founded in Alcalá in 1293 before being moved to Madrid). The University of Alcalá is especially renowned in the Spanish-speaking world for its annual presentation of the highly prestigious Cervantes Prize. The university currently enrolls 28,336 students, 17,252 of whom are studying for undergraduate degrees, who are taught by a teaching staff of 2,608 professors, lecturers and researchers belonging to 24 departments. The administrative tasks are carried out by the university's Administration and Services, comprising approximately 800 people.

One of the university's campuses, located in the city center, is housed partly in historic buildings which were once used by the Complutense University of Madrid, which was located in Alcalá from its medieval origins until it was moved to Madrid in 1836.

== History ==
=== Studium Generale ===
On May 20, 1293, the king Sancho IV of Castile granted license to archbishop of Toledo. Gonzalo Pérez Gudiel to create a Studium Generale (as the university studies were then called through Europe) in Alcalá de Henares, "with the same frankness for teachers and students, which were granted to General Study of Valladolid". These studies, although quite modest, survived through time to link with the Cisneros refoundation. On July 17, 1459 Pope Pius II granted a bull, requested by the archbishop Alfonso Carrillo de Acuña, "for the erection of three Cathedras of Arts and Grammar in this study of Alcalá". These last chatedras, subsisting of that General Study of the 13th century, were integrated by Cisneros into the "new" university.

=== University ===
In 1499, Cardinal Cisneros founded a university in Alcalá de Henares. This university is known in historiography in different ways: Complutense University, Cisneriana University, University of Alcalá ... and reached, together with the University of Salamanca, a pre-eminent place among the Castilian universities during the Golden Age. However, it later entered a period of decline until in 1836 the government decreed its transfer to Madrid, renamed Central University of Madrid. This, in 1970, adopted the name of Complutense University of Madrid. The Complutense University of Madrid, in accordance with such historical trajectory, shows continuity with the university founded by Cisneros in 1499.

=== Move to Madrid ===
By a royal order of 29 October 1836, Queen Regent Maria Christina ordered the university to move to Madrid, where it took the name of Literary University and, in 1851, the Central University of Madrid. The university would be known under this name until its original name of "Complutense" was restored in the 1970s.

=== Restoration ===
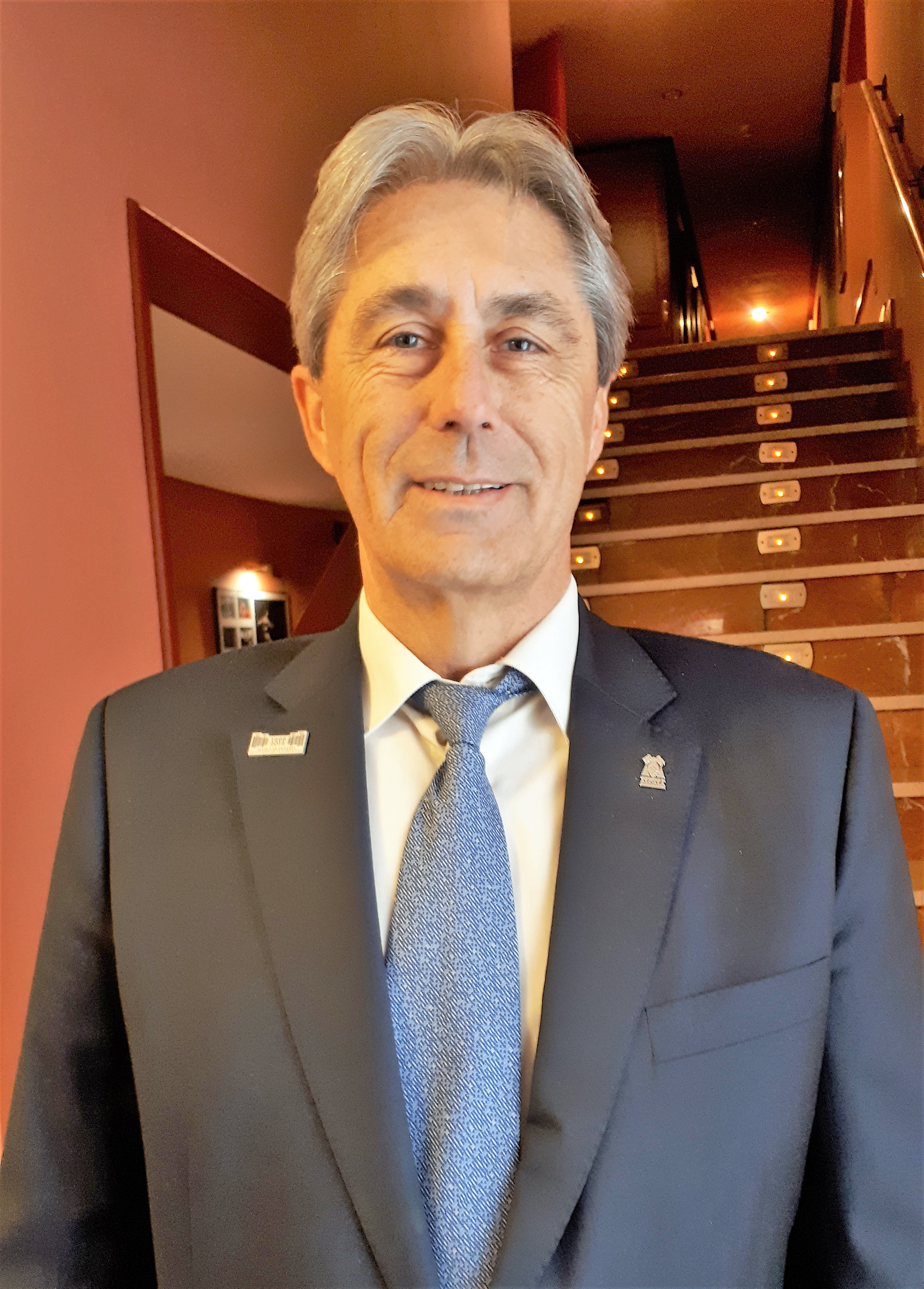
José Vicente Saz Pérez is Rector of the University of Alcalá (2018).

In 1975, after years of the buildings passing between various businesses, Complutense University opened its Alcalá branch as a means to decongest its growing student population. In 1977, the university was re-founded as "the University of Alcalá de Henares," which later was shortened to "the University of Alcalá" in 1996. In 1998 Unesco named it a World Heritage site.

Today's University of Alcalá preserves its traditional humanities faculties to promote and diffuse the Spanish language through both its studies and the Cervantes Prize, which is awarded annually by the King and Queen of Spain in the sixteenth-century Paraninfo (Great Hall). The university has added to its education in the humanities and social sciences new degree subjects in scientific fields such as health sciences or engineering, spread out across its different sites (the Alcalá Campus, the Science and Technology Campus, Guadalajara and Torrejón de Ardoz), all of which, together with the Science and Technology Park, contribute to the university's international profile and the development of the local region.

== Spanish language programs ==
Because of its rich tradition in the humanities, the University of Alcalá offers several programs in Spanish language and literature. Alcalingua, a Department of the University of Alcalá, offers Spanish language and culture courses to foreigners and develops materials for teaching Spanish as a foreign language. The University of Alcalá, together with EDUESPAÑA, grants the CEELE, Certificado de Calidad en la Enseñanza del Español como Lengua Extranjera (Quality Certificate for Teaching Spanish as a Foreign Language).

== International agreements ==
The University of Alcalá is a party to various bilateral agreements with institutions in non-European countries, above all with universities in Latin America and the USA. Some of these agreements stipulate exchanges for first and second stage students. Like Erasmus Programme students, foreign students who take advantage of these exchange schemes are exempt of payment of tuition fees to the University of Alcalá, though they must meet their own costs of travel, accommodation and upkeep. Application to take part in these exchanges should be carried out in the university of origin. Once selected, the university of origin will inform the University of Alcalá.

== Undergraduate studies ==
The University of Alcalá offers degrees in five branches of knowledge: Arts and Humanities, Law and Social Sciences, Sciences, Health Sciences, and Engineering and Architecture. Its approximately 20,000 undergraduate students are spread across its three campuses:

=== Arts & Humanities ===
- Bachelor's Degree in English Studies (Bilingual Spanish-English)
- Bachelor's Degree in Hispanic Studies
- Bachelor's Degree in History
- Bachelor's Degree in Humanities
- Bachelor's Degree in Modern Languages Applied to Translation (Bilingual Spanish-English)
- Bachelor's Degree in Modern Languages Applied to Translation. Guadalajara (Bilingual Spanish-English)
- Bachelor's Degree in English Studies and Modern Languages Applied to Translation
- Bachelor's Degree in Humanities and Primary Education

=== Health Sciences ===
- Bachelor's Degree in Health Biology
- Bachelor's Degree in Medicine
- Bachelor's Degree in Nursing
- Bachelor's Degree in Nursing. Guadalajara
- Bachelor's Degree in Nursing. Torrejón de Ardoz
- Bachelor's Degree in Pharmacy
- Bachelor's Degree in Physical Activity and Sports Sciences
- Bachelor's Degree in Physiotherapy
- Bachelor's Degree in Physiotherapy. Torrejón de Ardoz

=== Architecture & Engineering ===
- Bachelor's Degree in Basics of Architecture and Town Planning
- Bachelor's Degree in Communications Electronic Engineering (Bilingual Spanish-English)
- Bachelor's Degree in Computer Engineering (Bilingual Spanish-English)
- Bachelor's Degree in Computer Science (Bilingual Spanish-English)
- Bachelor's Degree in Construction Engineering
- Bachelor's Degree in Electronics and Industrial Automation Engineering (Partially bilingual Spanish-English)
- Bachelor's Degree in Information Systems (Bilingual Spanish-English)
- Bachelor's Degree in Telecommunication Systems Engineering (Bilingual Spanish-English)
- Bachelor's Degree in Telecommunication Technologies Engineering (Bilingual Spanish-English)
- Bachelor's Degree in Telematics Engineering (Bilingual Spanish-English)

=== Law & Social Sciences ===
- Bachelor's Degree in Accounting and Finance
- Bachelor's Degree in Audiovisual Communication
- Bachelor's Degree in Business Administration and Management
- Bachelor's Degree in Business Administration and Management. Guadalajara
- Bachelor's Degree in Economics
- Bachelor's Degree in Economics and International Business
- Bachelor's Degree in Infant Education
- Bachelor's Degree in Infant Education. Cardenal Cisneros Associated School
- Bachelor's Degree in Infant Education. Cardenal Cisneros Associated School (Bilingual Spanish-English)
- Bachelor's Degree in Law
- Bachelor's Degree in Law and Business Administration and Management
- Bachelor's Degree in Primary Education (Bilingual Spanish-English)
- Bachelor's Degree in Primary Education. Cardenal Cisneros Associated School
- Bachelor's Degree in Primary Education. Cardenal Cisneros Associated School (Bilingual Spanish-English)
- Bachelor's Degree in Social Education. Cardenal Cisneros Associated School
- Bachelor's Degree in Tourism
- Bachelor's Degree in Tourism and Business Administration and Management

=== Sciences ===
- Bachelor's Degree in Biology
- Bachelor's Degree in Chemistry
- Bachelor's Degree in Environmental Sciences
- Bachelor's Degree in Physics and Space Instrumentation
- Bachelor's Degree in Criminology and Forensic Technologies

== Campuses ==
The University of Alcalá has four campuses:

=== The historical campus in the city center ===
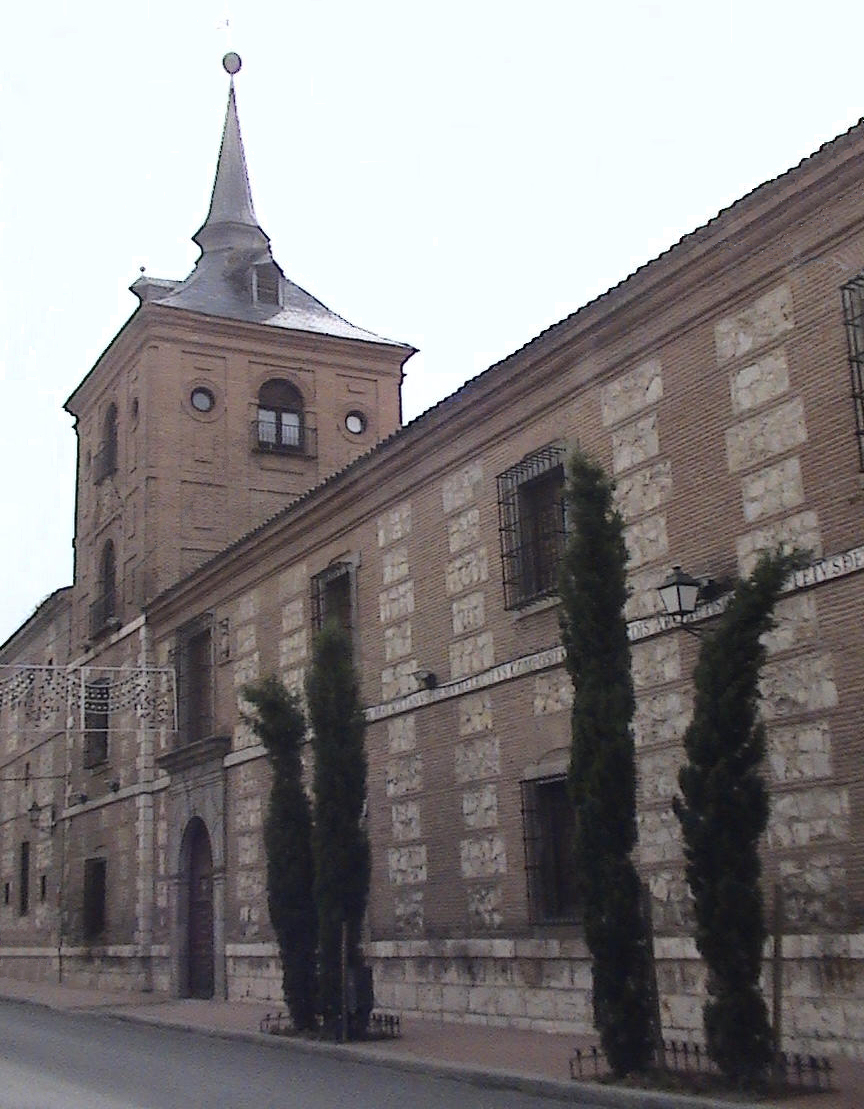
Colegio de Málaga (Faculty of Philosophy and Letters)

This campus occupies, among others, the buildings formerly used by the Universidad Complutense de Madrid when it was itself the Universidad de Alcalá. It includes the main administration building, the Faculties of Philosophy and Arts, Law, Economics and Business, and Documentation, as well as the Technical School of Architecture and Geodesy. Also located in the historical campus are Alcalingua (the university's Spanish language school), the Benjamin Franklin North American Studies University Research Institute, the Research Institute of Economic and Social Analysis, the Police Sciences University Research Institute, the Postgraduate School, the Institute of Educational Sciences, the Cisneros International Center for Historical Studies, the Cervantes Research Center, the Foreign Languages Center, the Institute of Business Organization and Management, the International Financial Training Center Foundation and the General Foundation of the university.

=== The Science and Technology Campus ===
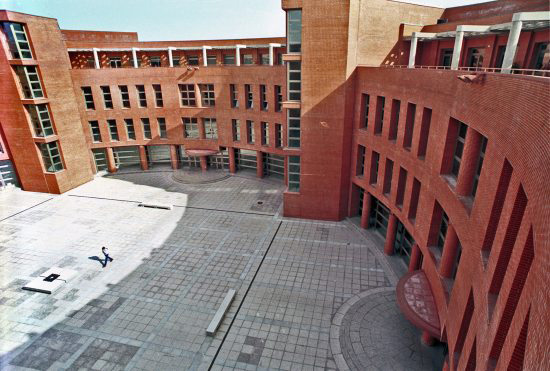
Polytechnic School

This campus includes the Faculties of Biology, Chemistry, Environmental Sciences, Pharmacy, Medicine, Nursing and Physiotherapy, as well as the School of Computer Engineering and the Polytechnic School. The students' Residence Halls (the University Residential City and the Giner de los Ríos University Residence) are also located in this campus, as well as sports facilities, the Botanical Garden, Computer Services, numerous research centers and the Science and Technology Park.

=== Guadalajara Campus ===
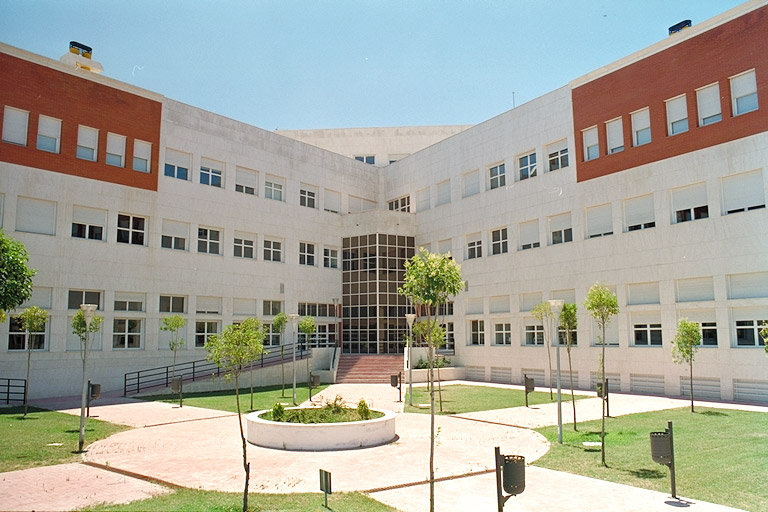
Multidepartamental building

The "Multidepartamental" building is home to the Faculties of Tourism and Nursing, and the Schools of Business Studies and Architecture. The Faculty of Education offers degrees in Audiovisual Communication and Modern Languages and Translation (the latter can also be studied at the historical campus in Alcalá).

=== Torrejón de Ardoz Campus ===
Inaugurated in 2025, is home of studies of Nursing and Physiotherapy. It is located in the town of Torrejón de Ardoz, between Madrid and Alcalá de Henares.

== Doctor Honoris Causa ==
- 1981: Jesús Reyes Heroles
- 1982: Manuel Cobo del Rosal
- 1983: Salvador Jorge Blanco, J. William Fulbright, Luis García de Valdeavellano, Bermudo Meléndez, Ángel Santos Ruiz, Luis Solé Sabaris
- 1992: Horst Albach, Jacques Delors, Werner Maihofer, Iris Murdoch, Andrew V. Schally, Demetrio Sodi Pallarés, Santiago Torres Bernández, Rodrigo Uría González
- 1993: Claudio Boada Villalonga, Luis Ángel Rojo
- 1994: Miguel Delibes, Árpád Göncz, Federico Mayor Zaragoza, Derek Walcott
- 1995: Luzt Birnbaumer, Enrique Fuentes Quintana
- 1996: Yasser Arafat, Louis Vicente Avioli, K. C. Nicolaou, Shimon Peres
- 1997: Louis Lasagna
- 1998: José Botella Llusía
- 1999: Gabriella Morreale
- 2000: José Barluenga, José Elguero, Richard Herr
- 2001: Kofi Annan, Antonio Fernández Alba, Frank Gehry, José Luis Leal Maldonado, Humberto López Morales, Juan Van-Halen Acedo
- 2003: Víctor García de la Concha, Fernando Savater
- 2004: Luis Hernando Avendaño, Luiz Inácio Lula da Silva
- 2005: Juan Ramón de la Fuente, Antonio Mingote
- 2006: Carlos Martínez Alonso, Susumu Tonegawa
- 2007: Ginés Morata
- 2008: Fernando Álvarez de Miranda y Torres, Antonio Fontán Pérez, Santiago Mir Puig, Benzion Netanyahu
- 2010: Samuel G. Armistead, Carlos Fernández-Nóvoa, Miguel León-Portilla, Stephen A. Zeff
- 2011: Luis Miguel Enciso Recio, Enrique Valentín Iglesias García, Gregorio Salvador Caja, José Luis Sampedro Sáez, Joseph Wang
- 2012: John Elliott
- 2013: Francisco Márquez Villanueva, Elisa Pérez Vera, Stephen G. Wozniak

== Notable teachers ==
- Mateo Alemán: Novelist and writer. Studied at Alcalá.
- Joaquín Almunia: is a Spanish politician. He was a teacher in labor law and social security.
- Diego de Argumosa: Surgeon. The first to use ether as an anesthesia in Spain in 1847.
- Vicente Blanco Gaspar, ambassador of Spain.
- Pedro Calderón de la Barca: Studied logic and rhetoric at University of Alcalá.
- Juan Caramuel Lobkowitz: He was a philosopher, mathematician, logician and linguist Spanish Cistercian monk. He studied humanities and philosophy at the University of Alcalá.
- Jaime Castro Castro: Lawyer, writer, politician and statesman in Colombia. Studied at University of Alcalá.
- José Antonio Conde: Orientalist and historian. Educated at the University of Alcalá.
- Juan Ginés de Sepúlveda: Humanist, philosopher and theologian. Studied at University of Alcalá Arts and Theology.
- Paúl Granda López: Mayor of the City of Cuenca (Ecuador). Studied at the University of Alcalá.
- Juan Huarte de San Juan: Physician and psychologist. Received his doctorate in medicine in Alcalá de Henares.
- Melchor de Liñán y Cisneros: Studied Arts and Theology. Cisneros chose him to teach theology for 20 years.
- María Blanca de Lizaur Guerra: Works as a researcher specializing in cultural studies, communication, literature and as a writer. Holds a Ph.D. in philology from the University of Alcalá.
- Ignatius of Loyola: Studied theology and Latin in the University of Alcalá.
- Juan de Mariana: Jesuit priest, Scholastic, historian, and member of the Monarchomachs. Studied Arts and Theology at the University of Alcalá.
- Gaspar Melchor de Jovellanos: Author, philosopher and statesman.
- Francisco de Mendoza y Bobadilla: Studied Latin, Greek and Hebrew at the University of Alcala.
- Tirso de Molina: Studied at Alcalá de Henares, was a Spanish Baroque dramatist, a poet and a Roman Catholic monk.
- Arias Montano: orientalist and editor of the Antwerp Polyglot.
- Francisco Moreno Fernández: Professor of Spanish language. He was Director of Cervantes Institute in São Paulo and Chicago.
- Antonio de Nebrija: Professorship of poetry and grammar at University of Alcalá, best known for writing a grammar of the Castilian
- Antonio Pérez: Statesman, secretary of King Philip II of Spain. Attended the most prestigious universities such as Alcalá de Henares.
- Iñaki Piñuel: Professor of Organization and Human Resources
- Francisco de Quevedo: Poet and politician.
- Andrés Manuel del Río: Scientist and naturalist. Studied at University of Alcalá de Henares and discovered compounds of vanadium.
- Francisco Vallés de Covarrubias: "Divino Vallés" Professor of medicine. The first in Alcalá to teach medicine for the body. He is buried in the chapel of Colegio Mayor de San Ildefonso in Alcalá de Henares.
- Lope de Vega: Playwright and poet.
- Pedro Ciruelo: Mathematician, theologian, and astrologer.

== Facilities and other services ==
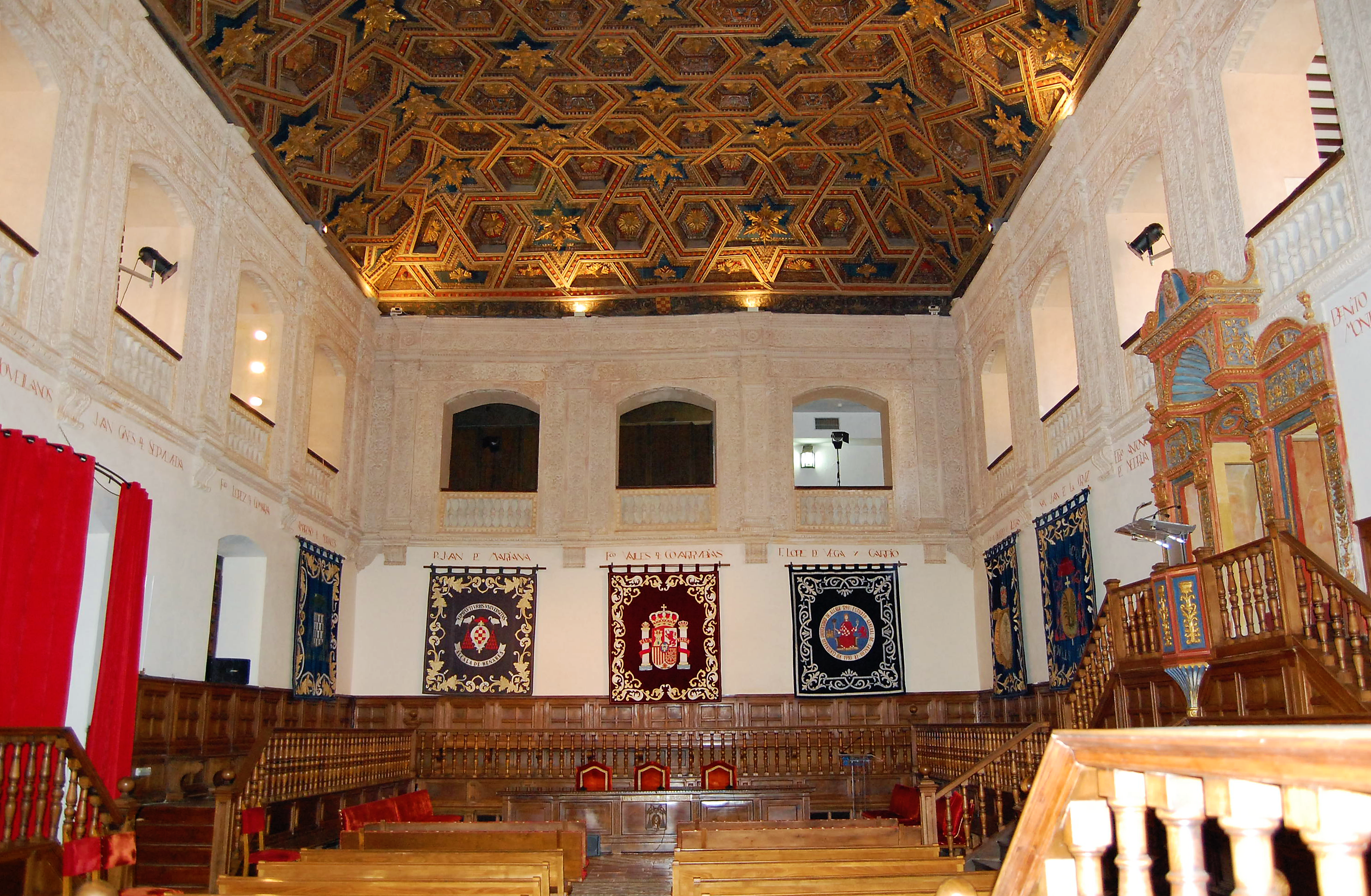
Auditorium of the University of Alcalá.

The University of Alcalá is spread across three main sites:

- The renovated 16th and 17th century buildings located in the city centre of Alcalá de Henares are home to studies in the traditional fields of Humanities, Social Sciences and Law, as well as to the School of Architecture.
- Health Sciences, specialised experimental sciences, and the new technologies are found in faculties and university schools built from scratch on the campus just outside the city of Alcalá de Henares.
- Part of its recent process of expansion, the development of the Guadalajara Campus deserves special mention. Here, as well as the long-standing Escuela de Magisterio (primary education teacher-training college) and the Castilla-La Mancha Health Service Nursing College, both attached to the university, may be found the Multi-departmental Building, which is home for Technical Architecture, Business Science, and Tourism.

The University of Alcalá has a network of 14 libraries spread across its three campuses. They offer extended hours year-round and during exam periods they never close.

The university also offers a wide range of sporting activities, including aikido, archery, badminton, fencing, rugby and yoga. There are also courses in snorkelling, horseriding and mountaineering, as well as other popular sports such as football.

The university has a hall for music, dance, theatre or flamenco, as well as the university choir, "La Tuna" (a traditional student music group), and the Film Club.

== Architecture ==
Many buildings on the campus of Texas Tech University in Lubbock, Texas borrow architectural elements from those found at the University of Alcalá.

== See also ==
- List of medieval universities
- Complutensian Polyglot Bible
- University of Alcalá (1499–1836)
