= Gabriella Morreale de Escobar =

Italian scientist and chemist

Gabriella Morreale de Escobar (7 April 1930 – 4 December 2017) was an Italian-born Spanish chemist who specialised in the thyroid. She and her husband Francisco Escobar del Rey showed that thyroid hormones cross the placenta during pregnancy and are essential for fetal brain development. She established a national newborn screening program for congenital hypothyroidism in Spain and helped to introduce iodised salt to prevent thyroid problems caused by iodine deficiency.

== Biography ==
Morreale was born in 1930 in Milan, Italy. Her father, Eugenio Morreale, was a Sicilian biologist and diplomat, and her mother, Emilia de Castro, was a biologist and a curator for the Museo Civico di Storia Naturale di Milano (Milan Natural History Museum). She attended schools in Vienna, Austria and Baltimore, United States, before finishing the Baccalaureate in Málaga, Spain. She studied chemistry at the University of Granada, earning a doctoral degree. Her doctoral thesis showed that the incidence of endemic goitre in the Alpujarras region was closely linked to iodine deficiency. In 1953, she married Francisco Escobar del Rey, with whom she would collaborate for the rest of her scientific career.

Morreale and Escobar travelled to Leiden, the Netherlands, to perform post-doctoral research on thyroid hormone metabolism using radioisotopes of iodine. They returned to Spain in 1958 and began working in the Spanish National Research Council. From 1963 to 1975, she led the thyroid studies division of the Gregorio Marañón Health Research Institute in Madrid. In 1974, Morreale and Escobar became employed by the Autonomous University of Madrid, where they co-founded the Instituto de Investigaciones Biomedicas. Morreale's early research demonstrated through animal studies that thyroxine (T4) is converted to triiodothyronine (T3), and she developed sensitive radioimmunoassays for the detection of T3 and T4. She showed that, in pregnant women, maternal thyroid hormones are transferred via the placenta to the fetus and maternal-fetal transfer of T4 is important for fetal brain development. She implemented a national newborn screening program for congenital hypothyroidism in Spain and her research led to the introduction of iodised salt in Spain to prevent endemic goitre caused by iodine deficiency.

Morreale was a co-founder of the European Thyroid Association and served as its president from 1978 to 1980. She was awarded an honorary doctorate in medicine from the University of Alcalá in 2001 and became an honorary member of the European Society of Endocrinology in 2008. She died on 4 December 2017 at 87 years old.
