= Joaquín Setantí =

Spanish philosopher and writer (1540-1617)

Joaquín Setantí y Alcina (c. 1540 – 1617) was an important figure in the municipality of Barcelona at the beginning of the seventeenth century. He contributed several monographs to the movement known as tacitism including Frutos de historia (1590). His collection of moral aphorisms, Centellas de varios conceptos (1614), stands out, due to its originality. Setantí was a precursor of Baltasar Gracián and of the other great cultivators of aphorisms during the Spanish Baroque. His 500 dense Centellas (sparks) are said to "reveal a modern political and personal attitude that marks an important milestone in Spanish sententious literature".
