= Colegio Mayor de San Ildefonso =

Cultural property in Alcalá de Henares, Spain

- Colegio Mayor de San Ildefonso (Spanish)
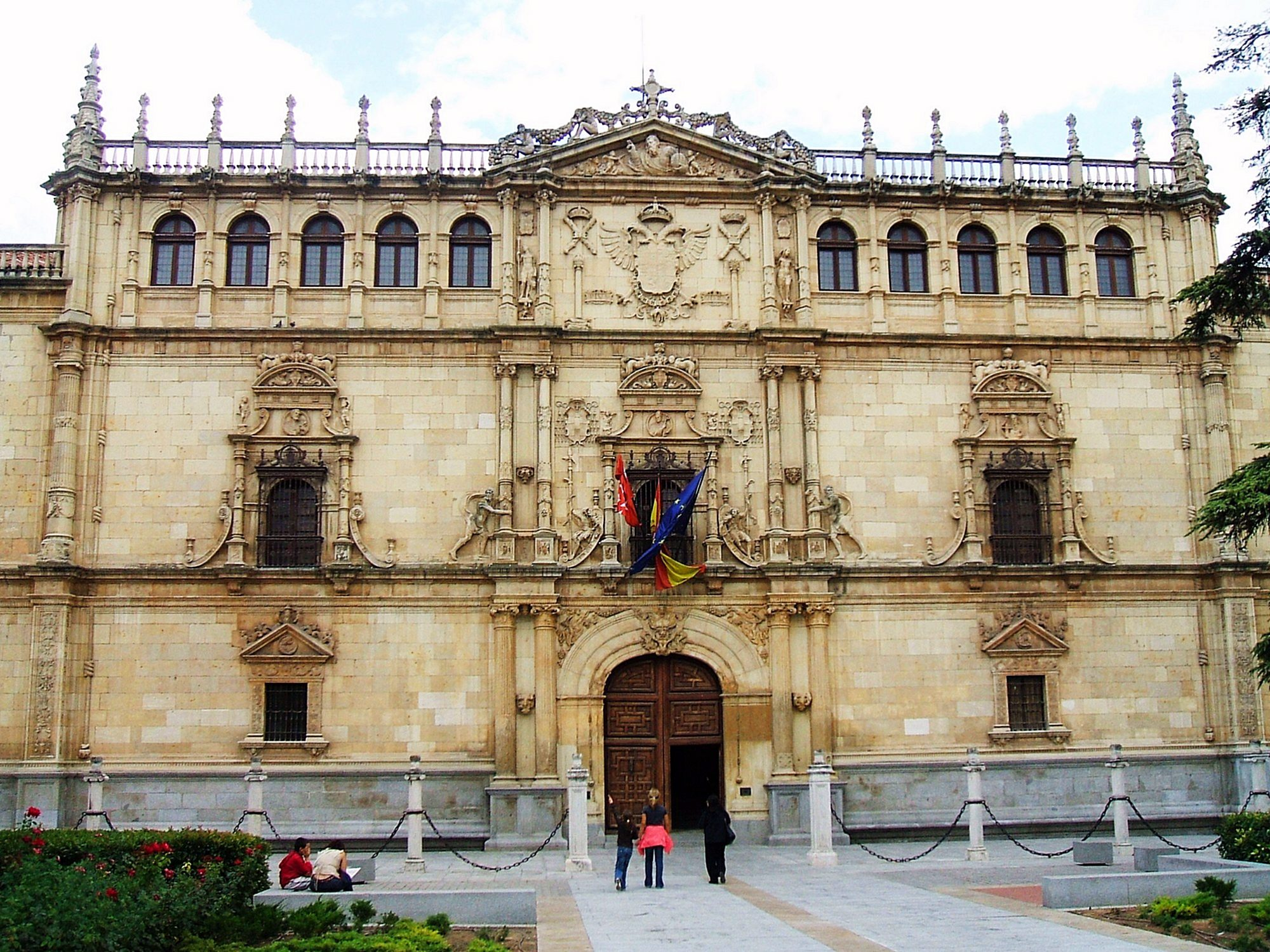

- Location within Spain
- 40.482855°N 3.363075°W
- Location: Alcalá de Henares, Spain

Spanish Cultural Heritage
- Official name: Colegio Mayor de San Ildefonso
- Type: Non-movable
- Criteria: Monument
- Designated: 1914
- Reference no.: RI-51-0000132

The Colegio Mayor de San Ildefonso (Spanish: Colegio Mayor de San Ildefonso) is a building located in Alcalá de Henares, Spain. It was declared Bien de Interés Cultural in 1914.

It was built by Cardinal Cisneros who commissioned architect Pedro de Gumiel to design. The foundation stone was laid in 1499, the Saint Ildefonsus` Chapel was completed in 1510; in 1516 began construction of the Paraninfo (Auditorium) and in 1537 Rodrigo Gil de Hontañón designed the main façade.

Although most of the work had been carried out by 1617 when Juan Gómez de Mora redesigned the courtyard (Thomas of Villanova's courtyard), the construction was not finished until the second half of the 17th century.
