= Pedro Ciruelo =

Spanish philosopher (c.1465-1548)

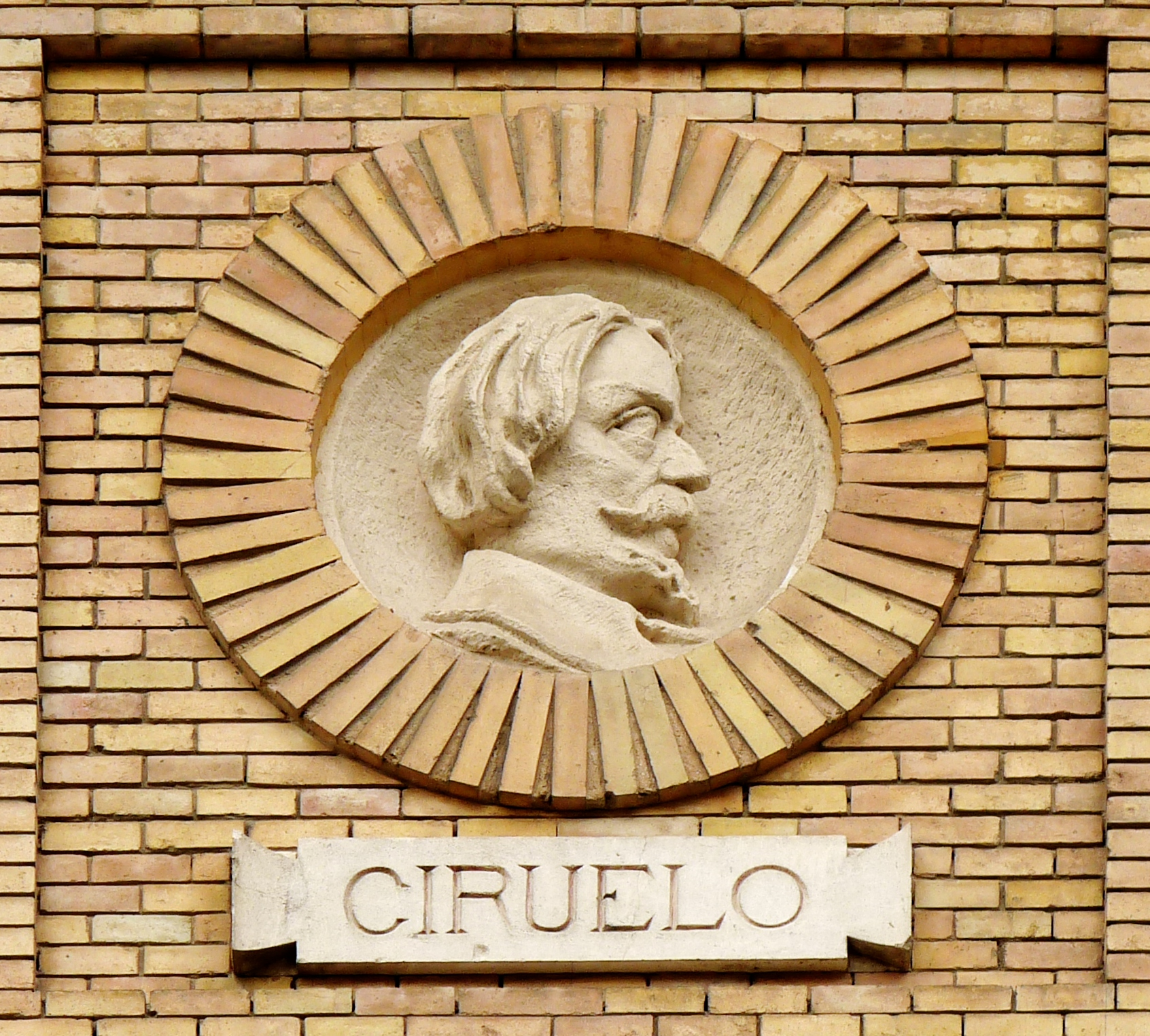
Memorial relief at the Faculty of Medicine in Zaragoza

Pedro Sánchez Ciruelo (c. 1465 – 1548) was a Spanish philosopher, theologian, mathematician, astrologer, astronomer and writer on topics of natural philosophy.

== Early life ==
Ciruelo was born somewhere between 1460 and 1470 in Daroca, Spain. Ciruelo was born in the kingdom of Aragon where Daroca held political, military, and administrative significance for the kingdom. He came from a family of Jews and Judaizers according to papers that traced his genealogy during the Spanish Inquisition. Ciruelo claimed to be an orphan, but the validity of this claim is not well-supported as Ciruelo had living relatives and received an education which was costly at the time. This claim may have been used to distance himself from his Jewish ancestry because his grandfather, Francisco Sánchez Ciruelo, was condemned for apostasy, and an uncle, Bartolomé, was a confeso who confessed to reverting from Catholicism to Jewish beliefs. His family is not thought to have been wealthy as several members worked in common trades like shoe-making or meat cutting.

== Education and career ==
Ciruelo first studied grammar and rhetoric at Daroca's Studium Artibus, which made him interested in scholarship. He went on to study at the University of Salamanca in 1482 where he found an interest in logic and mathematics. During his time at the University of Salamanca, Ciruelo gained new interests in astronomy and astrology after developing a great appreciation for Abraham Zacuto's works on the subjects.

Professors at the University of Salmanca went on to use Zacuto's work after he left the university, and continued to influence Ciruelo's education. He admired Rodrigo Vasurto, the chair of astrology at Salamanca. Zacuto and Vasurto are mentioned in future texts that he went on to write. He then studied theology at the University of Paris, living there for ten years during which he, along with Juan Martinez Siliceo, Gaspar Lax, Miguel Francés, Jacobo Ramírez, and Alfonso Osorio became part of a circle of Spanish calculatores interested in mathematical physics and the works of Oxford Calculatores. Here, together with Jacques Lefèvre d’Étaples, Ciruelo helped to standardize the mathematics curriculum at the university.

Ciruelo also published a number of books during his tenure through the French printer and publisher Guy Marchant. He returned to Spain in 1502 and taught philosophy at the Colegio de San Antonio de Portaceli in Sigüenza and later at the University of Zaragoza. In 1509, he moved to the University of Alcalá to teach theology and mathematics—among his students being Domingo de Soto. In 1533 he moved to Segovia, where he served at the city's Cathedral until 1537. He later moved back to Salamanca where he continued to write until his death.

== Works and beliefs ==
Ciruelo wrote a commentary on the Sphaera de Sacrobosco, and on Thomas Brawardine's mathematical works Arithmetica Speculativa and Geometria Speculativa, among others. These commentaries and those of other calculatores would become standard textbooks in many European universities, helping to solidify Paris' role in the 15th-century mathematics book market.

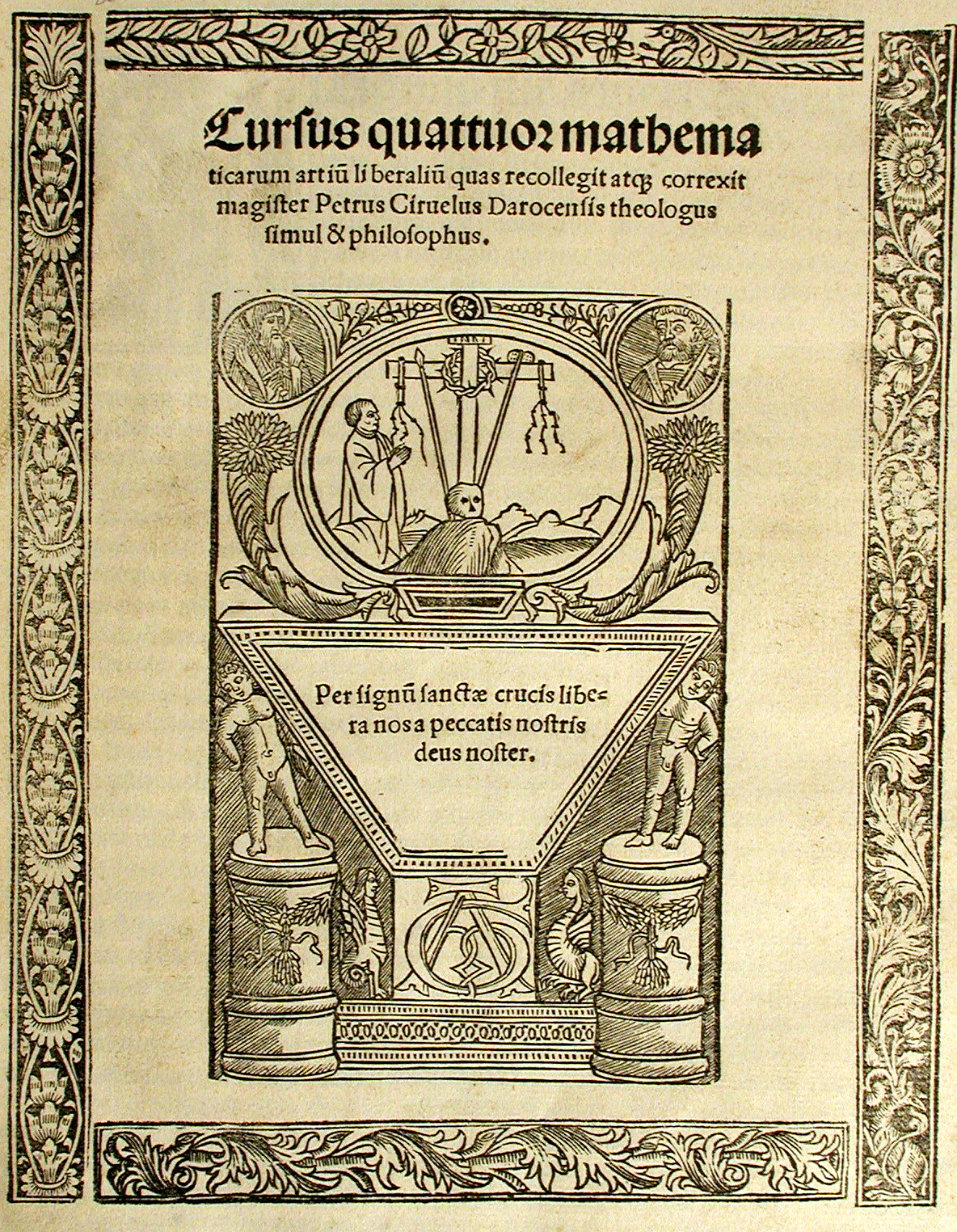
Cover Page of Cursus quattuor mathematicarum artium liberalium (1516)

=== Mathematics program ===
Although there is little administrative evidence of Ciruelo in Paris, Ciruelo and Jacques Lefèvre d'Étaples are considered to be responsible for the expansion of mathematical teaching in Paris in the late 1400s. At the time there was no standardized curriculum for mathematics at the University of Paris. In the late 1400s Ciruelo and Lefèvre each had their own advanced mathematical programs for the university. Ciruelo's program used 5 different mathematical texts on "theoretical arithmetic, practical arithmetic, geometry, and astronomy".

Although Ciruelo was called a "lecturer of mathematics" in Thomas Bradwardine's Arithmetic speculativa, it is unclear whether Ciruelo actually taught at the University of Paris because there was no position with that title during the time. During his time in Paris, Ciruelo wrote 4 mathematical books: two of them being new editions of Thomas Bradwardine's texts, 1 being an original publication, and finally a commentary of Sacrobosco's Sphaera. Ciruelo's works were not as well developed as his contemporaries. His works often did not follow standard mathematical programs, and his books were published in different formats. Ciruelo published his works from Guy Marchant’s workshop. Marchant was particularly interested in Ciruelo works because of his academic background and appreciation for illustrated works. Printing Ciruelo’s works soon became a problem because of the technical limitations at the time. Printers would have to obtain special printing equipment to reproduce a variety of mathematical figures and Arabic numbers.

=== Cursus ===
In Ciruelo's work the Cursus quattuor mathematicarum artium liberalium, he examines why the adjectives "arithmetical" and "geometrical" to are used to describe and name progressions, sequences, and proportions. Ciruelo is one of few known sources discussing this history. Although one might assume that arithmetic progressions or geometric sequences are named so because of the respective branch of mathematics they are used in, Ciruelo argued differently. He believed that these terms were used to emphasize the process of measurement inherent to such mathematics. This view is supported by Aristotle's use of the term "geometrical proportion" to refer to the metric information contained in mathematical ratios.

On the topic of proportions, Ciruelo's four part Cursus also contains a treatise on music theory. These writings were exemplary of the "arithmetization of geometry" taking place in mathematics during the 16th century. That is, they represent a shift towards proving geometric theorems solely algebraically, choosing to treat geometric objects as abstract algebraic symbols, rather than physical items in space. The subtle emphasis on the algebra being a "symbol" is dropped in this time period, such that the symbol and the geometric object represented by it are viewed as one and the same. This was of great relevance to music theory, as it is by nature intrinsically geometric, involving the division of strings into intervals. Ciruelo's work is able to explain such concepts without reference to physical, geometric strings. For example, he describes a method with which to break compound intervals down into the sum of smaller intervals solely using numeric ratios. This level of abstraction outlined by Ciruelo and other 16th-century scholars is credited with providing a "better approach to equal temperament [tuning]" within this time period.

=== Astrology ===
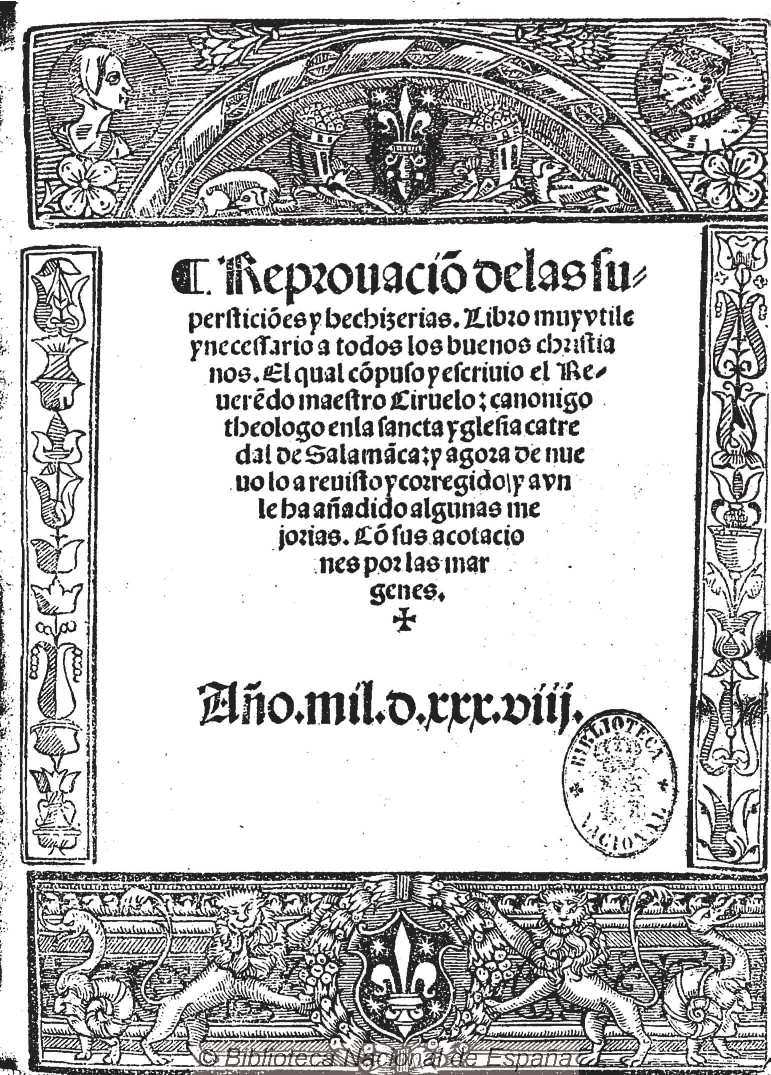
Cover Page of Reprobación de supersticiones y hechizerías (1538)

His main astrological work Apotelesmata astrologiae Christianae was published in 1521, in which he argued that only those equally versed in theology and astrology, like himself, were qualified to pass judgement on the subject. Ciruelo believed that knowing the cosmos was a way of admiring God's creation, but was also opposed to certain beliefs, and in his 1538 book Reprobación de supersticiones y hechizerías he defined a metric to determine which kinds of astrological practices were legitimate and which were superstitious. He condemned the belief in the evil eye, dream divination, and the use of amulets, horoscopes and rain making, but considered the flights of witches to be real. To him, any practice claiming to change future events was illegitimate. Ciruelo also considered most Arabic astrological traditions to be blasphemous, accusing such practices of "corrupting" Ptolemy's ancient astrological treatise Tetrabiblos. He advocated for a restoration of Ptolemaic astrology.

==== Natural, preternatural and supernatural ====
Many of Ciruelo's astrological arguments were justified by his religious beliefs, which are detailed in the Reprobación de supersticiones y hechizerías. This was deliberate, as the study of astrology was at the center of a theological debate in the 16th century. Any astrological practice trying to achieve supernatural feats was seen as infringing on the domain of the divine, constituting heresy. Thus, the question of what feats were humanly possible and what were divine was critical to astrologists at the time, so that the field could be reformed and redeemed in the eyes of Inquisitors.

During the 16th century, followers of Christianity believed in three different explanations for the possible. These were the natural, preternatural, and supernatural orders. Ciruelo summarizes these orders from a cosmological standpoint.

- The supernatural order refers to events caused by God's intervention, which take the form of miracles. As Ciruelo puts it, "[the supernatural] comes from God, who operates miraculously on the course of nature".
- The preternatural order refers to events caused by the intervention of spirits, demons, and angels in the natural world. These entities were created by God and, although having supernatural powers, were still considered natural beings. This combination of the natural and the supernatural necessitates a middle ground between them: the preternatural.
- The natural order refers to events caused by beings and materials in the 'sublunar sphere' -- that is, here on earth. According to Ciruelo, the third order usually takes the form of actions committed by free-willed, living creatures.

Ciruelo believed that these three orders were the only categories needed to explain events on earth. The natural and supernatural orders were originally proposed by Anselm of Canterbury, but Ciruelo eventually added the preternatural order, seeing it to be a natural consequence of the other two. This extra distinction between the natural and the supernatural outlined the futility of superstitious rituals, in Ciruelo's view. Rituals seeking to accomplish preternatural feats would, by nature of being an invented by humanity, never be able to come to fruition without the help of some preternatural or supernatural power.

It is for these reasons that the only astrology Ciruelo considered to be "legitimate" was "natural astrology;" that is, the astrological practices that respected the boundary between the natural and the preternatural.

== Publications ==
- 1495. Arithmetica speculativa Thome Bravardini bene revisa et correcta a Petro Sánchez Ciruelo Aragonensi mathematicas legente. Paris: Guy Marchand. (reprinted Paris, 1502).
- 1495. Geometría speculativa Thome Bravardini. Paris: Jean Petit. (reprinted 1502, 1508, 1511, 1530).
- 1495. Tractatus Arithmeticae Practice qui dicitur algorismus. Paris: Guy Marchand. (reprinted 1502, 1505, 1509, 1513, 1514).
- 1498. Uberrimum sphere mundi comentum intersertis etiam questionibus domini Petri de Aliaco. Paris: Jean Petit.
- 1508. Uberrimum Sphere mundi commentum. Johannis de sacro busto anglici, una cum textualibus optimisque additionibus ac uberrimo commentario Petri Ciruelli; intersertis etiam questionibus domini Petri de Aliaco. Paris: Jean Petit.
- 1515. Habes lector Iohannis de sacro busto sphere textum una cum additionibus non aspernandis Petri Ciruelli. D. Paris: Jean Petit.
- 1516. Cursus quattuor mathematicarum artium liberalium. Alcalá: Arnaldo Guillén Brocar. This work was reprinted in Alcalá in 1526 and 1528.
- 1519. Prima pars logices ad veriores sensus textus Aristotelis. Alcalá: Arnaldo Guillén Brocar.
- 1521. Apotelesmata astrologiae Christianae. Alcalá de Henares: Juan de Eguía.
- 1526. Opusculum de sphera mundi Joannis de sacro busto: cum additionibus: et familiarissimo commentario Petri Ciruelli Darocensis: nunc recenter correctis a suo autore: intersertis etiam egregijs questionibus domini Petri de Aliaco. Alcalá de Henares: Miguel de Eguía.
- 1528. In Posteriora analytica commentarius. Alcalá: Miguel de Eguía. (two new editions in 1529).
- 1538. Reprobación de supersticiones y hechicerías. Medina del Campo: Guillermo de Millis. (reprint in 1551)
