= Holy Trinity Church (Hrastovlje) =

Coordinates: 45°30′34.83″N 13°54′6.7″E

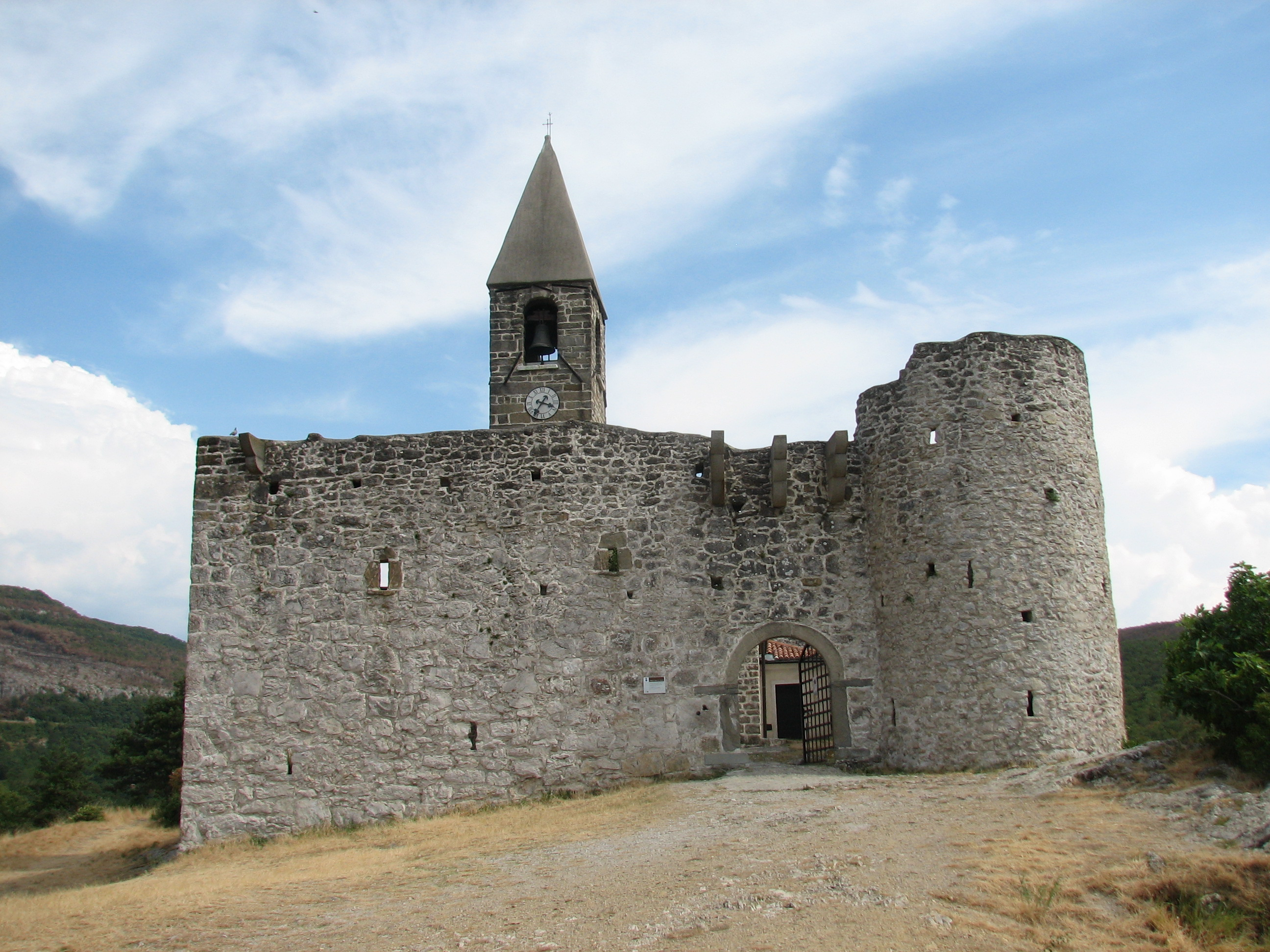
- Holy Trinity Church
- Country: Slovenia
- Denomination: Roman Catholic
- Website: SURAT4D

History
- Founder: 12th century or the 15th century
- Dedication: Holy Trinity

Architecture
- Style: Romanesque or Venetian Renaissance

Administration
- Province: Ljubljana
- Diocese: Koper
- Parish: Predloka

Holy Trinity Church (Slovene: cerkev sv. Trojice, Italian: Chiesa della Santissima Trinità) is a historical building in Hrastovlje, a village in southwestern Slovenia. There are two hypotheses about its origin. According to the first, it is a Romanesque church from the 12th century. According to the second, it is an example of the Istrian variant of Early Venetian Renaissance architecture from the 15th century.

The church stands behind a wall that the local population built to protect itself from Turkish attacks in the 16th century. Such defensive architectures are found throughout the territory settled by Slovenians and are called tabor.

== History ==
The church and wall were built on bare rock, and for this reason do not have deep foundations. The church is built mostly out of stone, as is typical for the entire coastal region. The stones were never entirely covered in an outer layer of plaster, and it is thus possible to see how the church was built. One can see that top of the church spire was rebuilt at some time, although it is not known why. The church is topped with tiles made of thick plates. These are characteristic for older roofs in the Mediterranean region.

The church has only two windows (a third window was walled up in the past) as a result of the local weather conditions. In summer, a room with a small window was protected from the sun, while in winter it was protected from the bora. Because of the low number of windows, the inside of the church is however very dark. In 1896, a hole was knocked in the northern wall to create a new window, but some of the frescoes in the church were destroyed at the same time.

Despite the lack of windows, the church nonetheless used to be better lit than it is today. This is the result of the addition of the powerful outer wall, which robs the church of much of its light.

Because of its height, the church is classed as a multi-layered church. The church in Hrastovlje differs from all other pilgrim churches in that its bell-tower is located on the western side and in that all other pilgrim churches have small wooden towers.

The church is 11.7 metres (38 ft) long and 6.05 metres (19.8 ft) wide and thereby one of the smallest churches in the area. It is not even as large as the average village church. Some claim that the church is an example of Istrian Renaissance architecture from the second half of the 15th century.

The appearance of the northwestern entrance to the church, as known today, dates back to around 1776. The original entrance was probably next to the bell-tower.

== Interior ==
Interior of the church in Hrastovlje

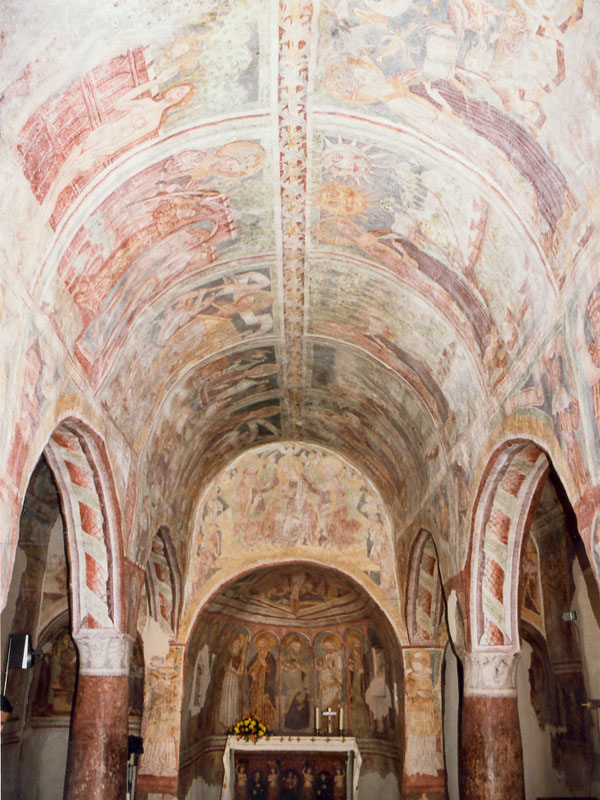
Interior of the nave

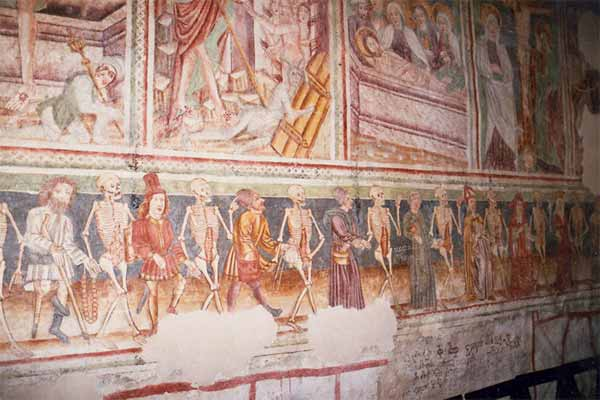
Danse Macabre, or the Dance of Death

The church has been painted with Gothic frescoes by Johannes de Castua, who finished his work on 13 July 1490. Some of them include letters in the Glagolitic script. The most famous of these frescoes is a Dance of Death or "Danse Macabre". They were discovered in 1949 under thick layers of plaster by the academic sculptor Jože Pohlen.

== The external wall ==
The church was probably built with a wall, but it was strengthened by Leander Zarotus. It is 8 metres (26 ft) thick and is made out of limestone. It would be hard to determine exactly when the wall was built, but it is estimated that it was constructed some time around the end of the 15th century, therefore definitely later than the church itself. The wall encloses the entire building and only the bell-tower with its cross peek out over the top. It was first built as a defensive measure against the Turks and is shaped like an irregular rectangle.

There are two bastion-shaped towers in the corners. One stands in the southeast, the other is located on the opposite side (northwest) and protects the entrance from the village side. Two layers for archers can be recognised in the towers; the walls must at some time have been taller, because it was possible to place three layers of archers on them. There was also a balcony above the entrance gates, from which it was possible to defend the church by throwing stones or pouring boiling water on attackers.
