= Šavrinke =

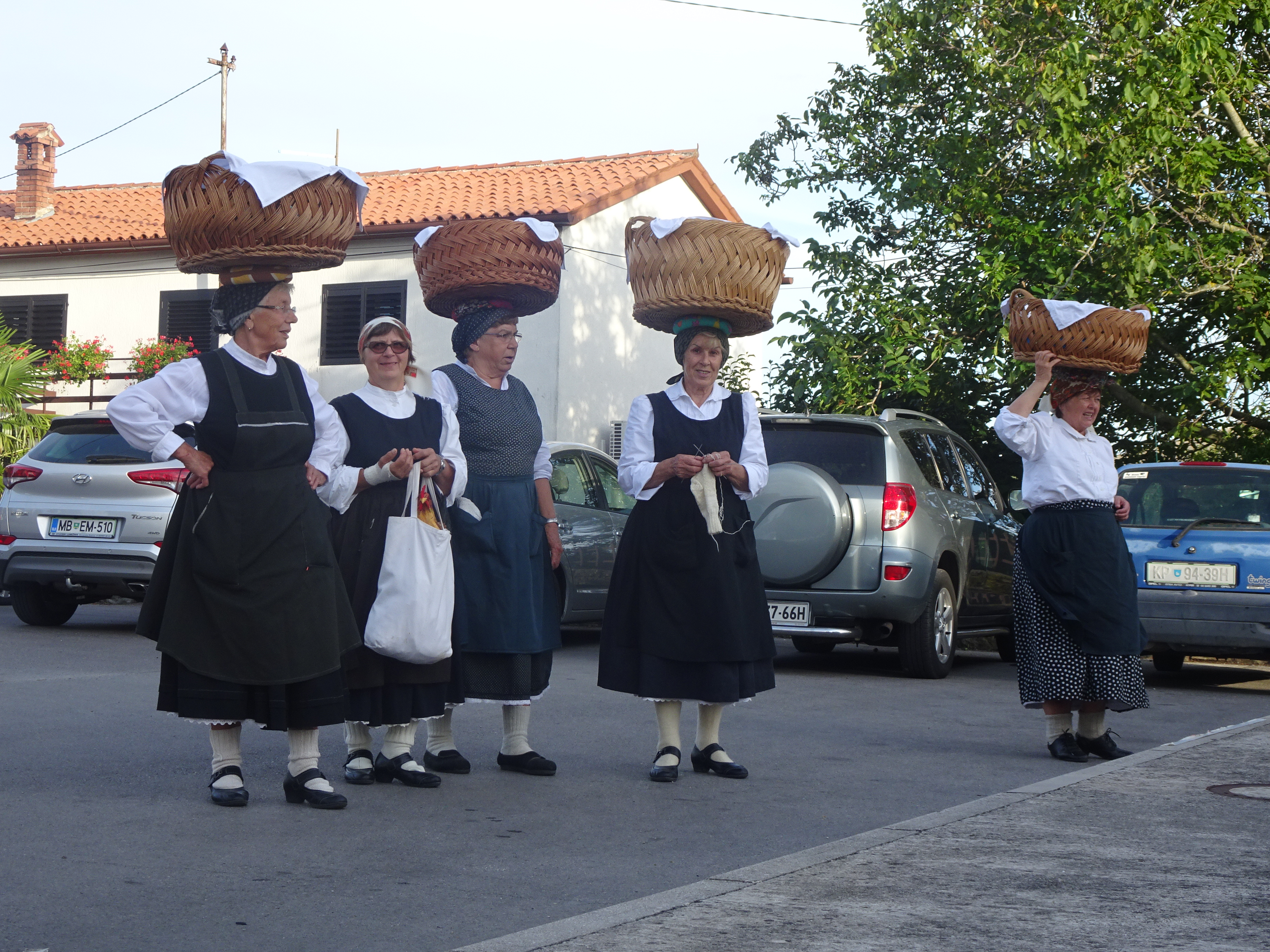
"Šavrinke" in traditional Istrian clothing

Šavrinke (Slovene: Šavrinke, singular: Šavrinka; Italian: savrine or saurine) were girls and women from the hinterlands of northern Slovene Istria as well as Croatian Istria who sold crops and other minor goods in town markets.

Active especially around the city of Trieste, now in Italy, Šavrinke supplemented their household income by selling agricultural products to nearby towns. The main product sold by the Šavrinke was eggs. In order to procure them, they sometimes brought products such as needles, threads, pins, and scissors back to the village.

Like many other forms of female work outside the household, Šavrinke were normally engaged in this form of trade as young adolescents. In particular, they would learn the trade from their mothers after completing six grades of primary school and would cease work upon marriage. Only in dire economic situations did married women continue working in this trade, which sometimes required multiple days of walking between urban and rural centers, or at least three hours of walking a day. The Šavrinke mostly sold eggs and bread, but also collected berries and nuts on the road.

The households in which women worked as Šavrinke were mostly very poor. The men of the household, thus, often sought paid work as well by walking around villages in the area of Trieste with a hoe on their shoulders. The hoe on a man's shoulder, thus, marked one as being available to work and also as being poor. The equivalent mark for the Šavrinke was their feet, which were marked by dust, mud, and animal excrement that filled the roads. In the Slovene dialect spoken in this area (known as Bržanija or Kraški rob), this type of road dirt was called šavre, hence name given to these women. Most dictionaries, though, translate šavra as an "awkward, clumsy" woman. It is uncertain whether Slovenia's Šavrin Hills are named after the Šavrinke or vice versa.

This form of labor was mostly a phenomenon of the late nineteenth century, and it has largely disappeared by the end of the World War II. A key economic institution in the Istrian countryside in peacetime, the work of the Šavrinke was curtailed by government regulations aimed to regulate the sale of eggs in Austria during World War I and in Italy, to which the region belonged after the war, under Fascism. The subsequent introduction of egg-selling licenses, which were quite expensive, turned the vast majority of the Šavrinke into de facto smugglers, who put themselves and their children at risk. Under Italian rule, the punishment for engaging in illegal trade of eggs was mostly carried by the local police forces, who confiscated the eggs and sometimes arrested the smuggler for one night. Their adaptation to the illegal status of their work added other highly desired goods to the repertoire of the Šavrinke, such as grappa and cigarettes. This was the case even when their trade was not necessarily criminalized in post-WW2 Italy and Yugoslavia, partly under the Treaty of Rome of 1955.

In contemporary Slovenia, the Šavrinke became part of local folklore. They are remembered as women who brought enviable income to their villages through hard work, which also made them at some point a valuable marriage partner. A symbol of Istria, their lives were commemorated in novels like Marjan Tomšič's Šavrinke (1986) as well as poems by Alojz Kocjančič (collected in Šavrinske pesmi, 1962). South to the village of Hrastovlje in the Slovene Littoral is a sculpture by the famous painter and village-native Jože Pohlen, erected in 1990, that depicts a Šavrinka carrying a basket of bread over her head. A local cultural association, "Šavrini inu anka Šavrinke", often reenacts scenes from the life of these women for the public as a form of heritage conservation. The rediscovery and enshrinement of the Šavrinke is seen by some scholars as part of the development of a regional Istrian identity that crosses state borders but emphasizes the Slovene national element, if not dominance, in the region.
