= Loka, Koper =

Loka
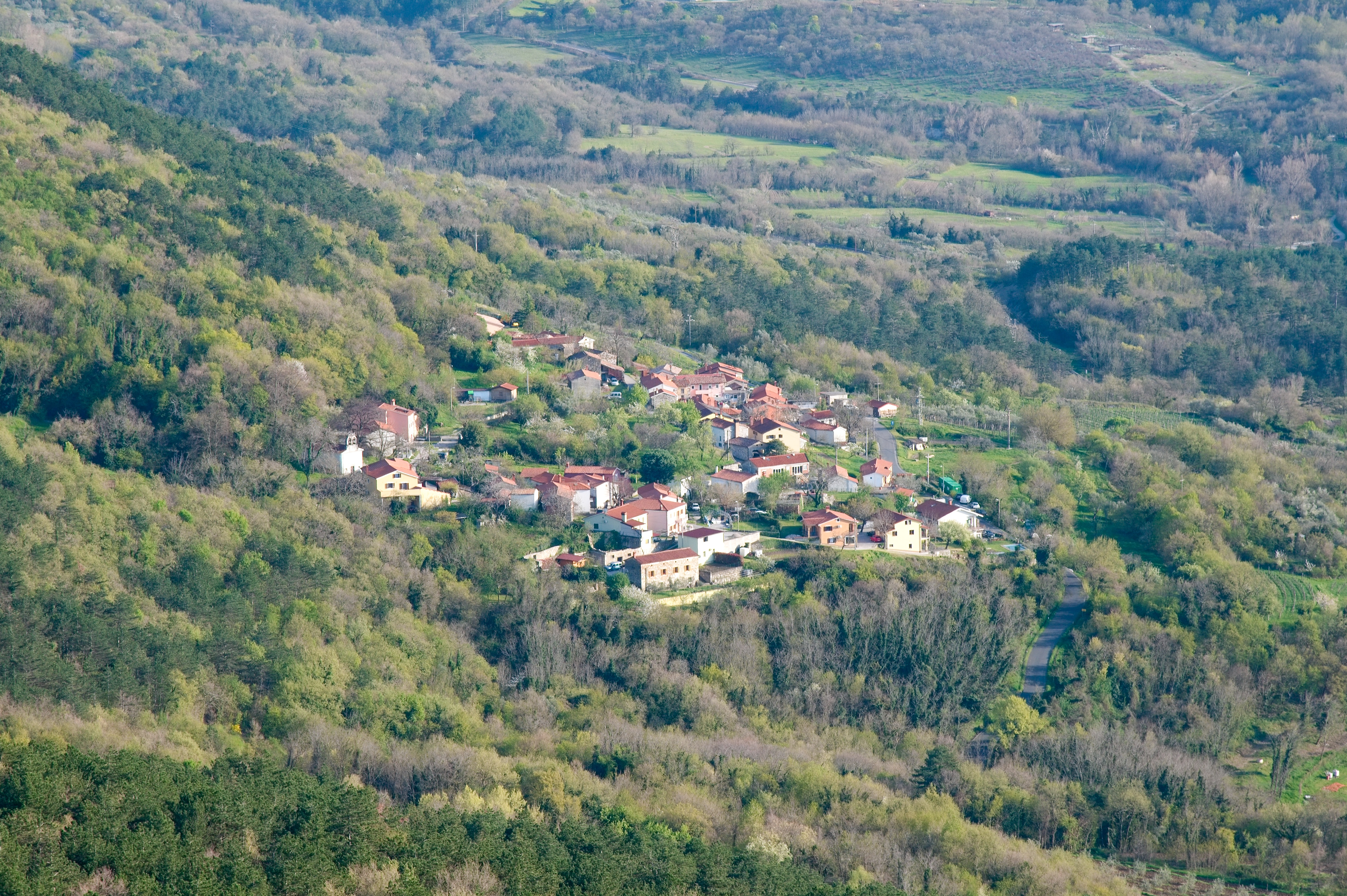

- Location in Slovenia
- Coordinates: 45°32′8.23″N 13°53′20.75″E
- Country: Slovenia
- Traditional region: Littoral
- Statistical region: Coastal–Karst
- Municipality: Koper

Area
  - Total: 2.42 km^{2} (0.93 sq mi)
- Elevation: 161.6 m (530 ft)

Population (2002)
  - Total: 76

Loka (pronounced [ˈloːka]; Italian: Lonche) is a small village in the City Municipality of Koper in the Littoral region of Slovenia.

== Name ==
The toponym Loka is relatively common in Slovenia. It is derived from the Slovene noun loka 'swampy meadow', from Proto-Slavic *lǫka 'swampy, flood-prone meadow', semantically derived from 'meander'. Toponyms of the same origin are also found in other Slavic countries (e.g., Polish Łąka, Serbian Luka, Bulgarian Shiroka Laka, etc.). The Italian name Lonche reflects the early Slavic nasal vowel.

== History ==
During the Second World War, from March to September 1943 the first regional committee of the Liberation Front of the Slovene Nation was headquartered at the house of Ivan Žigante (a.k.a. Peter) in the hamlet of Žgani. Loka was burned by German forces on 12 October 1943.

== Church ==
The local church is dedicated to Saint Cecilia and belongs to the Parish of Predloka. The medieval church was burned by German forces on 12 October 1943 and its ruins were registered as cultural heritage. The parish archive, which had been transferred from Predloka to Loka for safekeeping, was also destroyed in the fire. The church was rebuilt by the villagers in 2005.

== Archaeology ==
The Loka area contains many karst caves. A 1911 archaeological dig in Loka Cave (Slovene: Ločka jama) yielded the bones of a cave bear and part of a human jaw. A Neolithic left canine tooth from the jaw was found to contain a beeswax filling in 2012, leading to speculation that it may be the oldest example of a dental filling. The Loka Cave site is part of the archaeological site known as Za gradom ('behind the castle'), named for the ruins of a fort that was part of 15th- and 16th-century fortifications along the Austrian-Venetian border.
