= Hrastovlje =

Hrastovlje Cristoglie
- Village
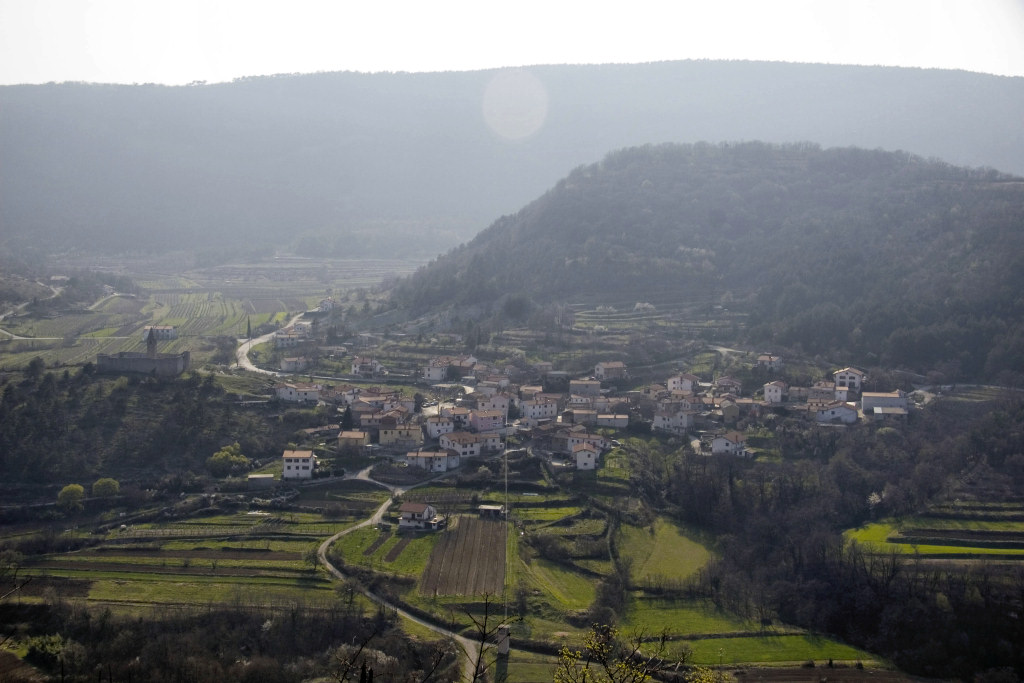
- Panoramic view of the village

- Location in Slovenia
- Coordinates: 45°30′38.23″N 13°54′0.3″E
- Country: Slovenia
- Traditional region: Littoral
- Statistical region: Coastal–Karst
- Municipality: Koper

Area
  - Total: 3.03 km^{2} (1.17 sq mi)
- Elevation: 165.1 m (542 ft)

Population (2002)
  - Total: 143

Hrastovlje (pronounced [xɾaˈstoːu̯ljɛ]; Italian: Cristoglie, German: Chrästeirach) is a village in the City Municipality of Koper in the Littoral region of Slovenia.

== Etymology ==
Hrastovlje was attested in written sources in the 14th century as Cristoglan (and as Cristoviae in 1581, and Christoja in 1763–87). The name is derived from the plural demonym *Xrastovľane, referring to residents of a village named after oak trees (Slovene: hrast).

== Geography ==
Hrastovlje is also the location of the only major spring in Slovenian Istria, the karst spring of the Rižana River, which is itself the most important source of water supply for the Slovenian coastal area and part of the habitat range of the marbled trout listed on the IUCN Red List.

== Holy Trinity Church and fresco ==
Hrastovlje is best known for Holy Trinity Church, which contains a late-medieval Danse Macabre fresco. The church itself belongs to the Parish of Predloka. It is a stone-built church, typical of the area, and stands on a small hill above the village inside a walled enclosure 8 m high. The church was built in the late Romanesque tradition before 1480. The encampment wall, built in the late 15th and early 16th centuries, is an irregular rectangle with cylindrical towers in exposed corners.

The frescos inside the church date to 1490 and are some of the best preserved in Slovenia. They were plastered over and whitewashed, and were only rediscovered in 1949 and were carefully restored. The most famous is the 7 m sequence known as the Dance of Death on the south wall of the nave, representing people of all walks of life from kings and popes to beggars and babies being led by skeletons towards Death itself. Scenes from the Book of Genesis also decorate the nave, images of the Apostles are painted in niches in the apse, with other saints and prophets as well as a Passion series and the journey and adoration of the Magi.
