= Danse Macabre =

Artistic motif on the universality of death

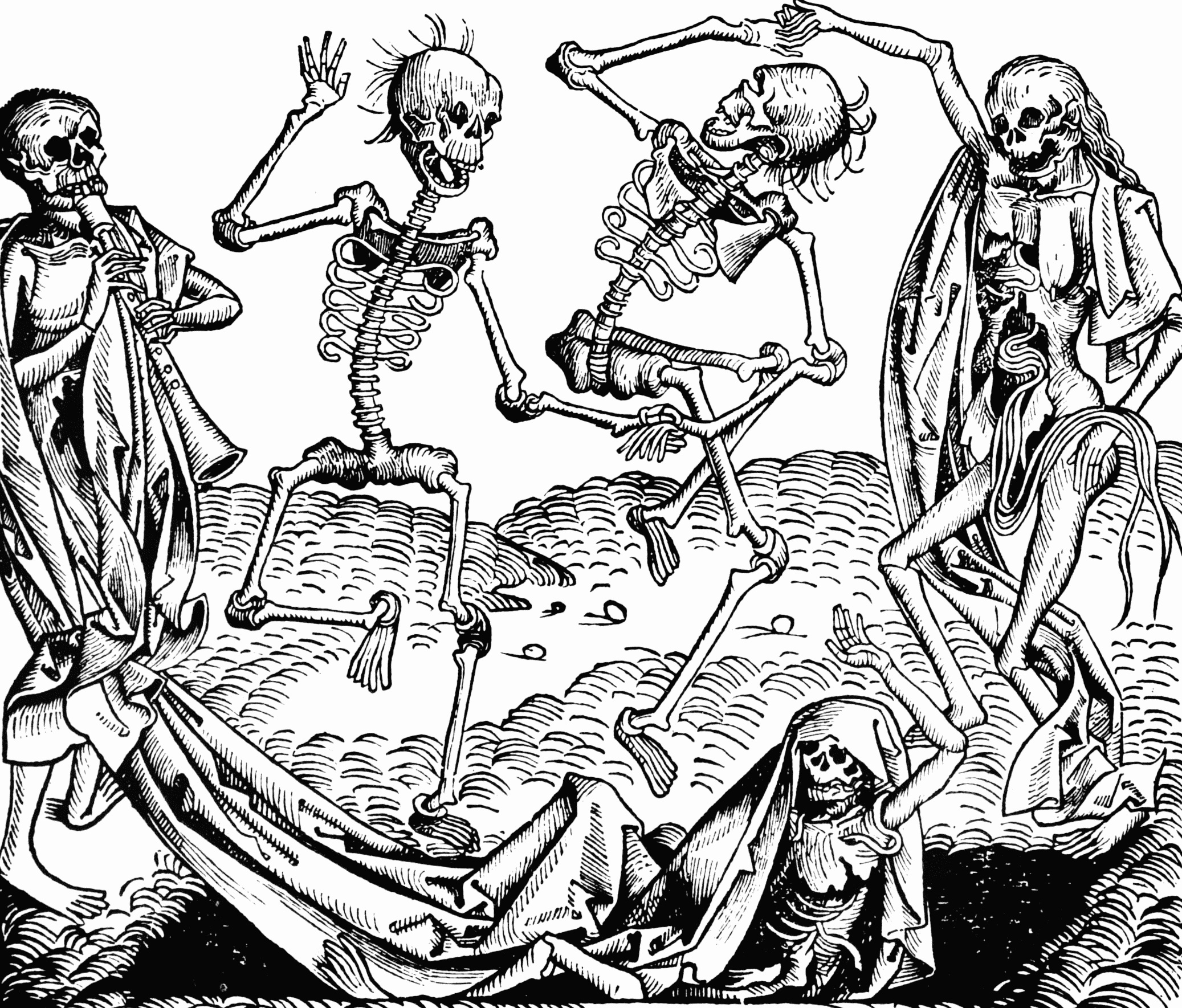
The Dance of Death (1493) by Michael Wolgemut, from the Nuremberg Chronicle of Hartmann Schedel

The Danse macabre (/dɑːns məˈkɑːb(rə)/; French pronunciation: [dɑ̃s ma.kabʁ]), also called the Dance of Death, is an artistic genre of allegory from the Late Middle Ages on the universality of death.

The Danse macabre consists of the dead, or a personification of death, summoning representatives from all walks of life to dance along to the grave, typically with a pope, emperor, king, child, and labourer. It was produced as memento mori, to remind people of the fragility of their lives and the vanity of earthly glory. Its origins are postulated from illustrated sermon texts; the earliest recorded visual scheme (apart from 14th century Triumph of Death paintings) was a now-lost mural at Holy Innocents' Cemetery in Paris dating from 1424 to 1425. In 1874 the French composer Camille Saint-Saëns wrote Danse macabre, Op. 40, a haunting symphonic "poem" for orchestra. It premiered 24 January 1875.

== Background ==
Religion is an important contextual factor around the Dance of Death tradition and its effect on the population, with new eschatology concepts in the fourteenth century being critical for the development of the Dance of Death. Early examples of Dance of Death artwork were present in religious contexts such as murals on Christian church walls. These served to remind people about the inevitability of death and urge moral reflection in order to cope with this reality. In his 1998 study on medieval religious practices, historian Francis Rapp wrote that

Christians were moved by the sight of the Infant Jesus playing on his mother's knee; their hearts were touched by the Pietà; and patron saints reassured them by their presence. But, all the while, the danse macabre urged them not to forget the end of all earthly things.

It is generally agreed upon by scholars that Dance of Death depictions do show realistic dancing based on the quality of gestures seen in artwork and familiarity with steps found in texts. The paintings include body positions that seem to indicate movement, particular gestures, and specific orders and dynamics between the characters, while texts use relevant dance vocabulary. These elements may indicate the presence of past enacted dances and that the depictions were read for a performative function, as hypothesized by Gertsman in her paper "Pleyinge and Peyntynge: Performing the Dance of Death." This view centers on the incorporation of both visual and theatrical devices in these depictions to create effective artwork. Gertsman writes that

By drawing its inspiration from the sphere of performance, the Dance of Death imagery, along with its text, invites a performative reading, informed by specific structures of the verses, the concept of movement, and the understanding of the body language of the danse macabre's protagonists.

However, there is scarce evidence surrounding a physical dancing performance tradition of the Dance of Death outside of its other depictions. The Danse macabre was possibly enacted at village pageants and at court masques, with people "dressing up as corpses from various strata of society", and may have been the origin of costumes worn during Allhallowtide. Regardless, its main influence has been in the form of visual arts such as murals, paintings, and more.

The bubonic plague and its devastating effects on the European population were significantly contributing factors to the inspiration and solidification of the Dance of Death tradition in the fourteenth century. In her thesis, The Black Death and its Effect on 14th and 15th Century Art, Anna Louise Des Ormeaux describes the effect of the Black Death on art, mentioning the Danse macabre as she does so:

Some plague art contains gruesome imagery that was directly influenced by the mortality of the plague or by the medieval fascination with the macabre and awareness of death that were augmented by the plague. Some plague art documents psychosocial responses to the fear that plague aroused in its victims. Other plague art is of a subject that directly responds to people's reliance on religion to give them hope.

The cultural impact of mass outbreaks of disease are not fleeting or temporary. In their paper on "Black Death, Plagues, and the Danse Macabre. Depictions of Epidemics in Art," Rittershaus and Eschenberg discuss artistic representations of various epidemics starting with the bubonic plague and extending to cholera and recent epidemics. The suffering and realization of death's closeness, which the black death caused in Europe, were integrated with concepts of morality and Christianity to give rise to the Dance of Death tradition as a direct response to the epidemic. Cholera cases in the nineteenth century inspired a resurgence of Dance of Death depictions after the initial black death depictions, with religious connotations still present but less important. The Dance of Death tradition is a testament to the profound impact of an epidemic on people as depicted in art. A disease's effect can endure past the initial stages of outbreak, in its deep etching upon the culture and society. This can be seen in the artworks and motifs of Danse macabre as people attempted to cope with the death surrounding them.

== Paintings ==
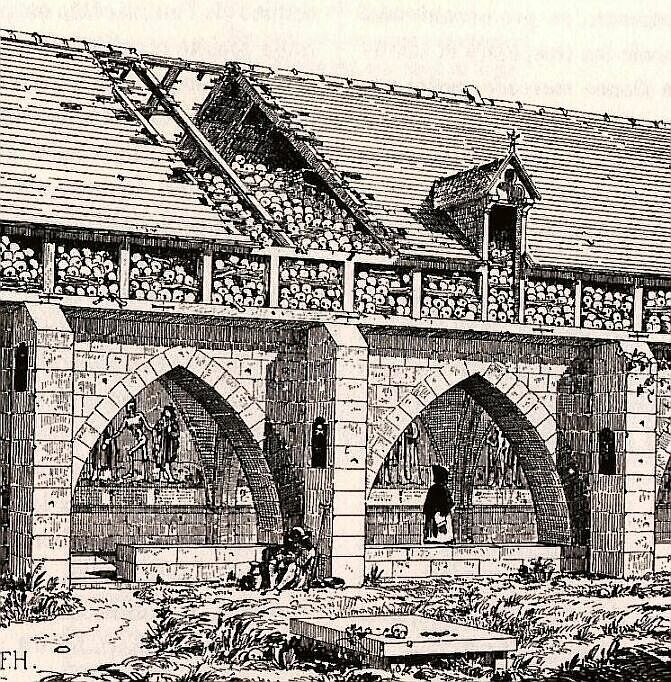
Charnel house at Holy Innocents' Cemetery, Paris, with mural of a Danse macabre (1424–25)

What is often considered to be the earliest recorded visual example is the lost mural on the south wall of the Cemetery of the Holy Innocents in Paris. It was painted in 1424–25 during the regency of John, Duke of Bedford. It features an emphatic inclusion of a dead crowned king at a time when France did not have a crowned king. The mural may well have had a political subtext. However, some have argued that 14th century Triumph of Death paintings such as the fresco by Francesco Traini are also examples of danse macabre.

There were also painted schemes in Basel (the earliest dating from c. 1440); a series of paintings on canvas by Bernt Notke (1440–1509) in Lübeck (1463); the initial fragment of the original Bernt Notke painting Danse macabre (accomplished at the end of the 15th century) in the St Nicholas' Church, Tallinn, Estonia; the painting at the back wall of the chapel of Sv. Marija na Škrilinama in the Istrian town of Beram (1474), painted by Vincent of Kastav; the painting in the Holy Trinity Church of Hrastovlje, Istria by John of Kastav (1490).

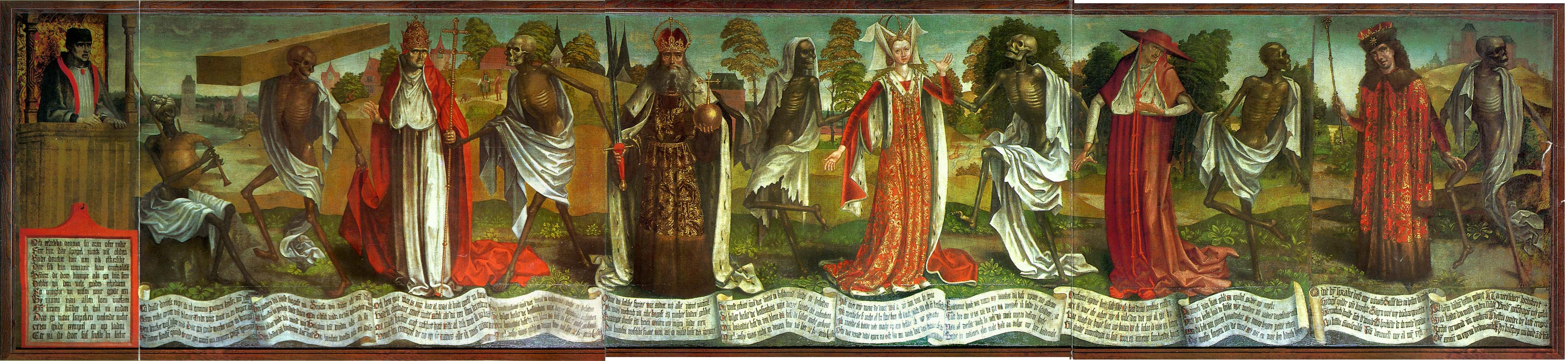
Bernt Notke: Surmatants (Totentanz) from St. Nicholas' Church, Tallinn, end of 15th century

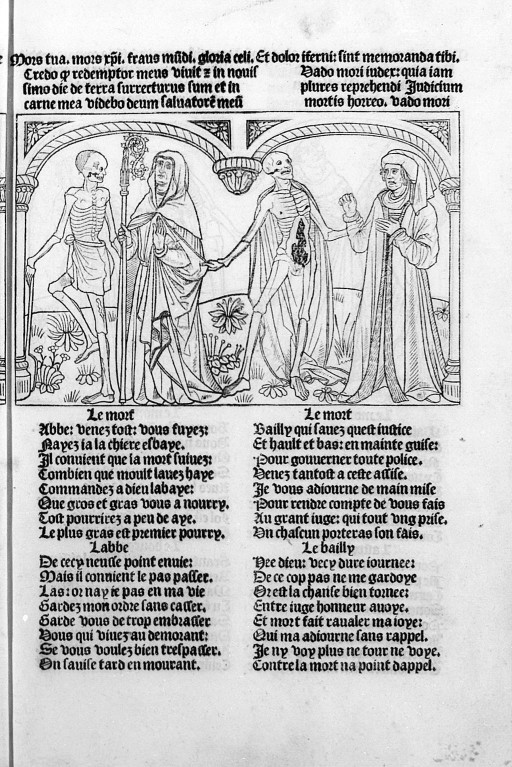
An abbot and a bailiff, dancing the Danse macabre, miniature from a 1486 book, printed by Guy Marchant in Paris

A notable example was painted on the cemetery walls of the Dominican Abbey, in Bern, by Niklaus Manuel Deutsch (1484–1530) in 1516/7. This work of art was destroyed when the wall was torn down in 1660, but a 1649 copy by Albrecht Kauw (1621–1681) is extant. There was also a Dance of Death painted around 1430 and displayed on the walls of Pardon Churchyard at Old St Paul's Cathedral, London, with texts by John Lydgate (1370–1451) known as the 'Dance of (St) Poulys', which was destroyed in 1549.

The deathly horrors of the 14th century such as recurring famines, the Hundred Years' War in France, and, most of all, the Black Death, were culturally assimilated throughout Europe. The omnipresent possibility of sudden and painful death increased the religious desire for penance, but it also evoked a hysterical desire for amusement while still possible; a last dance as cold comfort. The Danse macabre combines both desires: in many ways similar to the medieval mystery plays, the dance-with-death allegory was originally a didactic dialogue poem to remind people of the inevitability of death and to advise them strongly to be prepared at all times for death (see memento mori and Ars moriendi).

Short verse dialogues between Death and each of its victims, which could have been performed as plays, can be found in the direct aftermath of the Black Death in Germany and in Spain (where it was known as the Totentanz and la Danza de la Muerte, respectively).

The French term Danse macabre may derive from the Latin Chorea Machabæorum, literally "dance of the Maccabees." In 2 Maccabees, a deuterocanonical book of the Bible, the grim martyrdom of a mother and her seven sons is described and was a well-known medieval subject. It is possible that the Maccabean Martyrs were commemorated in some early French plays, or that people just associated the book's vivid descriptions of the martyrdom with the interaction between Death and its prey.

An alternative explanation is that the term entered France via Spain, the Arabic: مقابر, maqabir (pl., "cemeteries") being the root of the word. Both the dialogues and the evolving paintings were ostensive penitential lessons that even illiterate people (who were the overwhelming majority) could understand.

== Mural paintings ==
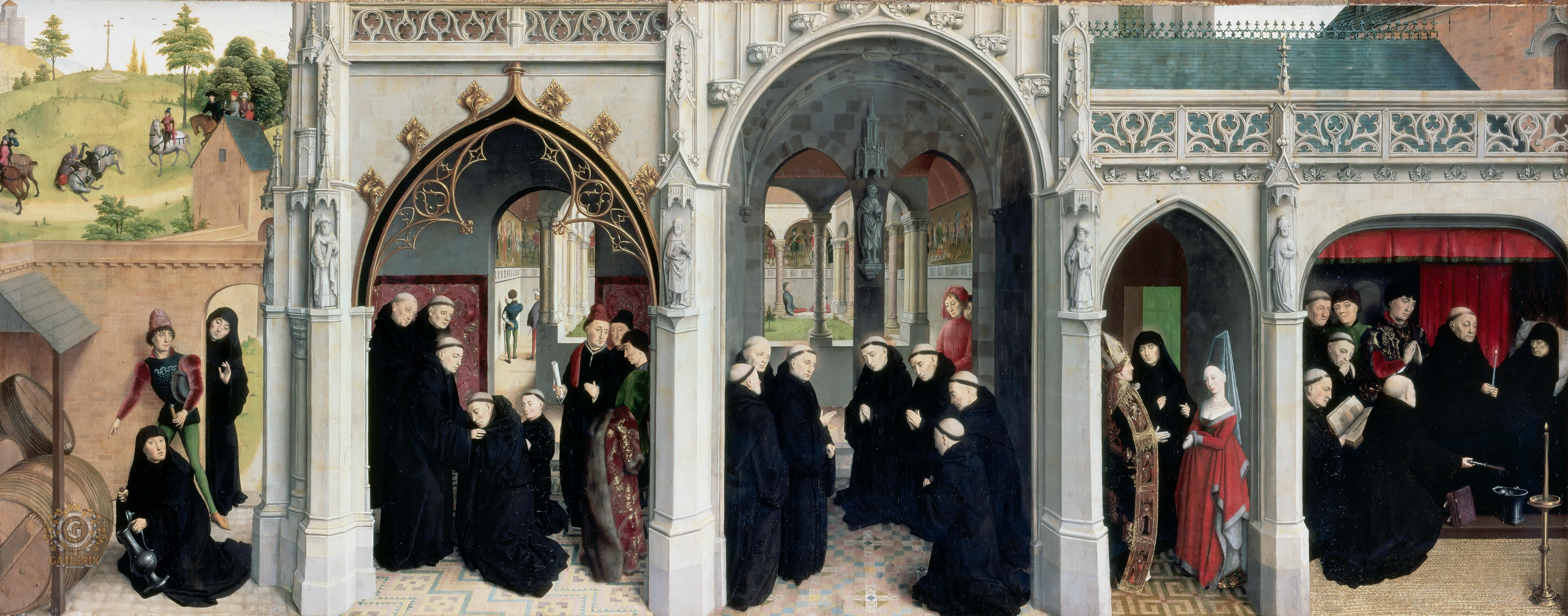
Simon Marmion: Right wing (inside) of the former high altar of the abbey church of St-Bertin in St-Omer (1455–1459) with the depiction of a dance of death fresco in the cloister gallery

Frescoes and murals dealing with death had a long tradition, and were widespread. For example, the legend of the Three Living and the Three Dead. On a ride or hunt, three young gentlemen meet three cadavers (sometimes described as their ancestors) who warn them, Quod fuimus, estis; quod sumus, vos eritis ("What we were, you are; what we are, you will be"). Numerous mural versions of that legend from the 13th century onwards have survived (for instance, in the Hospital Church of Wismar or the residential Longthorpe Tower outside Peterborough). Since they showed pictorial sequences of men and corpses covered with shrouds, those paintings are sometimes regarded as cultural precursors of the new genre.

A Danse macabre painting may show a round dance headed by Death or, more usually, a chain of alternating dead and live dancers. From the highest ranks of the mediaeval hierarchy (usually pope and emperor) descending to its lowest (beggar, peasant, and child), each mortal's hand is taken by an animated skeleton or cadaver. The famous Totentanz by Bernt Notke in St. Mary's Church, Lübeck (destroyed during the Allied bombing of Lübeck in World War II), presented the dead dancers as very lively and agile, making the impression that they were actually dancing, whereas their living dancing partners looked clumsy and passive. The apparent class distinction in almost all of these paintings is completely neutralized by Death as the ultimate equalizer, so that a sociocritical element is subtly inherent to the whole genre. The Totentanz of Metnitz, for example, shows how a pope crowned with his tiara is being led into Hell by Death.

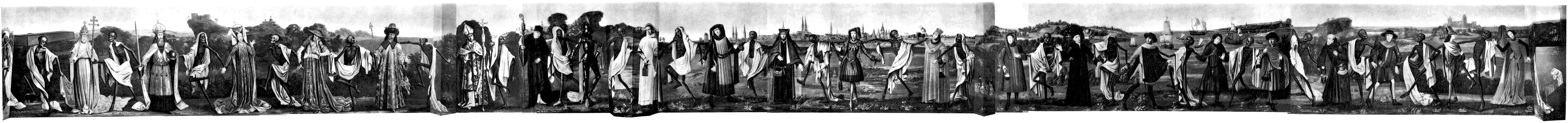
Lübecker Totentanz by Bernt Notke (around 1463, destroyed in a bombing raid in 1942)

Usually, a short dialogue is attached to each pair of dancers, in which Death is summoning him (or, more rarely, her) to dance and the summoned is moaning about impending death. In the first printed Totentanz textbook (Anon.: Vierzeiliger oberdeutscher Totentanz, Heidelberger Blockbuch, c. 1455/58), Death addresses, for example, the emperor:

Emperor, your sword won't help you out
Sceptre and crown are worthless here
I've taken you by the hand
For you must come to my dance

At the lower end of the Totentanz, Death calls, for example, the peasant to dance, who answers:

I had to work very much and very hard
The sweat was running down my skin
I'd like to escape death nonetheless
But here I won't have any luck

Various examples of Danse macabre in Slovenia and Croatia below:

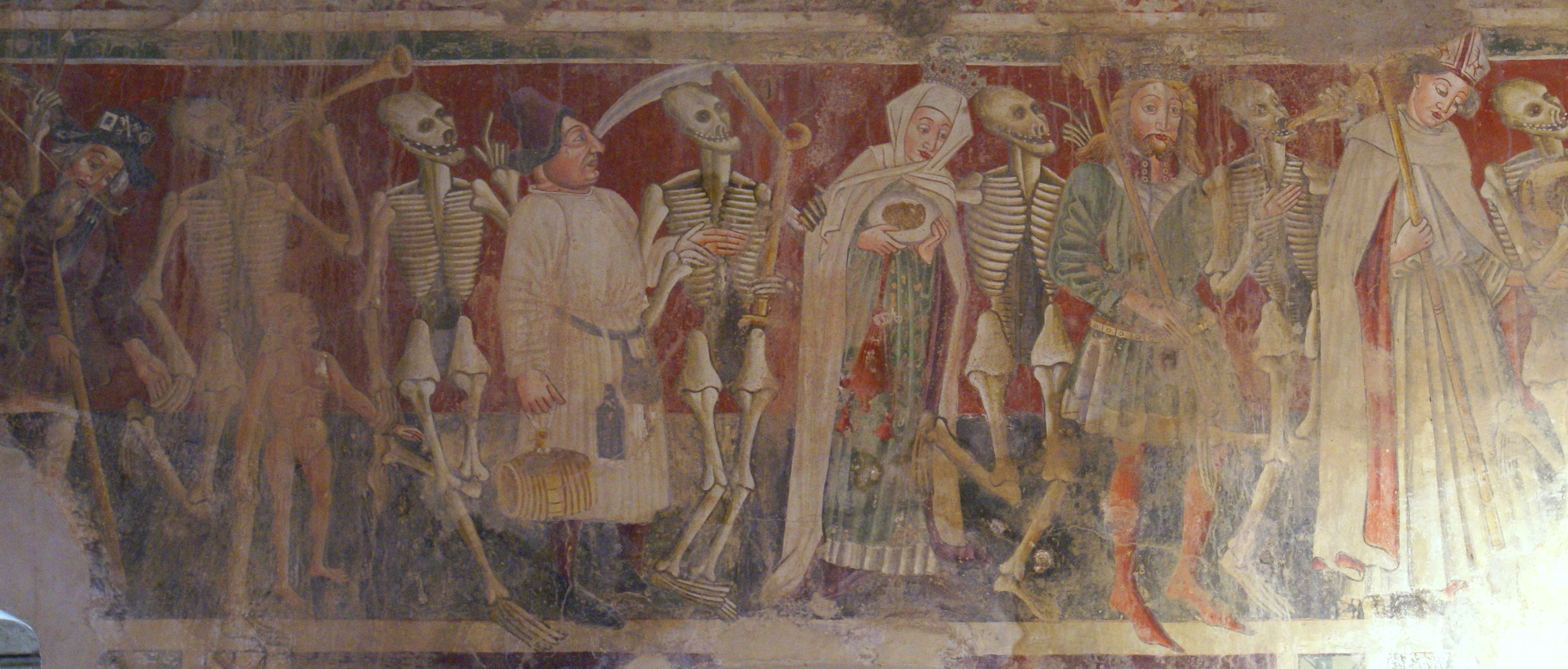
The fresco at the back wall of the Church of St. Mary of the Rocks in the Istrian town of Beram (1474), painted by Vincent of Kastav, Croatia

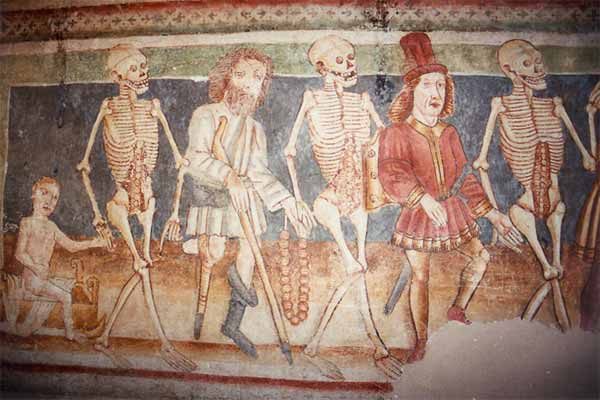
John of Kastav: Detail of the Dance Macabre fresco (1490) in the Holy Trinity Church in Hrastovlje, Slovenia

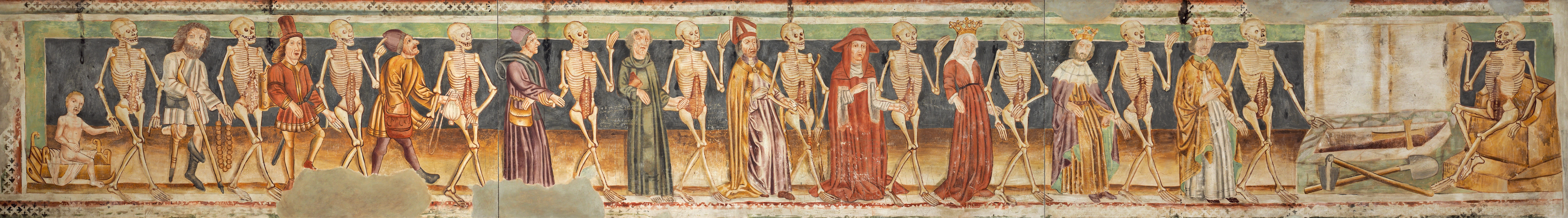
Dance of Death (replica of 15th century fresco; National Gallery of Slovenia)

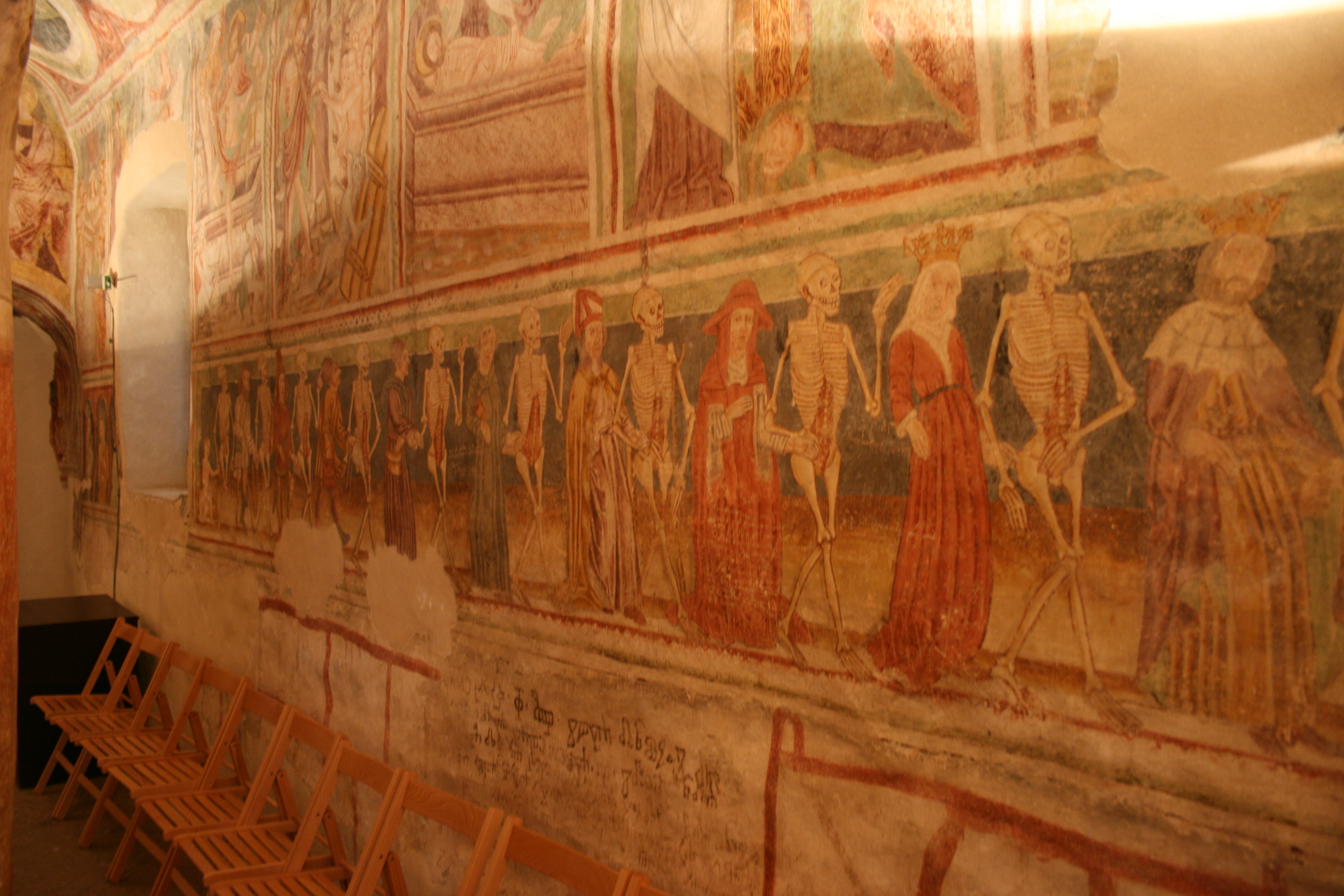
The famous Danse macabre in Hrastovlje in the Holy Trinity Church

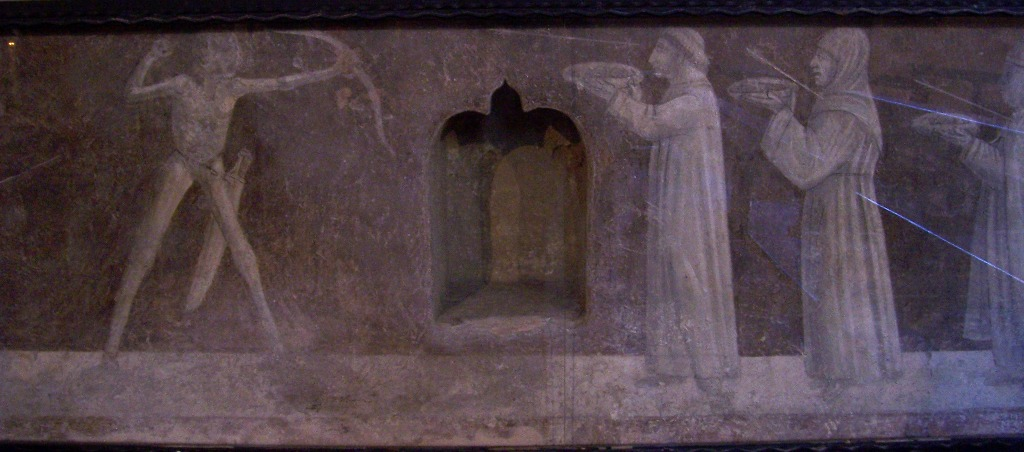
Danse macabre in St Maria in Bienno, 16th century

== Hans Holbein's woodcuts ==
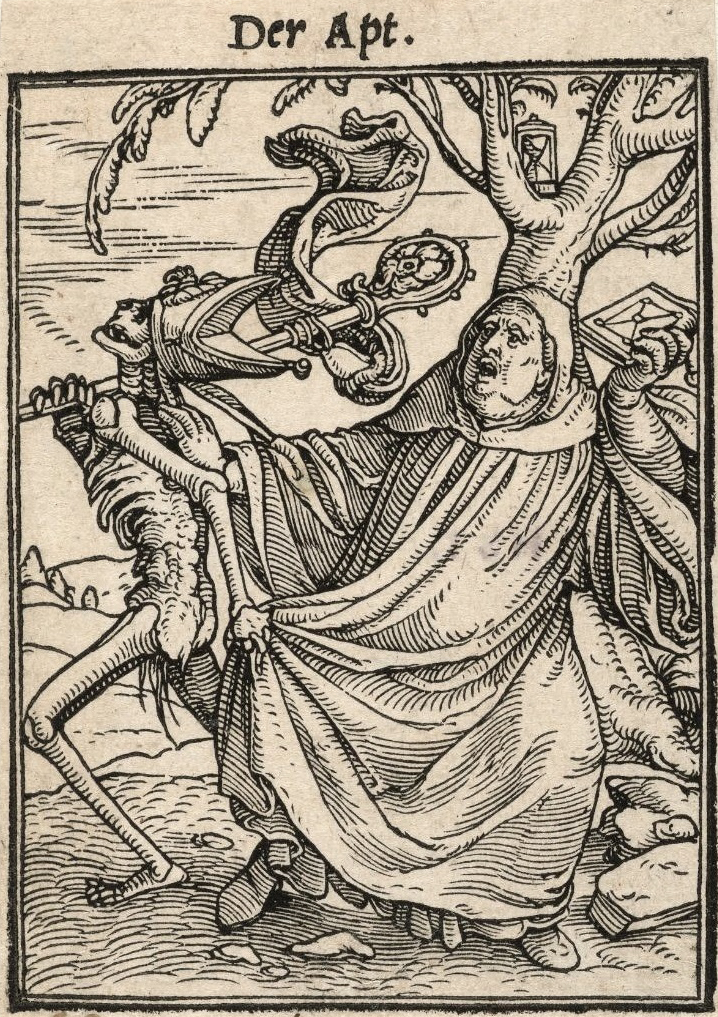
Hans Holbein the Younger, woodcut, 1526, The Abbot

The 41 famous designs by Hans Holbein the Younger (1497–1543) for his Dance of Death series were drawn in 1526 while he was in Basel. They were cut in wood by the accomplished Formschneider (block cutter) Hans Lützelburger.

William Ivins (quoting W. J. Linton) writes of Lützelburger's work wrote: "'Nothing indeed, by knife or by graver, is of higher quality than this man's doing.' For by common acclaim the originals are technically the most marvelous woodcuts ever made."

These woodcuts soon appeared in proofs with titles in German. The first book edition, titled Les Simulachres et Historiées Faces de la Mort and containing forty-one woodcuts, was published at Lyons by the Treschsel brothers in 1538. The popularity of the work, and the currency of its message, are underscored by the fact that there were eleven editions before 1562, and over the sixteenth century perhaps as many as a hundred unauthorized editions and imitations. Ten further designs were added in later editions.

The Dance of Death (1523–26) refashions the late-medieval allegory of the Danse macabre as a reformist satire, and one can see the beginnings of a gradual shift from traditional to reformed Christianity. That shift had many permutations however, and in a study Natalie Zemon Davis has shown that the contemporary reception and afterlife of Holbein's designs lent themselves to neither purely Catholic or Protestant doctrine, but could be outfitted with different surrounding prefaces and sermons as printers and writers of different political and religious leanings took them up. Most importantly, "The pictures and the Bible quotations above them were the main attractions […] Both Catholics and Protestants wished, through the pictures, to turn men's thoughts to a Christian preparation for death.".

The 1538 edition which contained Latin quotations from the Bible above Holbein's designs, and a French quatrain below composed by Gilles Corrozet (1510–1568) actually did not credit Holbein as the artist. It bore the title: Les simulachres & / HISTORIEES FACES / DE LA MORT, AUTANT ELE/gammēt pourtraictes, que artifi/ciellement imaginées. / A Lyon. / Soubz l'escu de COLOIGNE. / M.D. XXXVIII. ("Images and Illustrated facets of Death, as elegantly depicted as they are artfully conceived.") These images and workings of death as captured in the phrase "histories faces" of the title "are the particular exemplification of the way death works, the individual scenes in which the lessons of mortality are brought home to people of every station."

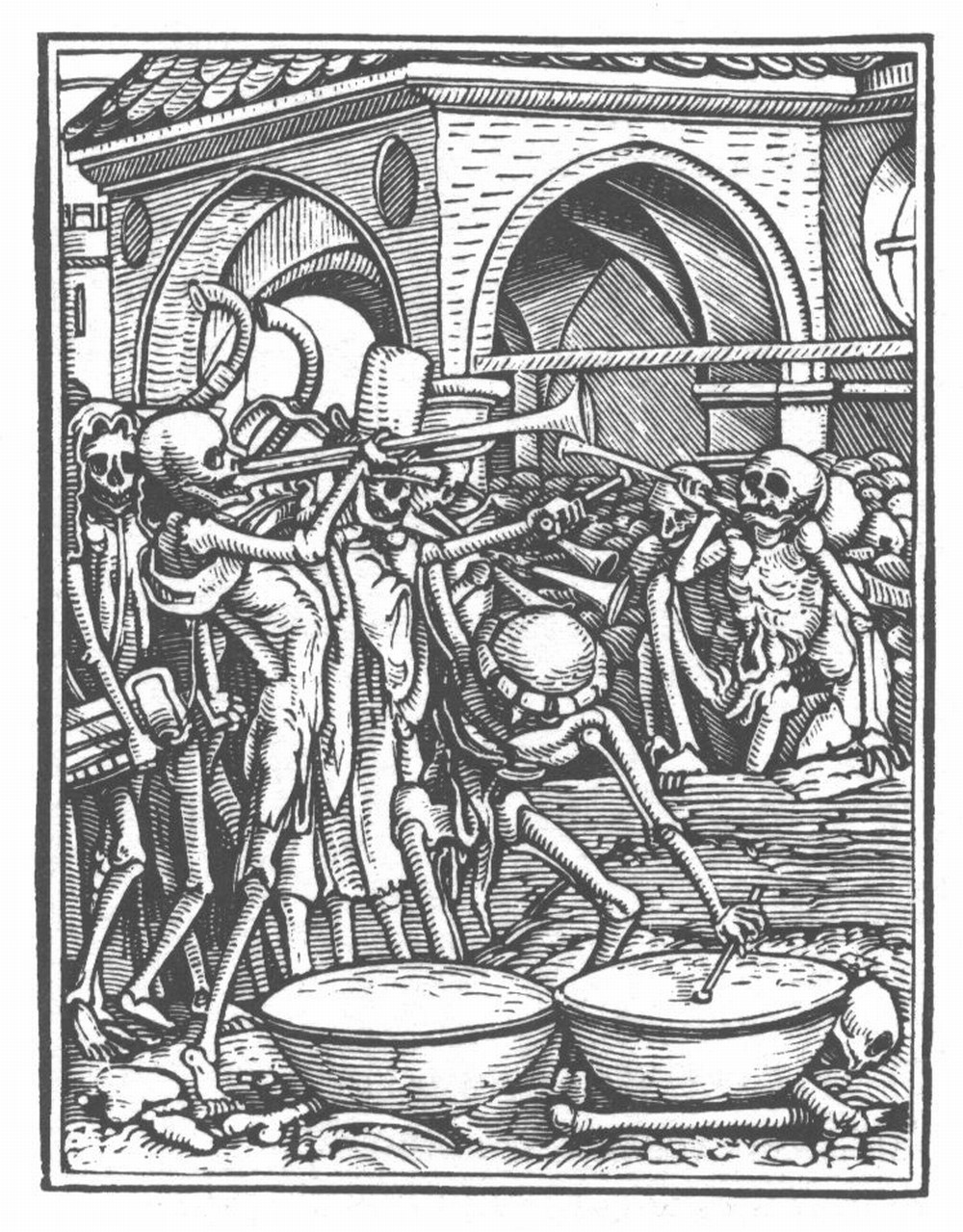
From Holbein's Simolachri, Historie, e Figure de la Morte (in Lyone Appresso Giovan Frellone, 1549)

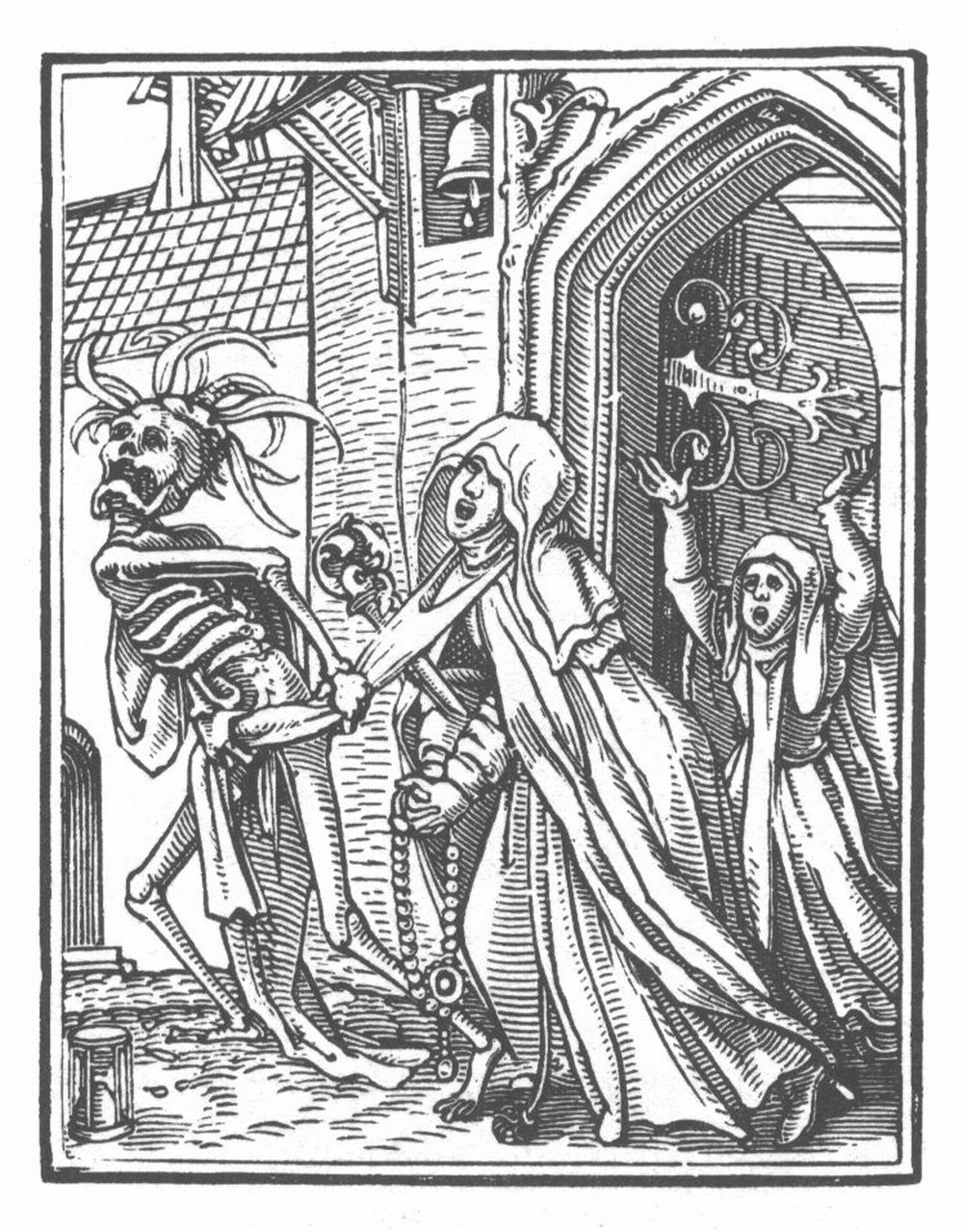
The Abbess from Holbein's Simolachri, Historie, e Figure de la Morte, 1549

In his preface to the work Jean de Vauzèle, the Prior of Montrosier, addresses Jehanne de Tourzelle, the Abbess of the Convent at St. Peter at Lyons, and names Holbein's attempts to capture the ever-present, but never directly seen, abstract images of death "simulachres." He writes: "[…] simulachres les dis ie vrayement, pour ce que simulachre vient de simuler, & faindre ce que n'est point." ("Simulachres they are most correctly called, for simulachre derives from the verb to simulate and to feign that which is not really there.") He next employs a trope from the memento mori (remember we all must die) tradition and a metaphor from printing which well captures the undertakings of Death, the artist, and the printed book before us in which these simulachres of death barge in on the living: "Et pourtant qu'on n'a peu trouver chose plus approchante a la similitude de Mort, que la personne morte, on d'icelle effigie simulachres, & faces de Mort, pour en nos pensees imprimer la memoire de Mort plus au vis, que ne pourroient toutes les rhetoriques descriptiones de orateurs." ("And yet we cannot discover any one thing more near the likeness of Death than the dead themselves, whence come these simulated effigies and images of Death's affairs, which imprint the memory of Death with more force than all the rhetorical descriptions of the orators ever could.").

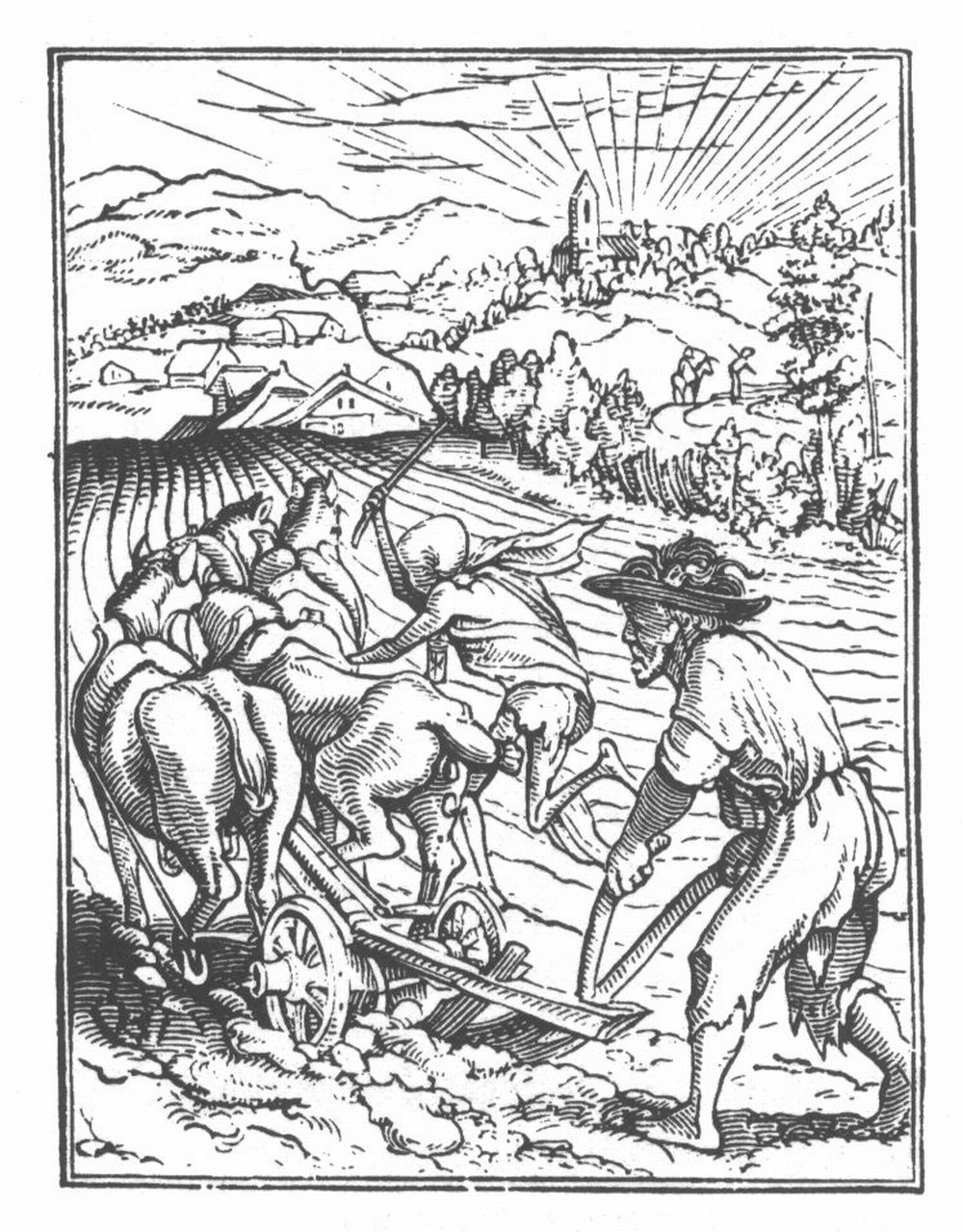
The Plowman from Holbein's Simolachri, Historie, e Figure de la Morte, 1549

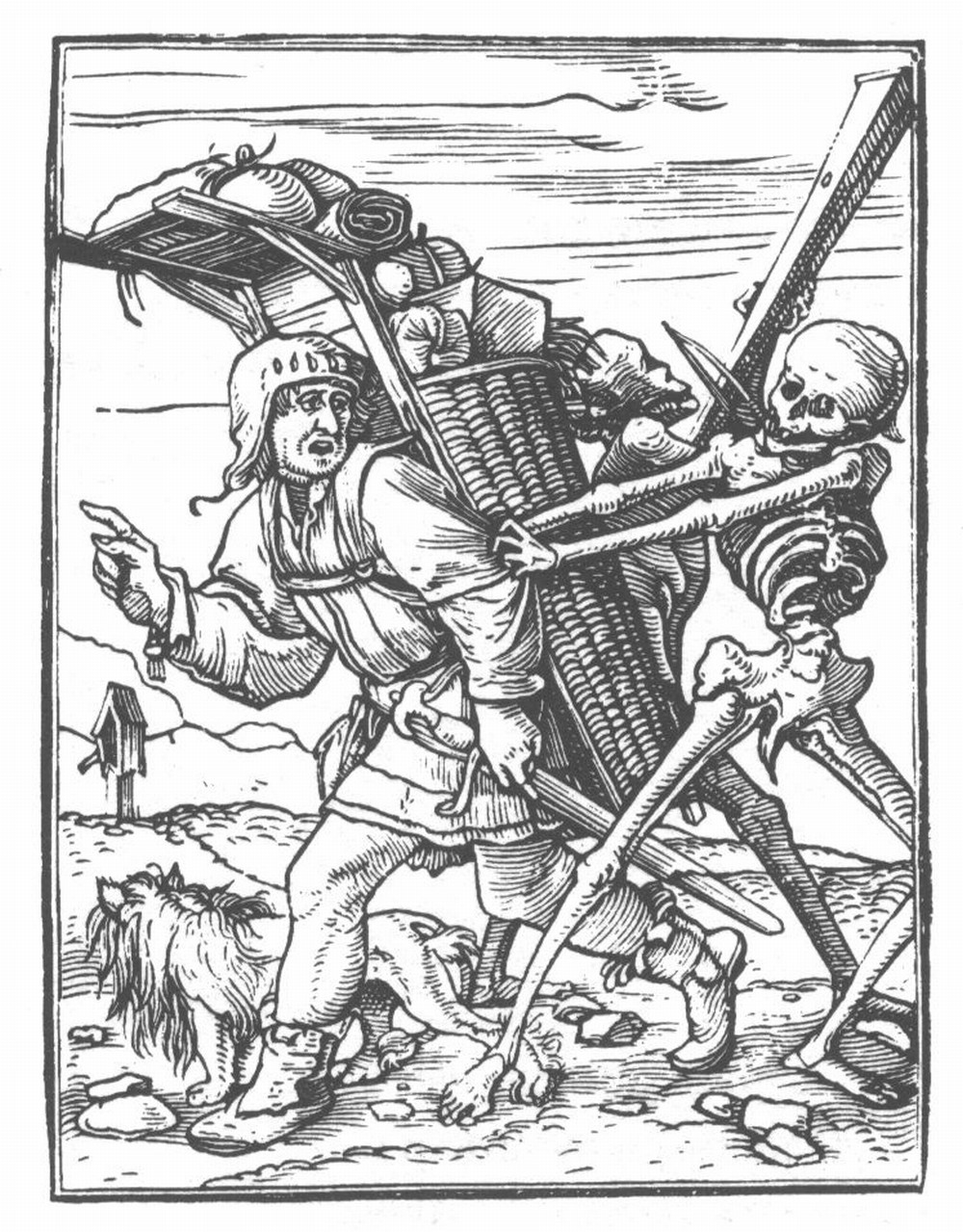
The Pedlar from Holbein's Simolachri, Historie, e Figure de la Morte (in Lyone Appresso Giovan Frellone, 1549)

Holbein's series shows the figure of "Death" in many disguises, confronting individuals from all walks of life. None escape Death's skeletal clutches, not even the pious. As Davis writes, "Holbein's pictures are independent dramas in which Death comes upon his victim in the midst of the latter's own surroundings and activities. This is perhaps nowhere more strikingly captured than in the wonderful blocks showing the plowman earning his bread by the sweat of his brow only to have his horses speed him to his end by Death. The Latin from the 1549 Italian edition pictured here reads: "In sudore vultus tui, vesceris pane tuo." ("Through the sweat of thy brow you shall eat your bread"), quoting Genesis 3.19. The Italian verses below translate: ("Miserable in the sweat of your brow,/ It is necessary that you acquire the bread you need eat,/ But, may it not displease you to come with me,/ If you are desirous of rest."). Or there is the nice balance in composition Holbein achieves between the heavy-laden traveling salesman insisting that he must still go to market while Death tugs at his sleeve to put down his wares once and for all: "Venite ad me, qui onerati estis." ("Come to me, all ye who [labour and] are heavy laden"), quoting Matthew 11.28. The Italian here translates: "Come with me, wretch, who are weighed down / Since I am the dame who rules the whole world:/ Come and hear my advice / Because I wish to lighten you of this load."

Two printings of Holbein's woodcuts are among the few books in the world that are confirmed to be bound in human skin. One is a simple brown leather binding with script from 1816, the other is a more artful binding from 1898. Both are in possession of Brown University.

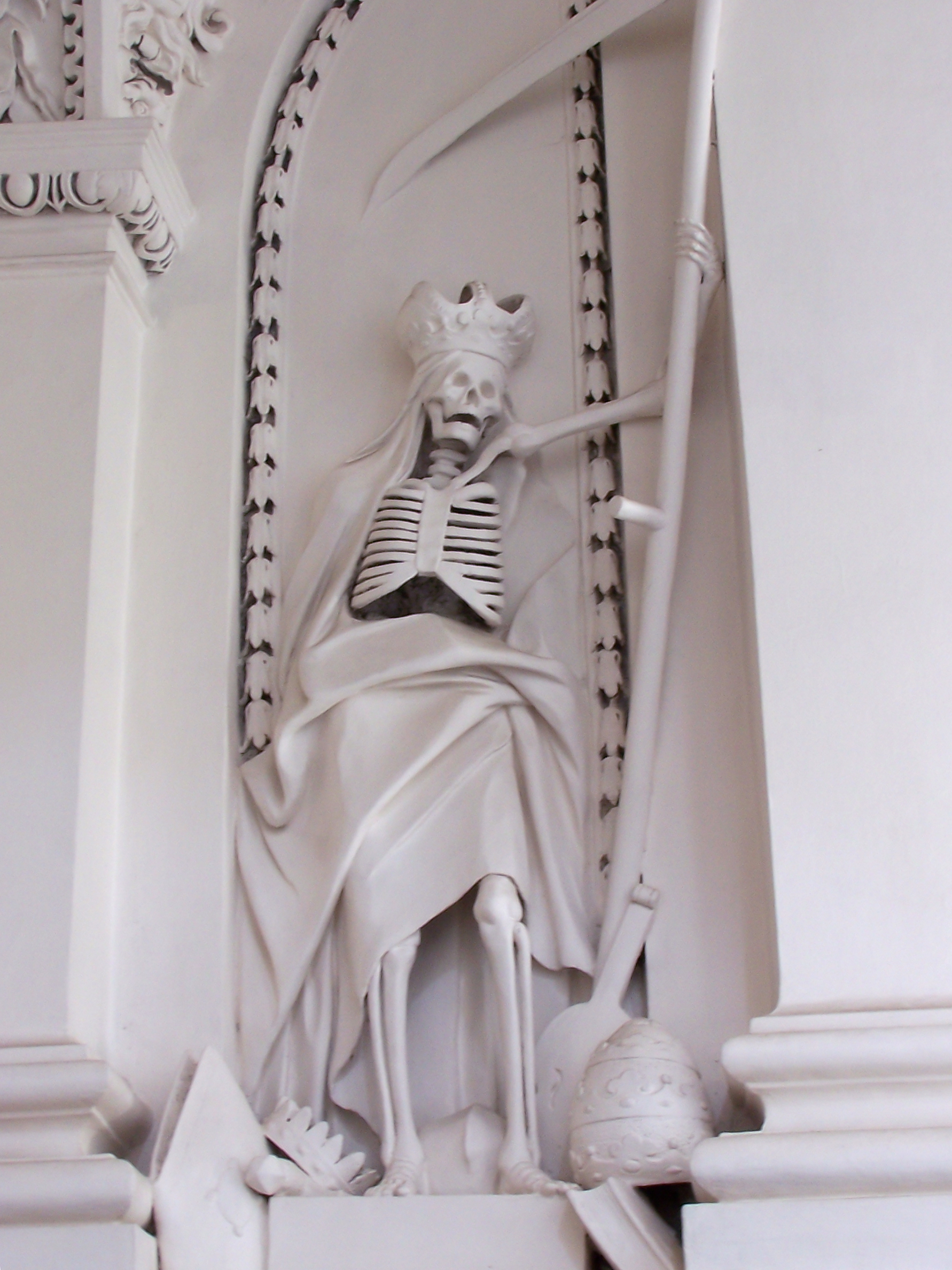
Danse Macabre, a reminder of the universality of death in the St. Peter and St. Paul church, Vilnius

== Textual examples of the Danse Macabre ==
The Danse macabre was a frequent motif in poetry, drama and other written literature in the Middle Ages in several areas of western Europe. There is a Spanish Danza de la Muerte, a French Danse Macabre, and a German Totentanz with various Latin manuscripts written during the 14th century. Printed editions of books began appearing in the 15th century, such as the ones produced by Guy Marchant of Paris. Similarly to the musical or artistic representations, the texts describe living and dead persons being called to dance or form a procession with Death.

Danse macabre texts were often, though not always, illustrated with illuminations and woodcuts.

There is one danse macabre text devoted entirely to women: The Danse Macabre of Women. This work survives in five manuscripts, and two printed editions. In it, 36 women of various ages, in Paris, are called from their daily lives and occupations to join the Dance with Death. An English translation of the French manuscript was published by Ann Tukey Harrison in 1994.

John Lydgate's Dance of Death is a Middle English poem written in the early 15th century. It is a translation of a French poem of the same name, and it is one of the most popular examples of the Danse Macabre genre.

The poem is a moral allegory in which Death leads a procession of people from all walks of life to their graves. The poem includes a variety of characters, including the emperor, the pope, the cardinal, the bishop, the abbot, the prioress, the monk, the nun, the doctor, the lawyer, the merchant, the knight, the plowman, the beggar, and the child. The poem is written in rhyme royal, a seven-line stanzaic form that was popular in the Middle Ages.

== See also ==
- Dancing mania
- Dancing Pallbearers
- La Calavera Catrina
- Medieval dance
- Memento mori
- The Skeleton Dance
- The Triumph of Death
- Vanitas
