= John of Kastav =

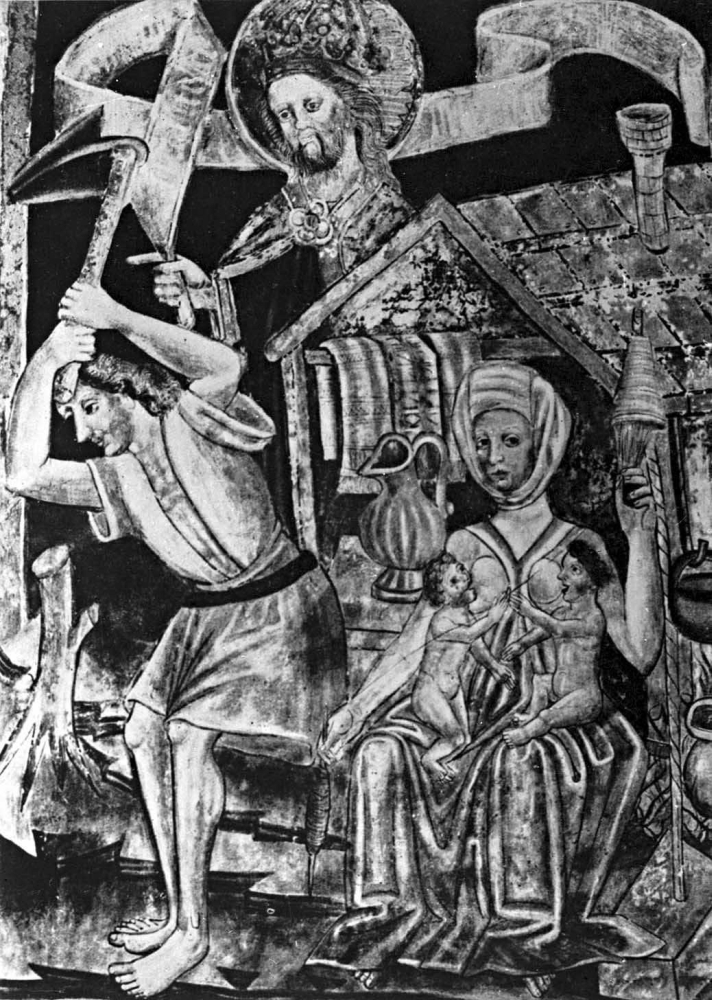
John of Kastav. Detail of the painting of the church in Hrastovlje. 1490

John of Kastav (Latin: Johannes de Castua; Croatian: Ivan iz Kastva; Slovene: Janez iz Kastva Italian: Giovanni da Castua) was a 15th-century Istrian artist, a native of Kastav (Croatia).

He painted the frescoes in the Church of the Holy Trinity, Hrastovlje, which included a famous Danse Macabre. According to the inscription, which identifies the artist as magister Johannes de Castua, the frescoes were commissioned by Tomić Vrhović, the parish priest of Kubed, and completed in 1490.
