= Francesco Traini =

Italian painter

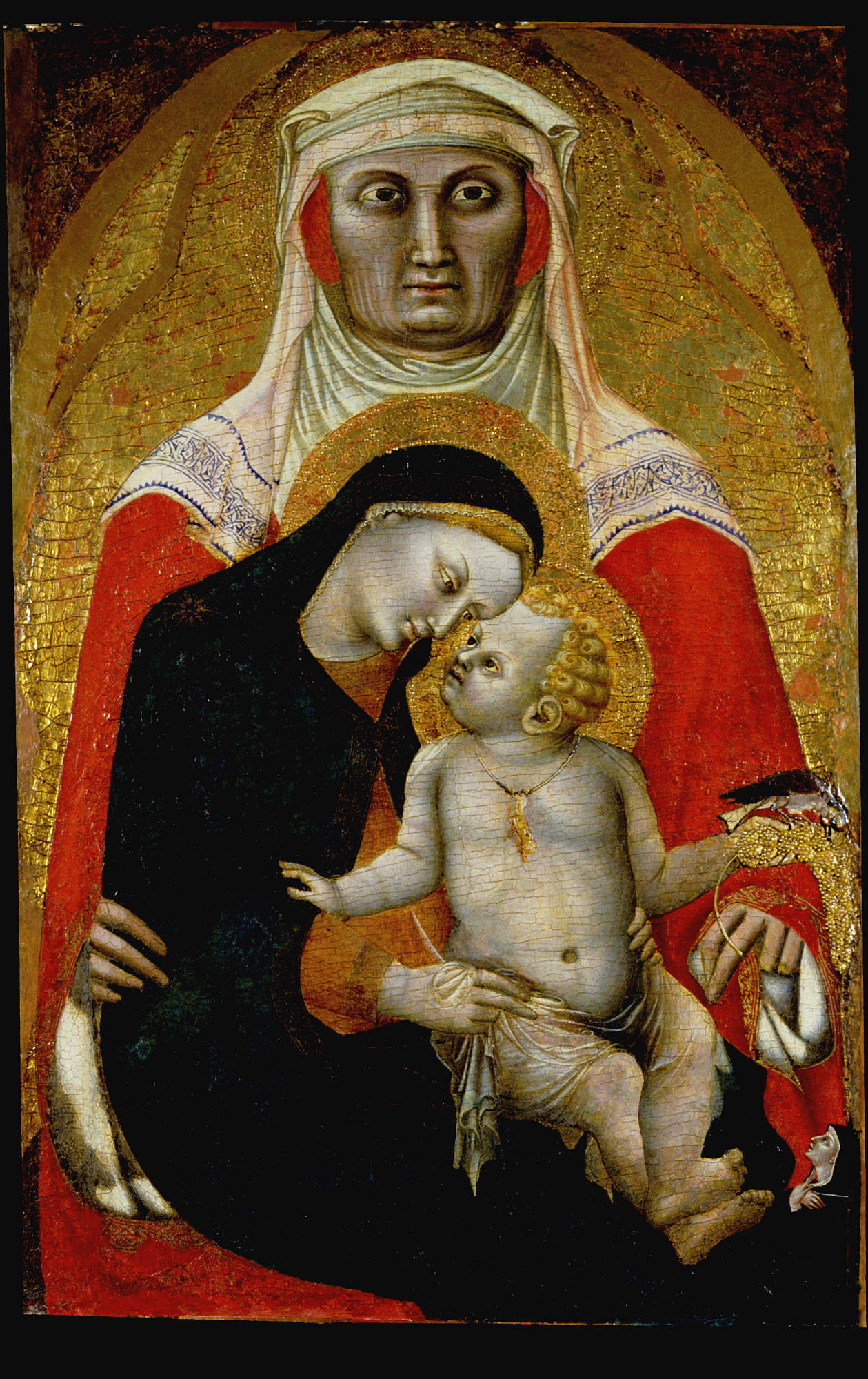
Madonna and Child with Saint Anne, 1340–45, Princeton University Art Museum

Francesco Traini was an Italian painter who was documented as working from 1321 to ca 1365 in Pisa and Bologna.

He appears to have been a follower of Andrea Orcagna to judge by only one work known to be by Traini: in 1345 he signed and dated a polyptych of the Pisan church of S. Caterina, showing Saint Dominic and a predella showing eight hagiographic scenes from the saint's life, now in the Museo Nazionale, Pisa. Most scholars attribute many of the huge frescoes of the Camposanto Monumentale in Pisa to Traini, including the Last Judgement, Inferno, Legends of the Hermits and, the famous Il Trionfo della Morte (the Triumph of Death).

There are Traini paintings at the Princeton University Art Museum, Ackland Art Museum, and an Allegorical Representation of Crucifixion with Saints Andrew and Paul at the Carnegie Art Museum.

== Triumph of Death ==
Though other scholars attribute it to Buonamico Buffalmacco, the Trionfo della Morte was used by the art historian Millard Meiss in 1951 as a fundamental example (the other being Andrea Orcagna's "Strozzi Altarpiece") to prove his theory on the influence of the Black Death on contemporary spirituality. He believed the painting, which displays the merciless omnipresence of death, to be a reaction to the horrors of the black death of 1348, as was the contemporaneous Totentanz ("Dance of Death") paintings in Germany. However, this fresco cycle was re-dated by Polzer to 1333-36 because of French contemporary paintings inspired by these ones and because of its Guelph political meaning, and Pisa was only Guelph for a short period in the mid 1330s; this meant, of course, that the frescoes cannot be an example of post-Black Death art as Meiss had originally suggested. In fact, since the painting was originally on the exterior wall of the town cemetery in Pisa, its function was just that of reminding the viewer of the certainty of death and the need for salvation through the church. The imagery is not, then, influenced by recent suffering and death caused by the plague but by mortality. Designed by a member of the Dominican College at Pisa, the fresco reflects the ideals of the order and its emphasis on judgement and the need for people to turn away from the temptations of the world; it promotes Mendicant poverty and cautions against earthly pleasure. It articulates a view of society, put forward by the Dominican Order in which sinfulness is the cause of suffering.

The background space is not treated naturalistically but establishes divisions between the different, symbolic groups of figures. Each spatial zone refers to a different idea being communicated such as temptation, judgment, death, and suffering. The landscape is treated symbolically. The rocky area represents the hermit's asceticism while the fertile area earthly pleasures.

American historian Barbara Tuchman examined the Traini fresco and described it thus: "A scroll warns that 'no shield of wisdom or riches, nobility or prowess' can protect them from the blows of the Approaching One. 'They have taken more pleasure in the world than in things of God.' In a heap of corpses nearby lie crowned rulers, a Pope in tiara, a knight, tumbled together with the bodies of the poor, while angels and devils in the sky contend for the miniature naked figures that represent their souls."

The frescoes of the Camposanto were unfortunately either severely damaged or destroyed by Allied air raids in World War II.

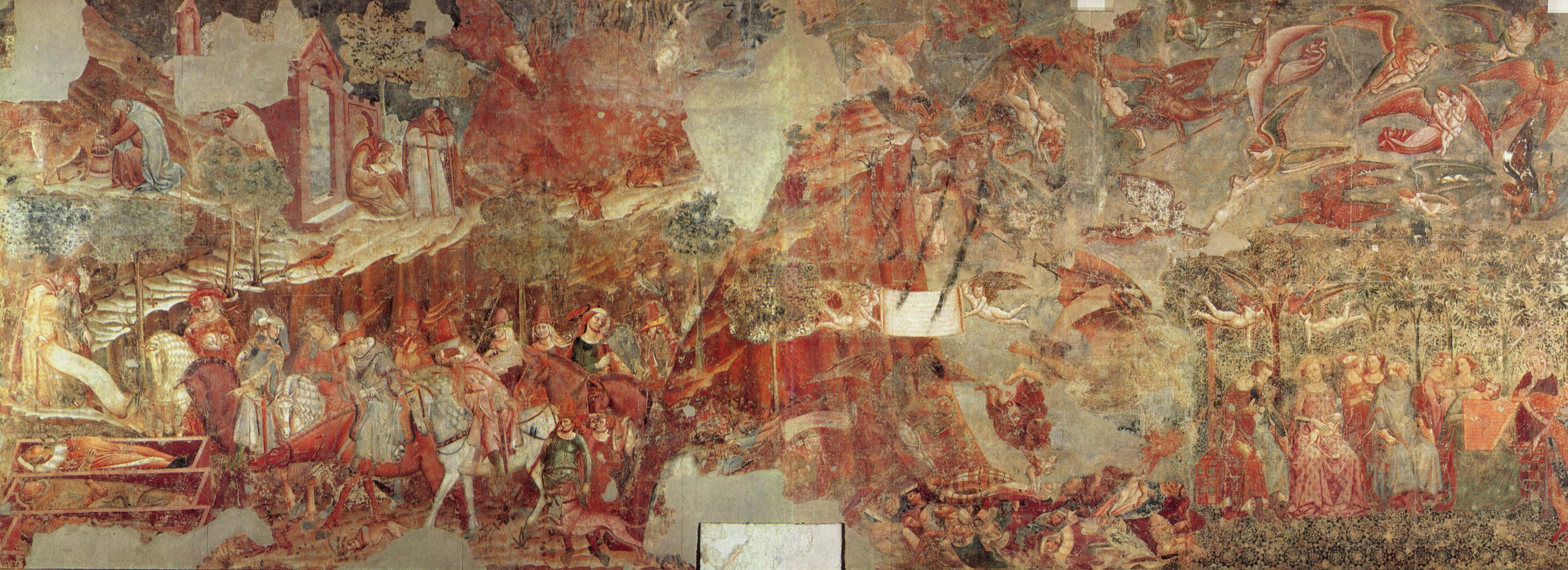
