= Guy Marchant =

French printer

Guy Marchant (also Gui or Guyot; in Latin Guido Mercator) was a printer of books, active in Paris from 1483 to 1505/1506. He had received a university education as a Master of Arts and is recorded as being a priest. He was succeeded by his nephew Jean Marchant (1504–1516).

He worked at first at an address in the Champ gaillart behind the Collège de Navarre. In 1493 he was at the sign of the Lily (ad intersignium floris lilii) in the rue Saint Jacques. From 1499 he worked at an address called Beauregard (in Bellovisu) behind the Collège de Boncourt where his nephew Jean continued to work. Marchant used six different printer's devices, several showing a shoemaker's workshop. Most of these devices have the motto Sola fides sufficit (where the word sola is a musical rebus with the notes Sol and La).

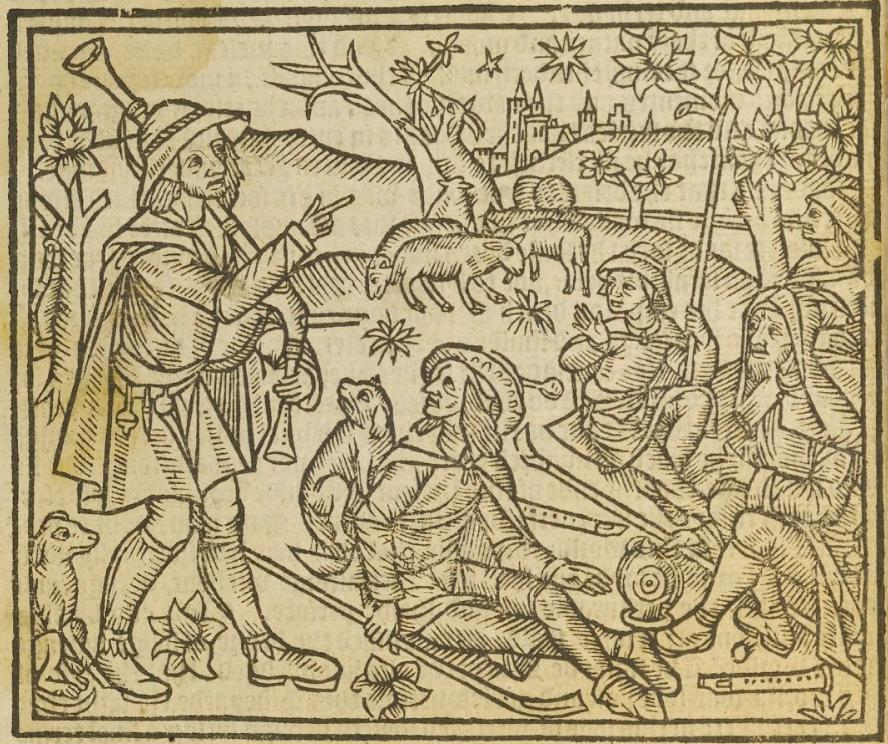
Kalendar of shepherds

The ISTC Database records about 190 editions printed by (or attributed to) the press of Guy Marchant up to the year 1500. A further 10 or 12 were printed in the sixteenth century before the business was taken over by Jean Marchant. Marchant's typographical material is enumerated in BMC volume 8.

Marchant's output was mainly of moderate-sized devotional texts but he is particularly famous for a series of works with 'magnificent woodcuts, including some of the finest illustrative work of the period'. These include five editions of the Danse macabre and seven editions of the Compost et kalendrier des bergers and an edition of the Calendrier des bergères. The Calendrier was translated into Scots English by Alexander Barclay (The Kalendayr of the shyppars, published by Antoine Vérard in 1503); an English version was produced in 1506.
