= Predloka =

Predloka Predlocca
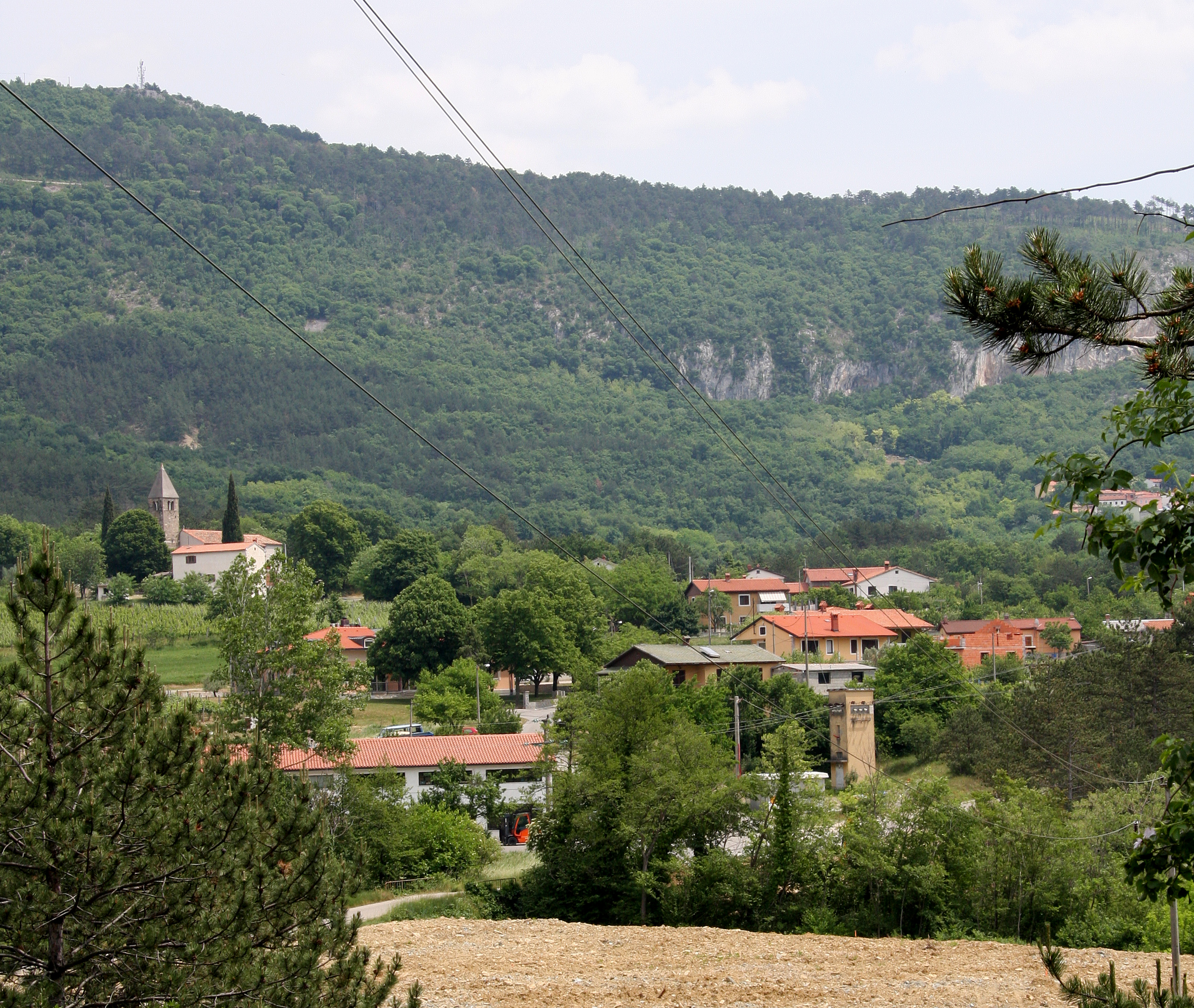

- Location in Slovenia
- Coordinates: 45°32′26.3″N 13°52′40.29″E
- Country: Slovenia
- Traditional region: Littoral
- Statistical region: Coastal–Karst
- Municipality: Koper

Area
  - Total: 0.21 km^{2} (0.081 sq mi)
- Elevation: 98.7 m (324 ft)

Population (2002)
  - Total: 74

Predloka (pronounced [pɾɛˈdloːka]; Italian: Predlocca) is a small village in the City Municipality of Koper in the Littoral region of Slovenia.

== History ==
Predloka was a hamlet of Loka until 1986, when it was administratively separated and made a settlement in its own right.

== Church ==
The parish church in the settlement is dedicated to John the Baptist.
