= Saint Gregory with Saints =

Peter Paul Rubens painting

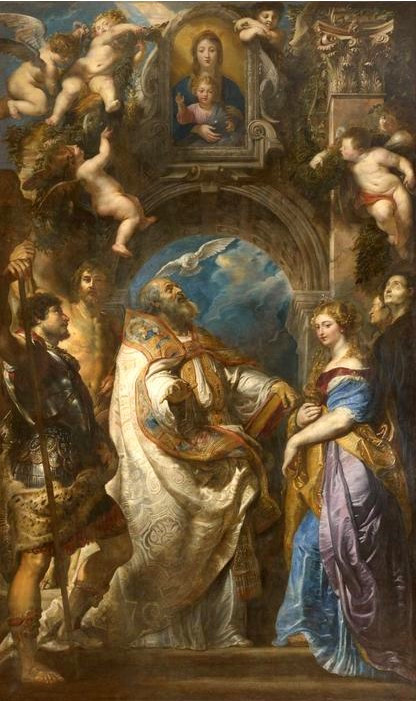

Saint Gregory with Saints or Pope Saint Gregory, Surrounded by Saints, Venerating the Miraculous Image of the Madonna and Child, known as the Santa Maria in Vallicella is a 1606-1607 oil on canvas painting by Peter Paul Rubens, now in the Musée de Grenoble. It is the first version of his Madonna della Vallicella and incorporates the six saints shown in that work's accompanying works.

== History ==
Commissioned by the Oratorians for the Chiesa Nuova in Rome, it shows that church's traditional founder Gregory the Great at the centre in a cope. To the left are saints Papias and Maurus and to the right saints Domitilla, Nereus and Achilleus - relics of all five are under that church's high altar. However, it was only briefly in that church. Rubens repatriated it to Antwerp for his mother's funerary chapel, from which it was looted by French Revolutionary troops and added to their national collection. It was then transferred from there to its current home on 15 February 1811.

The museum's curator Alexandre Debelle acquired four preparatory drawings for the work in Brussels in 1858. In January 1935 the painting left the musée de Grenoble for the only time to date for a three-month exhibition at the Petit Palais in Paris opened by President Albert Lebrun, appearing on the show's publicity posters. Early in the 1990s the height of the new museum was tailored to match the painting's height.
