= Madonna della Vallicella =

Painting by Peter Paul Rubens

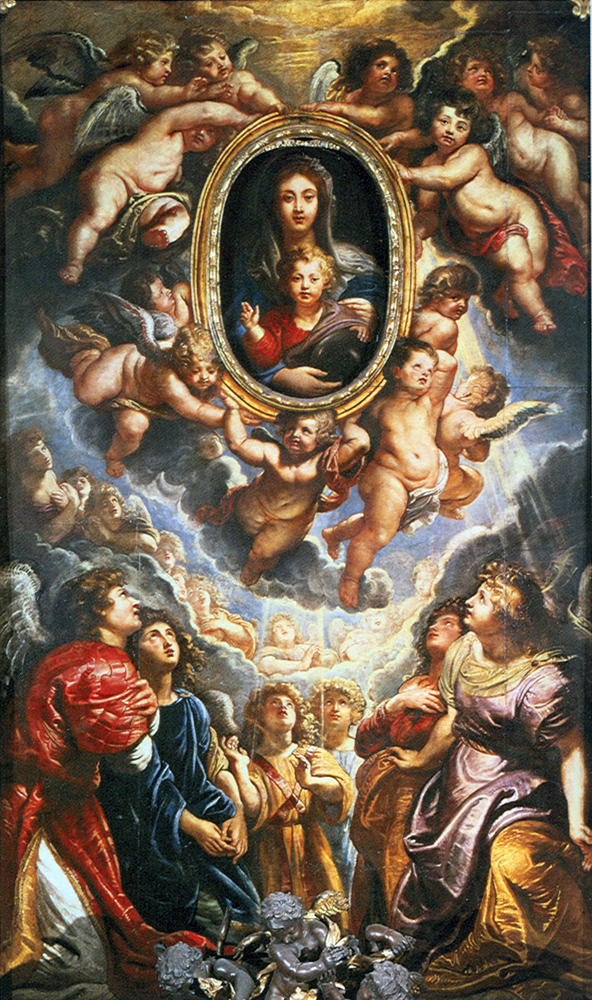
- Artist: Pieter Paul Rubens
- Year: c. 1606–1608
- Medium: oil on slate
- Dimensions: 425 cm × 250 cm (167 in × 98 in)
- Location: Santa Maria in Vallicella, Rome

The Madonna della Vallicella is an oil-on-slate painting produced between 1606 and 1608 by Peter Paul Rubens. It is his second confirmed commission in Rome, after his now-lost painting cycle for Santa Croce in Gerusalemme.

== History ==
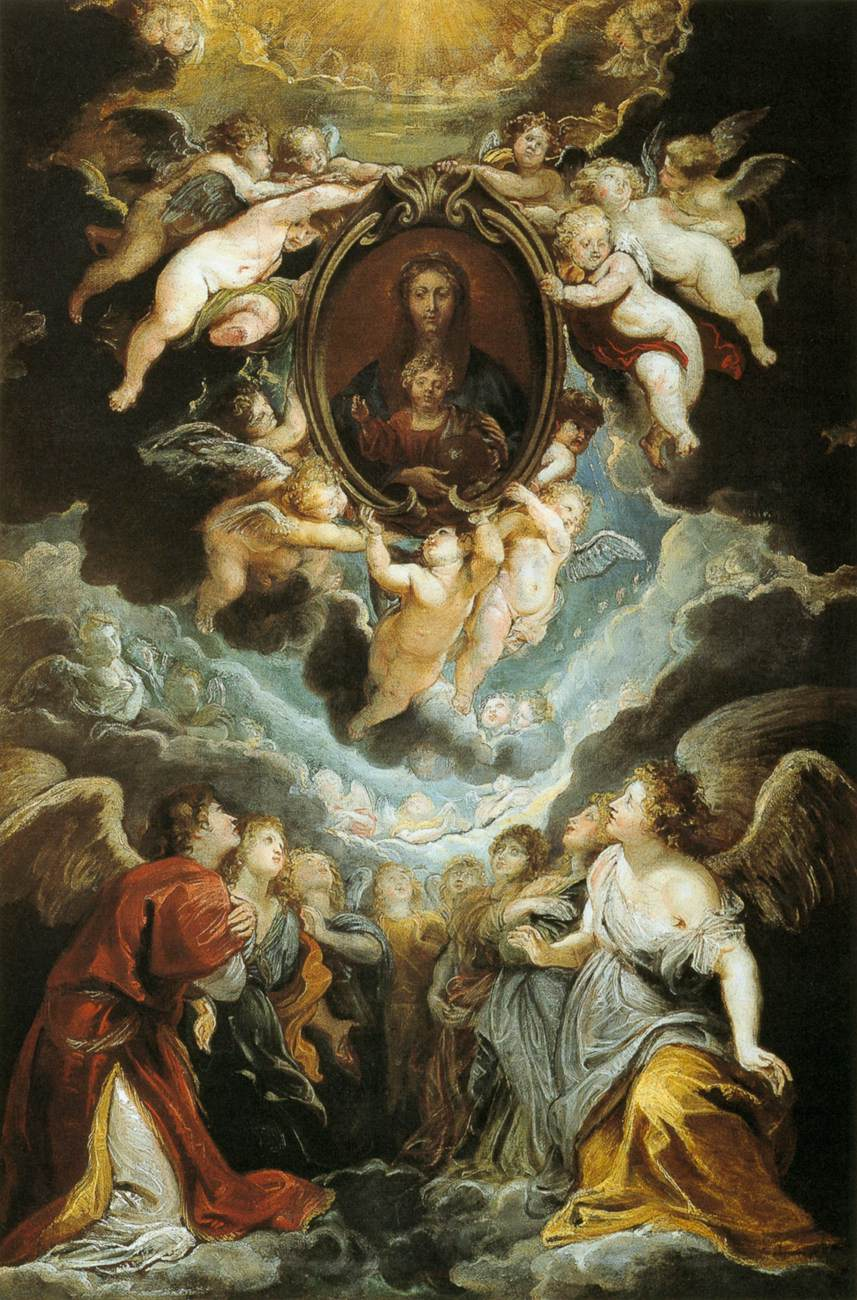
Sketch of the central altar panel (Academy of Fine Arts Vienna).

The painting was produced as the high-altarpiece for the church of Santa Maria in Vallicella in Rome (also known as the Chiesa Nuova, or "New Church." Its name refers to an ancient miraculous icon of the Nicopeia (bringer of victory) or Kyriotissa (enthroned) type known as the Madonna vallicelliana. Rubens reconstructed this image, surrounded by concentric circles of adoring angels and cherubs. On a copper plate placed over the Madonna della Vallicella, Rubens painted an additional Madonna with the Baby Jesus Giving Benediction that mirrors the sacred icon it covers. It's possible to raise the copper plate with a mechanism of pulleys and cords. In the central panel, space seems to expand out of the confines of its frames, a common theme in Baroque painting.

Rubens made a first version on canvas, Saint Gregory with Saints, but it must not have satisfied his clients for how light glared on its surface. So, he painted a new version on a slab of slate, a material with different reflective properties that eliminated the initial inconvenience.

In the altar niche, Madonna della Vallicella forms a triptych with two other paintings on chalkboard panels that are placed on the nearby walls. Pope Gregory I and Papias and Maurus on the left and Saints Domitilla, Nereus and Achilleus on the right. The Chiesa Nuova also possesses reliquaries of the depicted saints. The choice of the paintings in the triptych perhaps suggests that Rubens was influenced by a similar composition choice made by Annibale Carracci in the Chapel Salviati of San Gregorio Magno al Celio for Saint Gregory at Prayer only a few years before.

Rubens, in fact, distanced the two side paintings of saints from the central altar of the church. The side paintings are therefore turned toward the central panel with the venerated Madonna della Vallicella. Their placement directs the devotional gazes of Pope Gregory and Saint Domitilla toward the altar. The paintings of the Chiesa Nuova are the only works Rubens made in Rome that remained in the original locations.

== Altar gallery ==
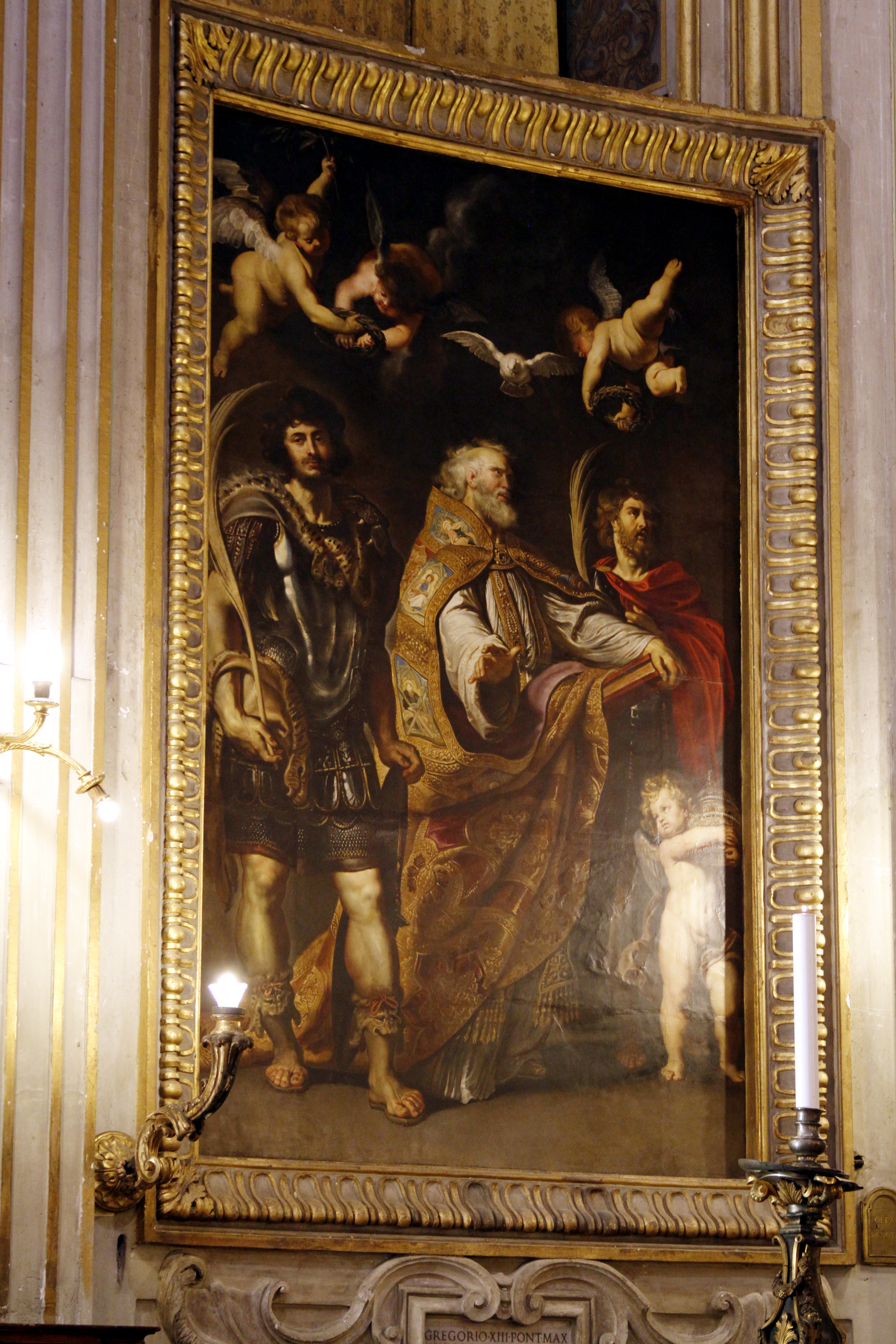
Left side, Pope Gregory the Great with the Saints Papias and Maurus.

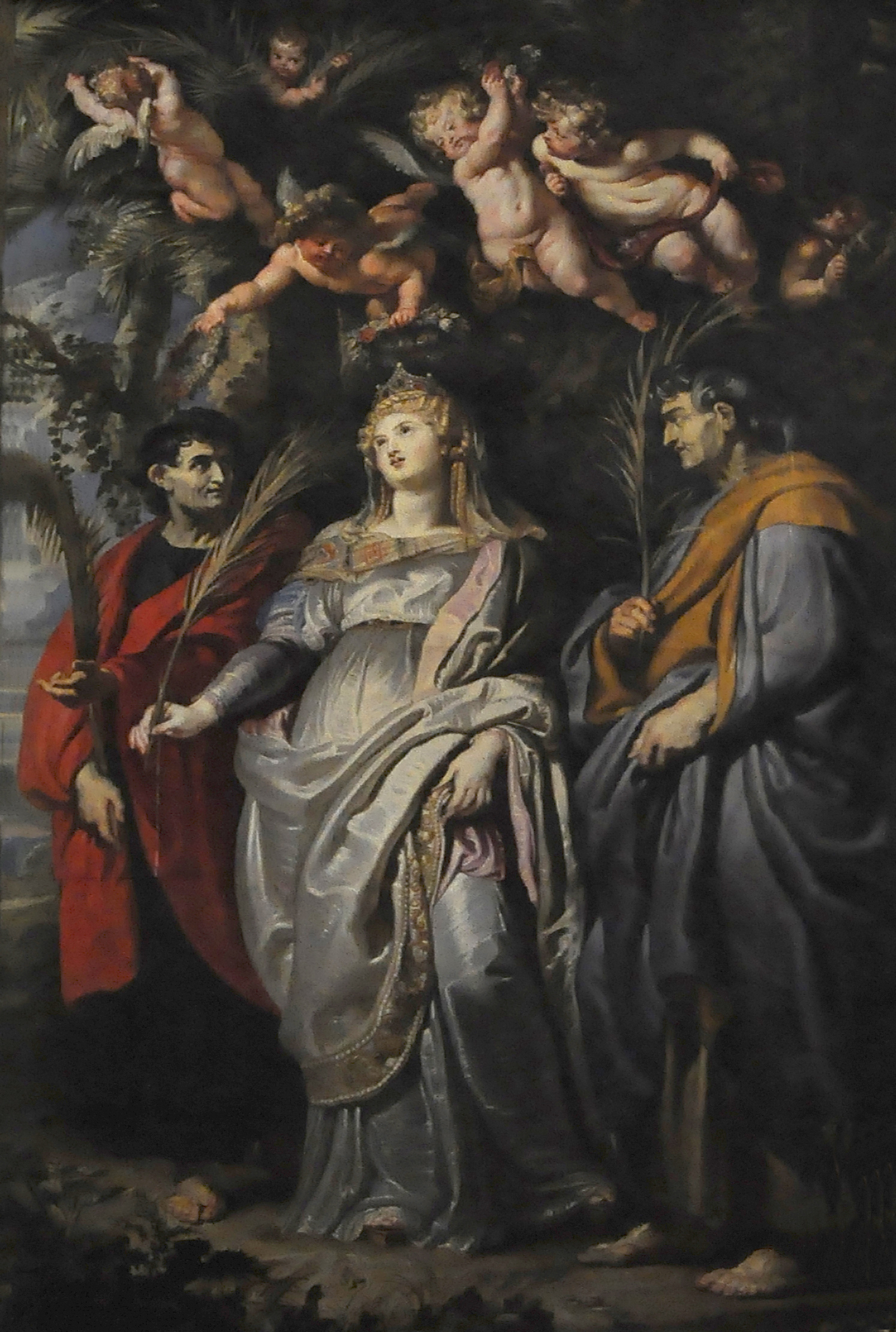
Right side, Saint Domitilla with Saints Nereus and Achilleus.

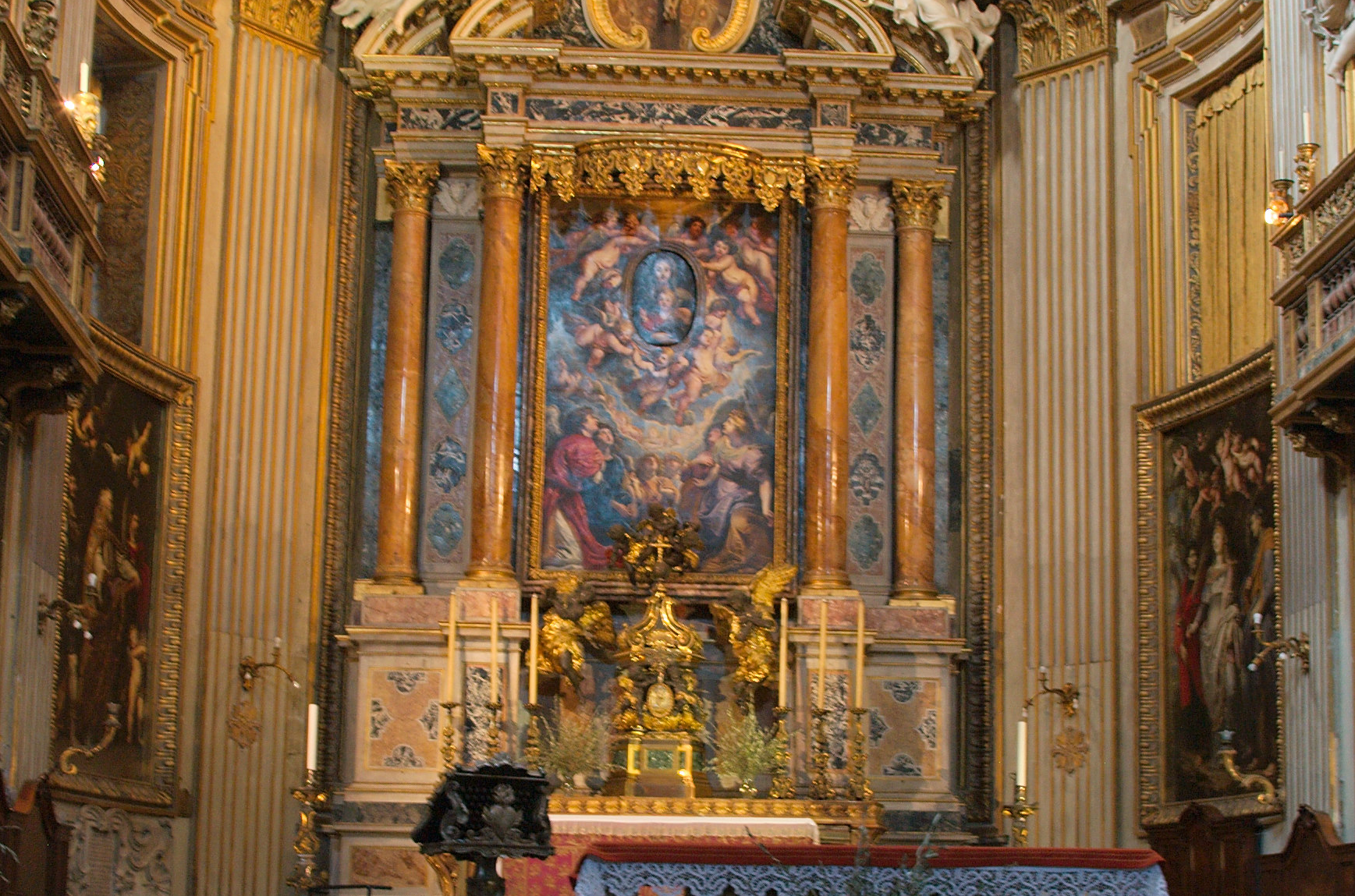
The three paintings together in the chancel of the Chiesa Nuova.
