= Oratorio dei Filippini =

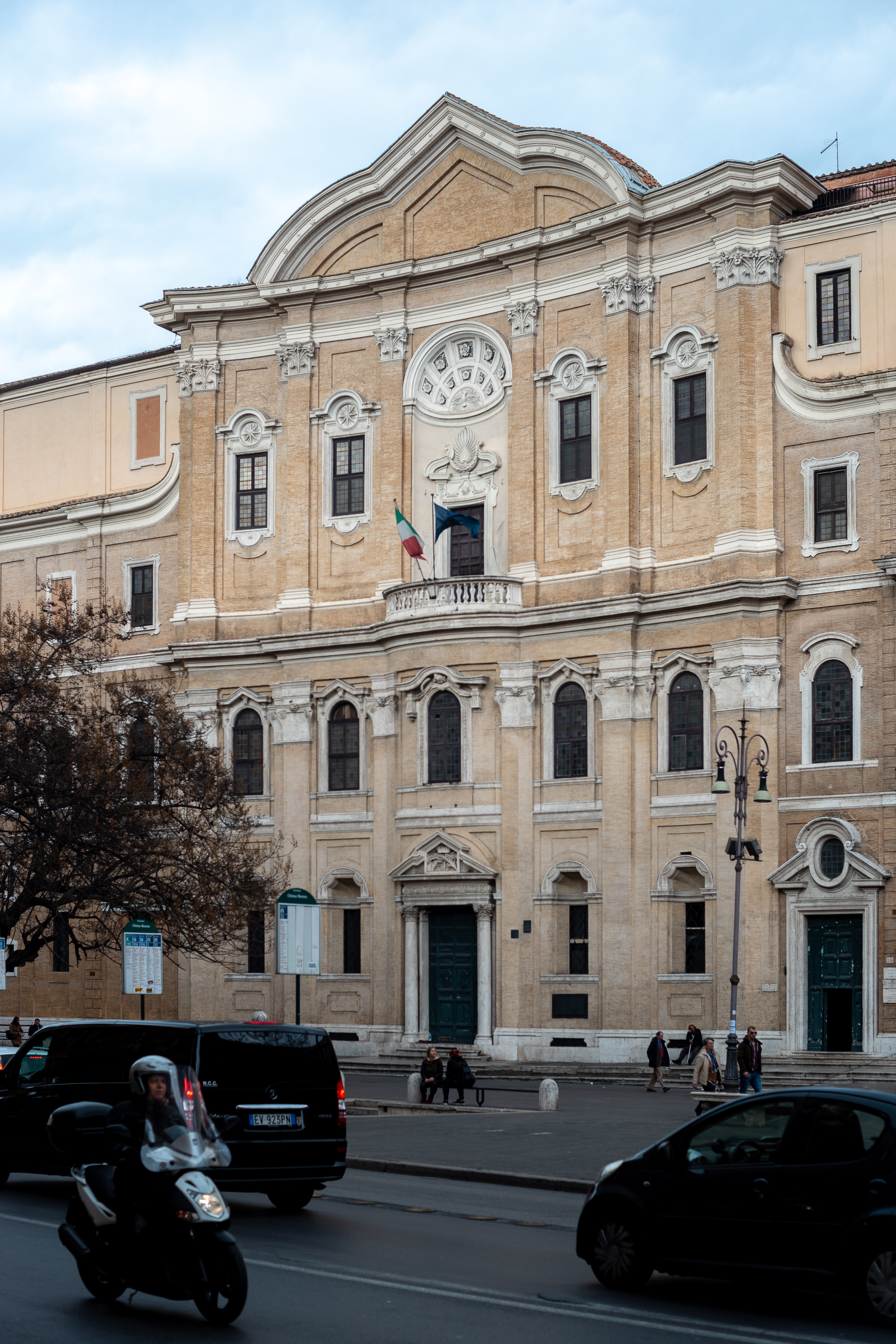
- The facade of the oratory
- Click on the map for a fullscreen view
- 41°53′54″N 12°28′07″E
- Location: Rome
- Country: Italy
- Denomination: Roman Catholic

Architecture
- Architect: Francesco Borromini
- Architectural type: Church
- Groundbreaking: 1637
- Completed: 1650

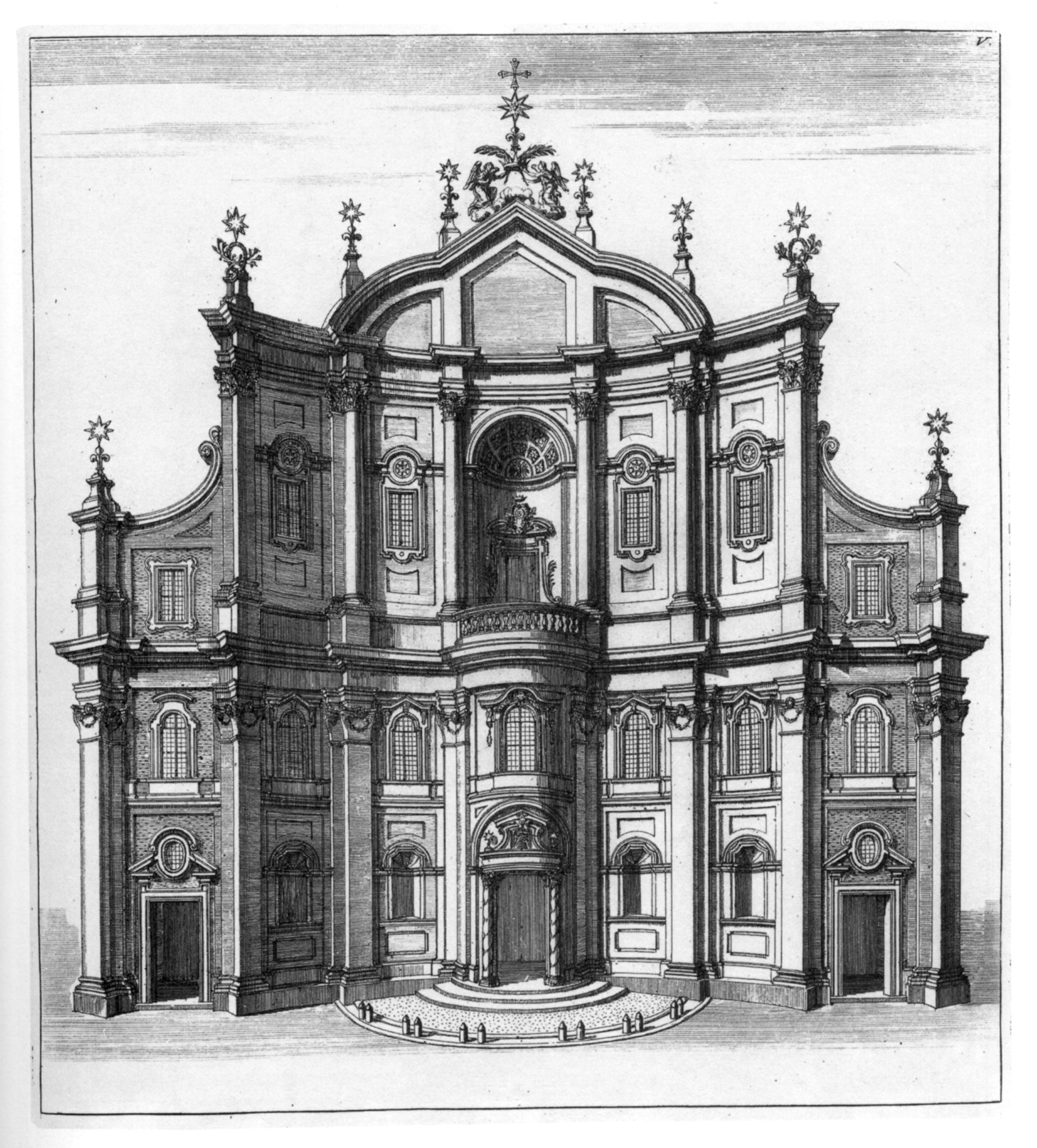
The facade of the oratory (1720 engraving)

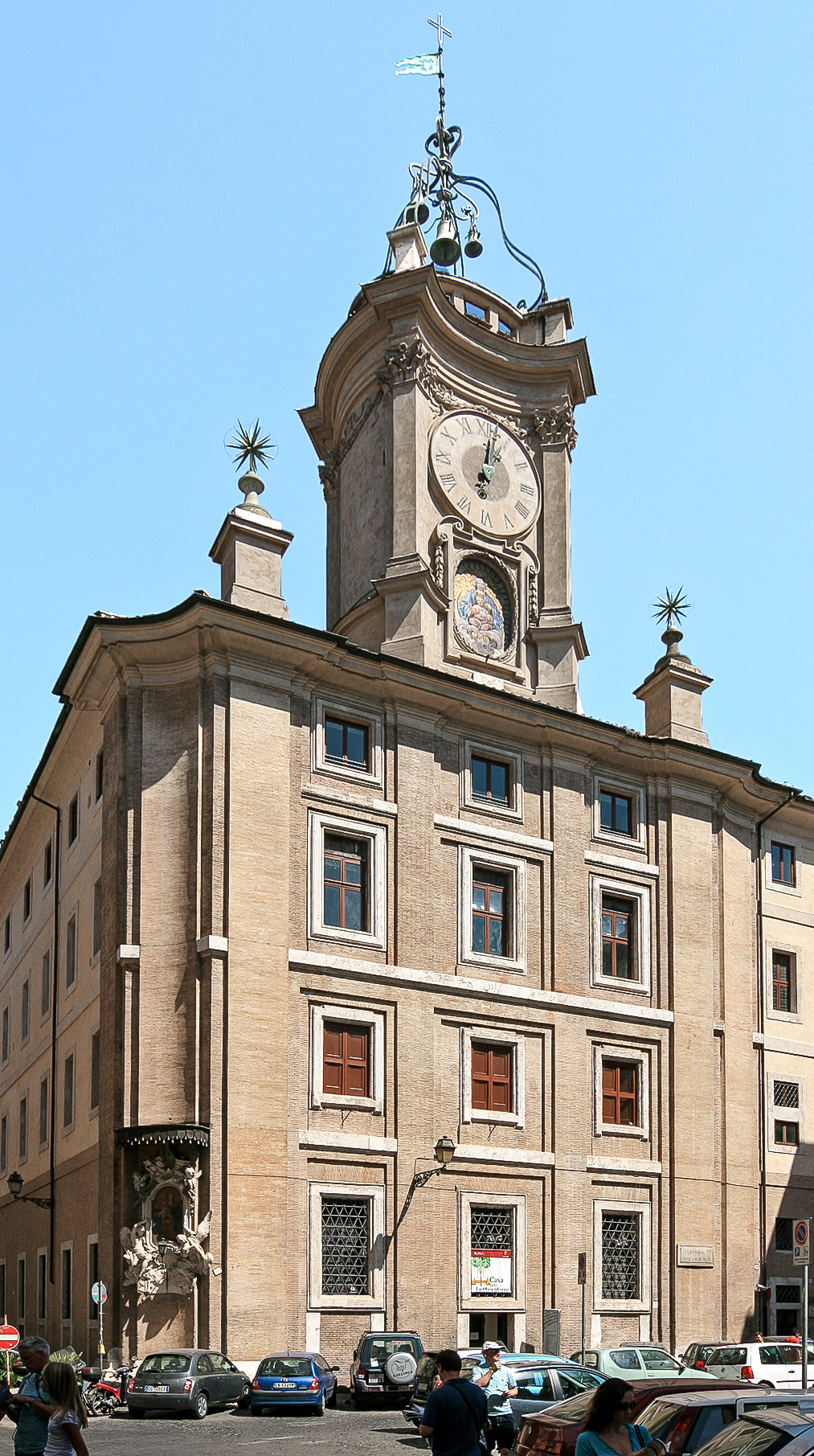
The turret with a clock, by Borromini.

The Oratorio dei Filippini (Oratory of Saint Philip Neri) is a building located in Rome and erected between 1637 and 1650 under the supervision of architect Francesco Borromini, in his distinctive style. The oratory is adjacent to the Chiesa Nuova Santa Maria in Vallicella, the mother church of the congregation. In front of the two sides was a small closed square, now integrated in the Corso Vittorio Emanuele II.

== History ==
The congregation of the Filippini already had one of the most well-decorated Baroque churches in Rome, and the order had planned to build an oratory, as well as residential quarters, adjacent to the church of Santa Maria in Vallicella (Chiesa Nuova) located in crowded central Rome. Originally, Ortario dei Filippini was also meant to be a place for the Filippini to practice their own, unique, inventive style of prayer. Borromini won a competition for designing the structure against many including Paolo Maruscelli. He was employed in the task for 13 years, often a testy process. By 1640, the oratory was in use, and by 1643, the library, called the Biblioteca Vallicelliana, was complete. Borromini later became occupied by the construction of many components of the building such as the façade, two courtyards, the refectory, recreational rooms, the Biblioteca Vallicelliana, and the clock tower. Camillo Artucci became the designer after Borromini left the job in 1650 due to conflicts with the Fillipini Congregation.

== Description ==
Exterior

Though the facade is large compared the structures behind it, it was meant to be second best to the adjacent church in terms of materials and size.

The facade provides a summary of Borromini's characteristics of innovations style, both austere and technically rigorous. The main body is divided into five parts by pilasters following a concave curve. In the central part, a dynamic appears between the lower level, whose curve moves outward, and the upper level which curves inward. This panel-clad façade of the Oratorio dei Filippini was designed to mimic the human body with open arms for those wanting to worship there. The façade is decorated with upper and lower pilasters with Corinthian capitals.

At the corner of the oratory, on the Piazza dell'Orologio, Borromini raised a turret with a clock (1647–1649).

Interior

Inside the oratory is articulated by half columns and a complex rhythm of pilasters.

Today, a room in the Oratorio dei Filippini, known as the Sala Borromini, functions similarly to a town hall as meetings and debates are held there.

The Ortario dei Filippini features a library called Biblioteca Vallicelliana which is distinguished by a staircase with a depiction of a Bellonian priest. In the staircase leading up to the library one can admire the full scale plaster models of Alessandro Algardi's reliefs of The Encounter of Attila and Pope Leo (the finished marble is in St. Peter's Basilica) and The Miracle of Saint Agnes (executed by Algardi's assistants Ercole Ferrata and Domenico Guidi; the marble version, destined to become the main altarpiece in Sant'Agnese in Agone was never made).

The shape of the music hall inside Oratorio dei Filippini lends itself to acoustics and the distribution of sound. The long, rectangular design allows sound to bounce off of the walls and fill the room effectively. The high, curved ceiling pushes sound down to the audience below. This is important because the Filippini used music as an integral part of their prayer and worship.

== Bibliography ==
- Anthony Blunt, Vita e opere di Borromini, Laterza, Rome-Bari, 1983
- Paolo Portoghesi, Francesco Borromini, Elemond-Electa, Milan, 1990
- Joseph Connors, Borromini and the Roman Oratory, Style and Society, MIT Press, New York and Cambridge, MA, 1980
