= Saint Gregory at Prayer =

Painting by Annibale Carracci

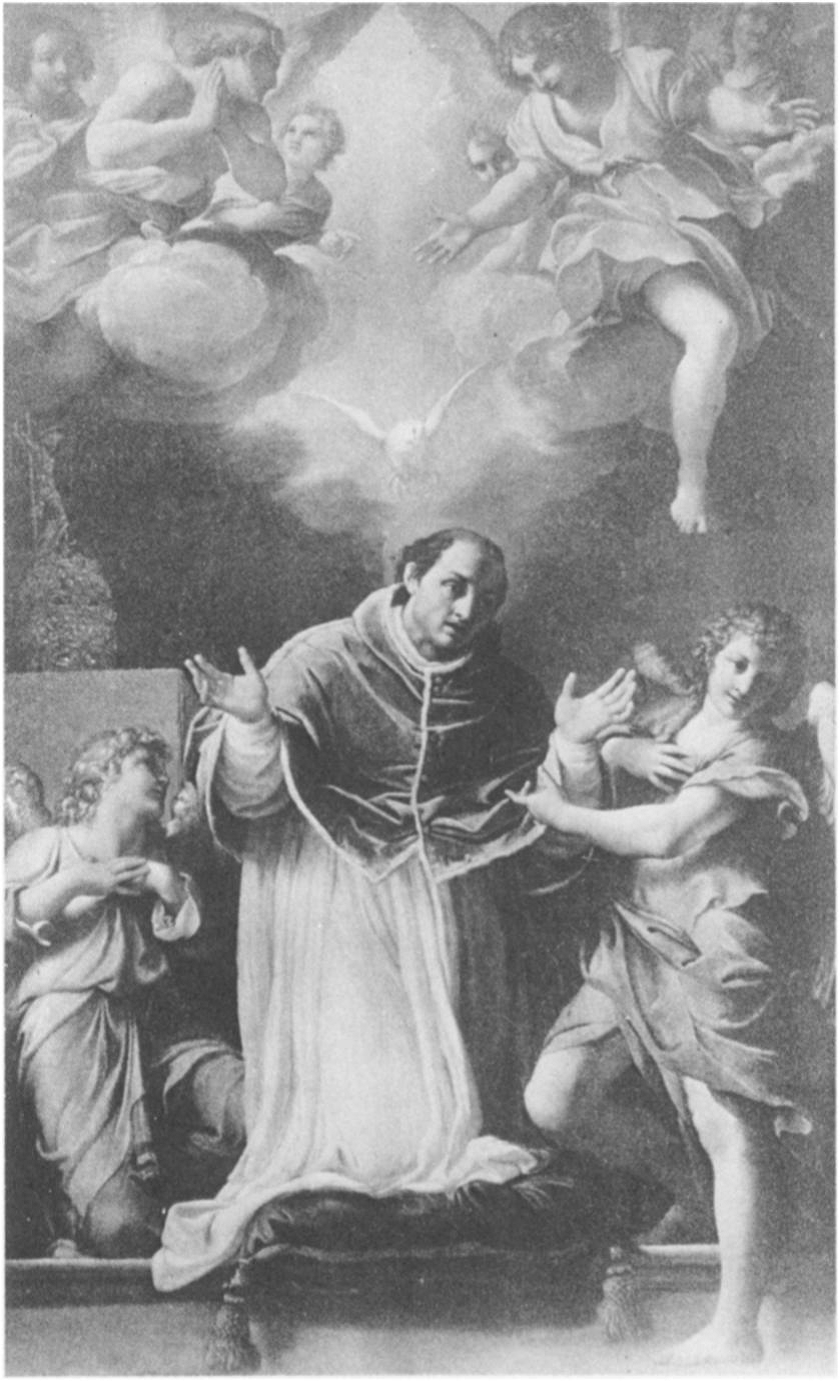
Saint Gregory at Prayer (c. 1600–1602) by Annibale Carracci

Saint Gregory at Prayer was an oil-on-panel painting by Annibale Carracci, showing the scene in Gregory the Great's life when an image of the Virgin Mary spoke to him while he prayed before it.

== History ==
It was commissioned by cardinal Anton Maria Salviati for the personal chapel he had had built at San Gregorio al Celio in Rome. It can thus only date to between his becoming commendatory abbot of the Camaldolese monastery at San Gregorio al Celio in 1600 and his death in 1602. The saint is shown looking towards a wall of the chapel on which then hung an icon of the Virgin Mary, an overlapping of imaginary and real space which involves the viewer in the space and time of the event shown in the painting and made the painting one of the earliest examples of Baroque illusionism.

The work was seized by French occupying forces in 1798 – its gap at San Gregorio has been filled by an anonymous copy of the work. However, whilst it was en route to Paris, Vincenzo Camuccini somehow acquired it in Genoa and sent it to Britain. There it was sold to a Lord Radstock and later entered the collections at Bridgewater House in London. It and many other works, including others by Annibale, were destroyed in May 1941 during the London Blitz.

== Description ==
The entire Salviati chapel reproduces this event: the praying Saint Gregory that dominated Annibale's panel, placed above the altar, was oriented (like today's copy) towards the left wall of the room, the wall on which is the Marian image of the miracle (what is visible now of this icon is the result of heavy, almost complete, late medieval repainting).

It was perhaps this compositional choice that inspired, a few years later, Rubens in the creation of the Triptych of the Vallicella, another text of fundamental importance for the nascent Baroque illusionism. Rubens, in fact, distanced the two side panels, with figures of saints, from the central panel, placed on the church's high altar. The side panels are therefore oriented toward the central panel, within which there is, again, an ancient and venerated icon, towards which the devout gazes of Saint Gregory the Great (another point of contact with the lost Celio panel) and Saint Domitilla are directed.

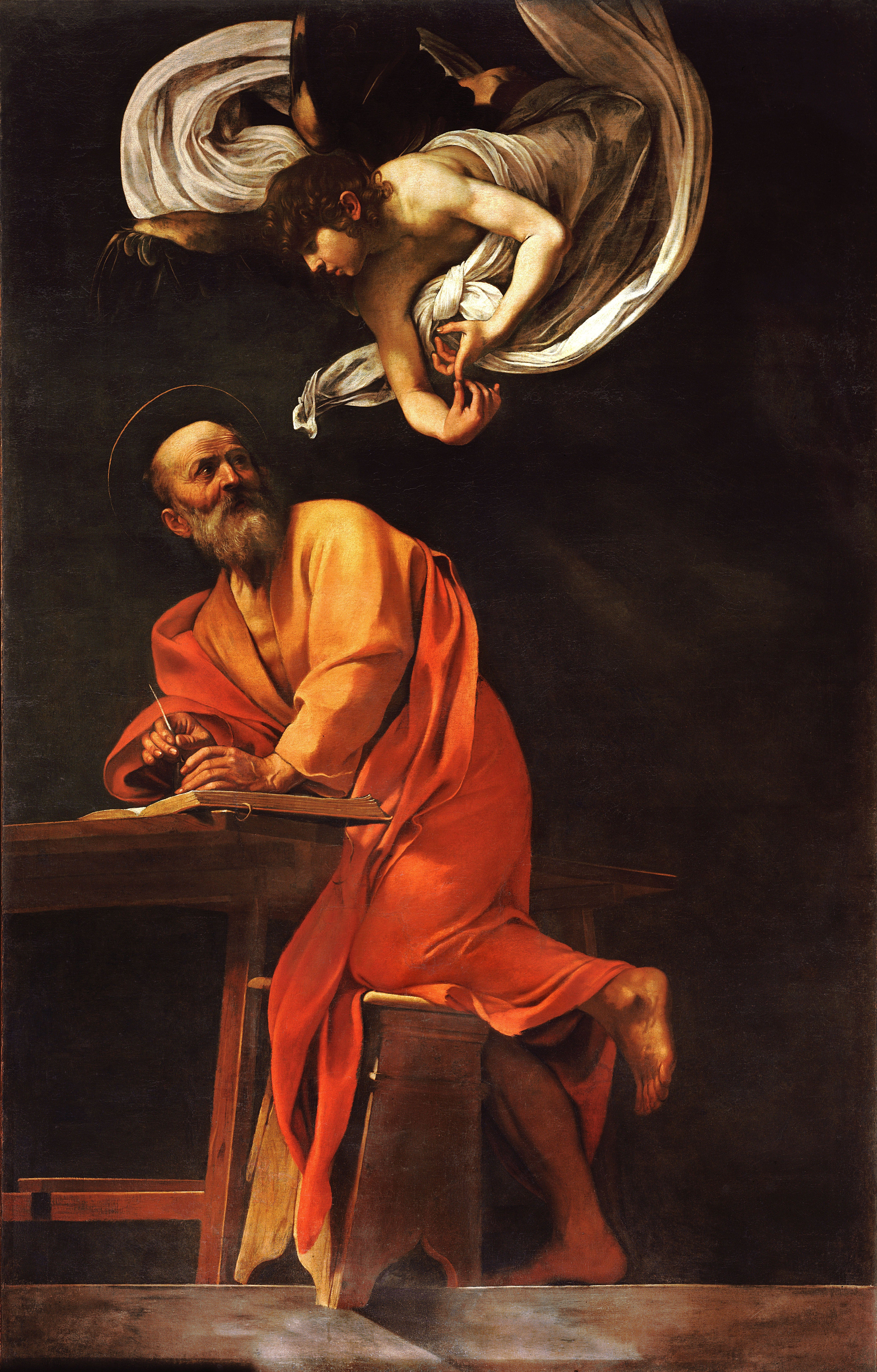
Caravaggio, The Inspiration of Saint Matthew, 1602, San Luigi dei Francesi, Rome

Annibale's desire to abolish the separation from physical reality was further emphasized by the strong projection of the cushion on which the praying saint kneels, which protrudes from the painted panel. This detail is associated with the famous detail of the stool in Caravaggio's "The Inspiration of Saint Matthew," which seems almost ready to fall off the canvas. Given the contemporaneity of the two paintings, it is believed that this similarity is not accidental and that it should be ascribed to the comparison between Annibale and Caravaggio that was taking place in those years on the Roman art scene.

From what can be seen in the preparatory drawing for "Saint Gregory" (preserved at Chatsworth House), Annibale's initial intention was probably to further accentuate the illusionistic play between fiction and reality. In the drawing, the saint and the angels flanking him look out from beyond an archway, simulating a fictitious opening that would have broken through the chapel wall. This choice, however, was abandoned in the final version of the work.

Another significant difference can be seen in the drawing compared to the panel actually painted by Annibale. The work, in fact, was intended as a depiction of Saint Gregory's prayer for the souls in purgatory: in the upper part of the drawing, a soul in purgatory, evidently saved by the saint's prayer to the Virgin, ascends to heaven. This iconographic option disappears in the painting. It has been hypothesized that this change was imposed by Cardinal Cesare Baronio, who succeeded Salviati as commendatory abbot of the Celio monastery, since the circumstance that Saint Gregory was interceding for the souls in purgatory on the occasion of the miraculous manifestation is considered false in Baronio's own Annales Ecclesiastici.

In addition to Saint Gregory praying, the composition also features two angels flanking him and another angelic group in the upper part of the panel. In the center, above Saint Gregory's head, is the dove of the Holy Spirit, a further seal of the miraculous event in progress. The painting denotes a moment of Annibale's renewed adherence to Correggio, which is especially evident in the grace of the angels.

Several copies of Annibale's lost panel are documented (in addition to the one currently in the Salviati Chapel on the Celio) and some engravings. Among the latter, the best is likely that of the Swiss engraver Jacob Frey (1681–1752), who was active in Rome for a long time.

== Related works ==
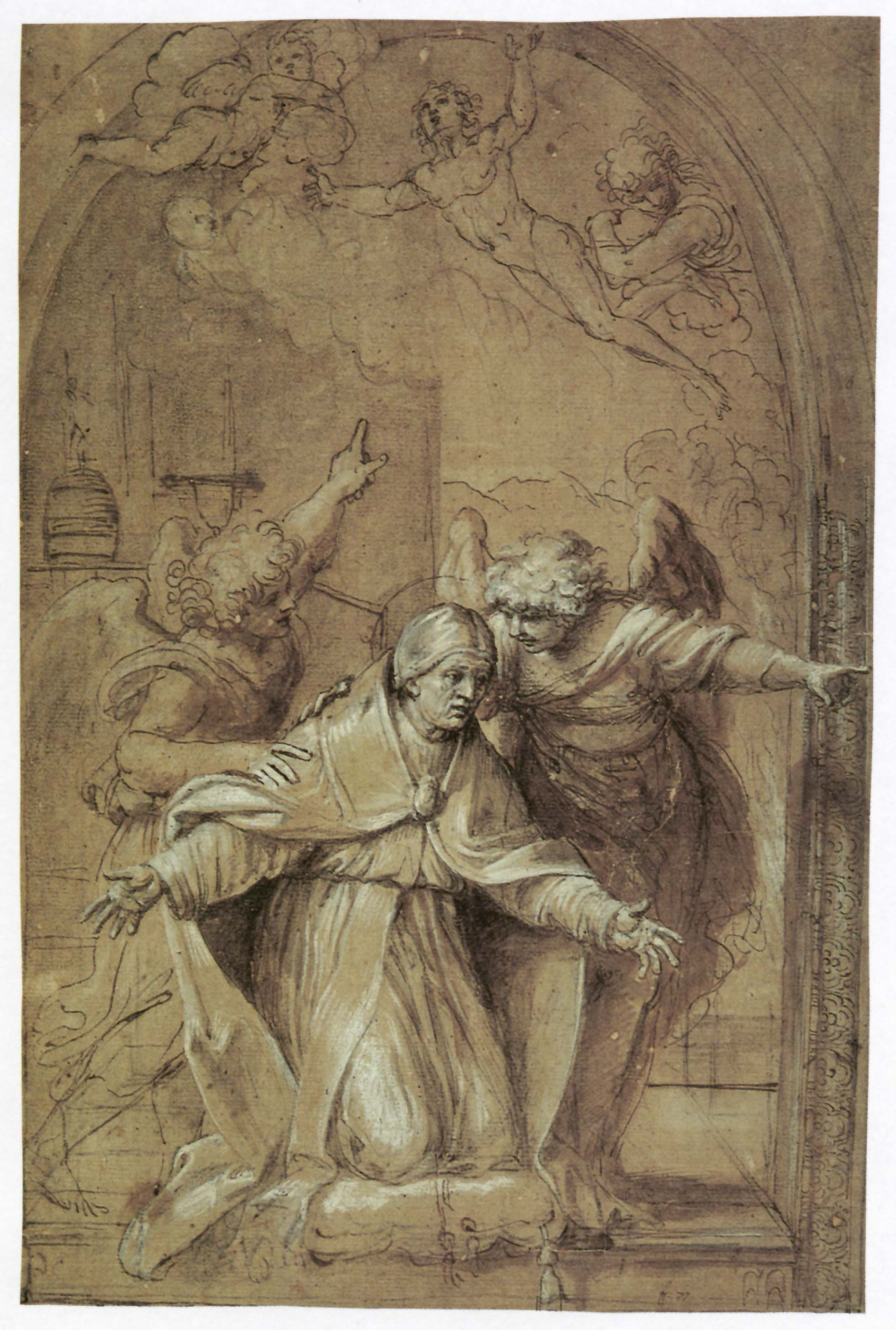
Annibale Carracci, St. Gregory prays for the souls in purgatory, Chatsworth House. Preparatory drawing, which Annibale only partly followed

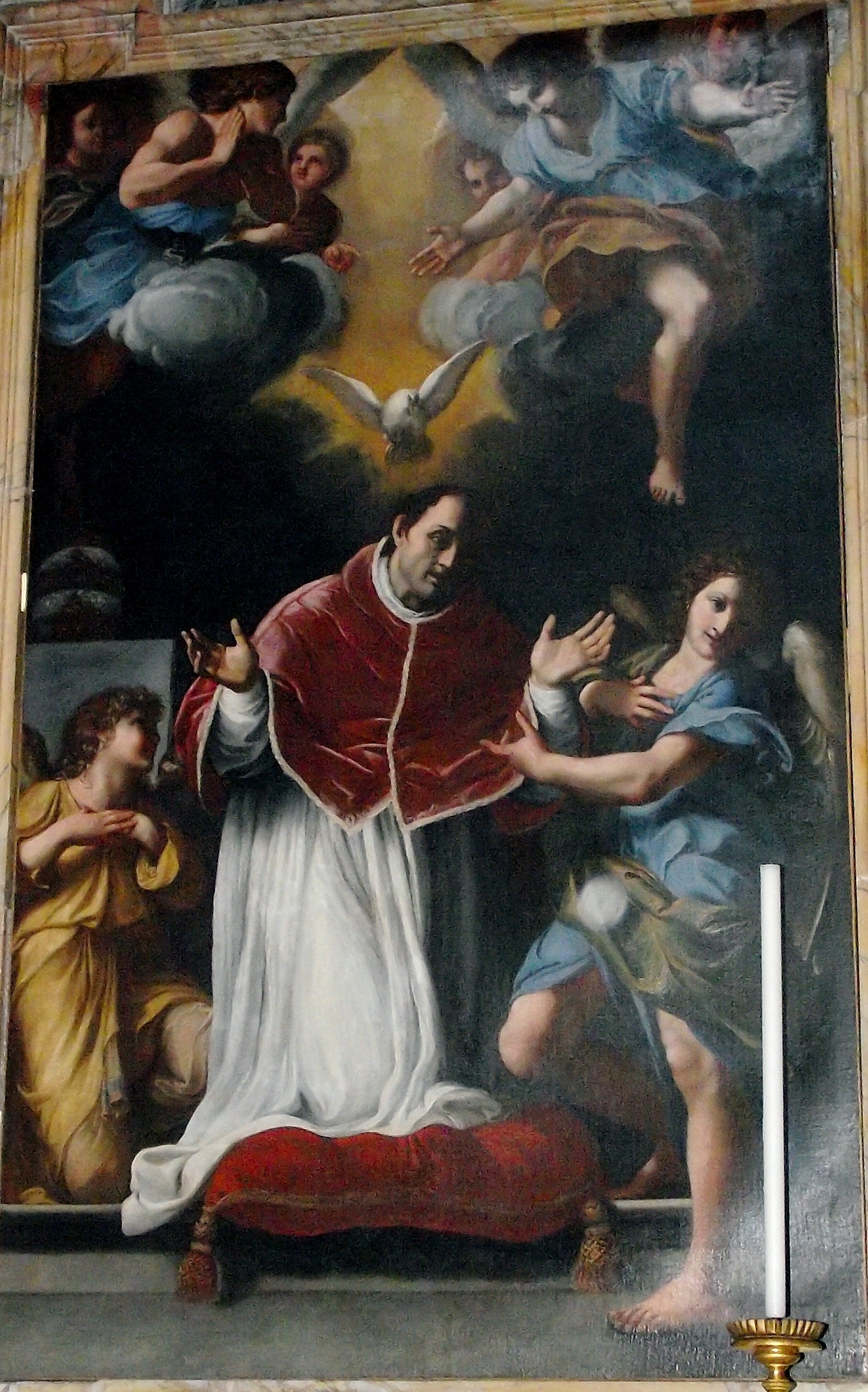
Saint Gregory at Prayer, the anonymous copy that today occupies the altar of the church of San Gregorio al Celio where the lost painting by Annibale was originally located
