= Santa Maria in Vallicella =

- Church of Saint Mary in the Little Valley
- Chiesa Nuova, Santa Maria in Puteo Albo
- Chiesa di Santa Maria in Vallicella
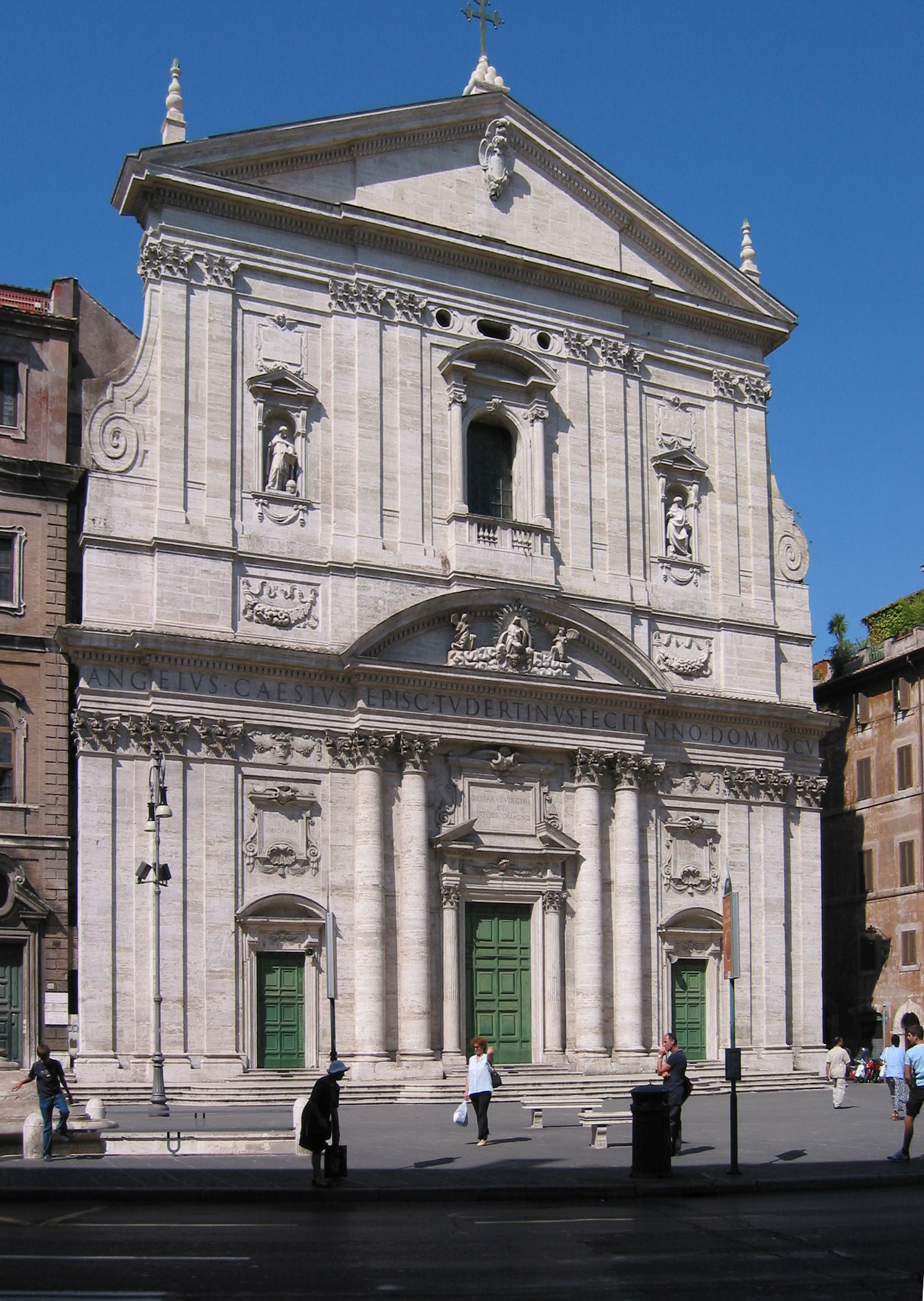
- Facade
- Click on the map for a fullscreen view
- 41°53′55″N 12°28′9″E
- Location: Via di Governo Vecchio 134, Rome
- Country: Italy
- Language: Italian
- Denomination: Catholic
- Tradition: Latin Church
- Religious institute: Oratorians
- Website: vallicella.org

History
- Status: titular church
- Founded: 1575
- Dedication: Pope Gregory I and Mary, mother of Jesus
- Consecrated: Saint Philip Neri

Architecture
- Architectural type: Baroque
- Completed: 1599

Administration
- Diocese: Rome

Santa Maria in Vallicella, also called Chiesa Nuova, is a church in Rome, Italy, which today faces onto the main thoroughfare of the Corso Vittorio Emanuele and the corner of Via della Chiesa Nuova. It is the principal church of the Oratorians, a religious congregation of secular priests, founded by St Philip Neri in 1561 at a time in the 16th century when the Counter Reformation saw the emergence of a number of new religious institutes such as the Jesuits, the Theatines, and the Barnabites. These new congregations were responsible for several great preaching churches built in the Centro Storico, the others being Sant'Andrea della Valle (Theatines), San Carlo ai Catinari (Barnabites), and The Gesù and Sant'Ignazio (Jesuits).

== History ==
By tradition, St. Gregory the Great built the first church on the site. By the 12th century, it was dedicated to Santa Maria in Vallicella ("Our Lady in the Little Valley").

In 1575, Pope Gregory XIII recognised Neri's group as a religious Congregation and gave them the church and its small attached convent.

St. Philip Neri, helped by Pier Donato Cardinal Cesi and Pope Gregory XIII, had the church rebuilt, starting in 1575. When Pierdonato died, his brother Angelo Cesi, Bishop of Todi, continued his family's patronage. Initially the architect was Matteo di Città di Castello, but he was replaced later by Martino Longhi the Elder. The nave was completed in 1577, and the church was consecrated in 1599. The facade, designed by Fausto Rughesi, was completed in 1605 or 1606. The Cesi heraldry is still evident in the church.

== Interior ==
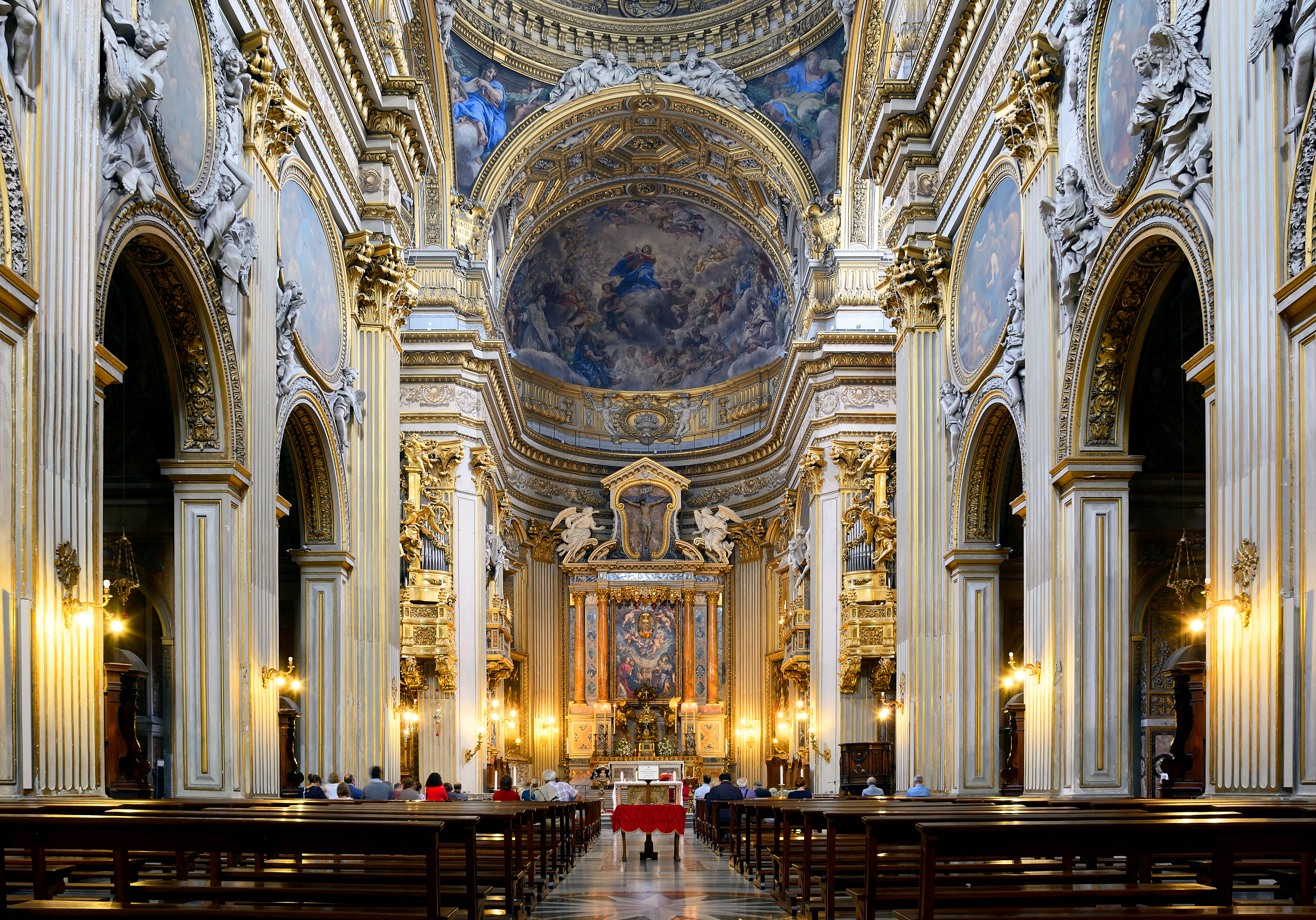
Nave

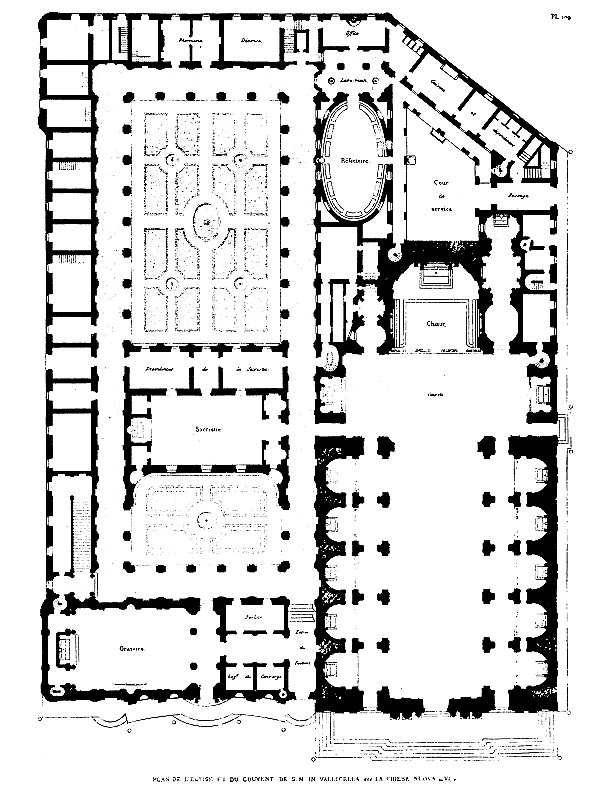
Plan of the Church and Monastery

The ground plan follows the Counter-Reformation design of churches established at the Gesù; a single main nave with transepts and side chapels, leading towards the High Altar. Neri had intended that the interior be plain with whitewashed walls but it was filled by patrons with various artistic works, mainly during the period from 1620 to 1690, including masterworks by some of the principal artists of those decades in Rome. It is renowned for its altarpieces by Barocci, Pietro da Cortona's ceilings, and the Rubens altarpiece on an unusual slate, canvas and copper support.

Pietro da Cortona's decorations include the 'Trinity' in the dome (painted 1647–1651). The prophets 'Isaiah', 'Jeremiah', 'Daniel' and 'Ezechiel' in the four pendentives were painted in 1655–56 and 1659–60 along with his fresco of the 'Assumption of the Virgin' adorning the apse. There is an implied visual continuum between the dome and the apse frescoes aided by the fact that there is no dome drum; the assumpting Virgin (in the apse) raises her eyes towards Heaven and the Father (in the dome) extends his hand as if bestowing His blessings upon her.

Cortona's nave vault fresco of the 'Miracle of the Madonna della Vallicella' was executed in 1664–65. This is clearly set within an elaborate gold frame, a quadro riportato, and is painted with a Venetian influenced view of di sotto in su (from below to above). His designs for the vault decoration around the painting, with elaborate white and gilt stucco work incorporating figurative, geometrical and naturalistic elements, were carried out by Cosimo Fancelli and Ercole Ferrata. The walls of the nave and transept, as well as the presbytery ceiling, have canvases of Episodes of the Old and New Testament are by Lazzaro Baldi, Giuseppe Ghezzi, Daniele Seiter, Giuseppe Passeri, and Domenico Parodi.

=== Chapels ===
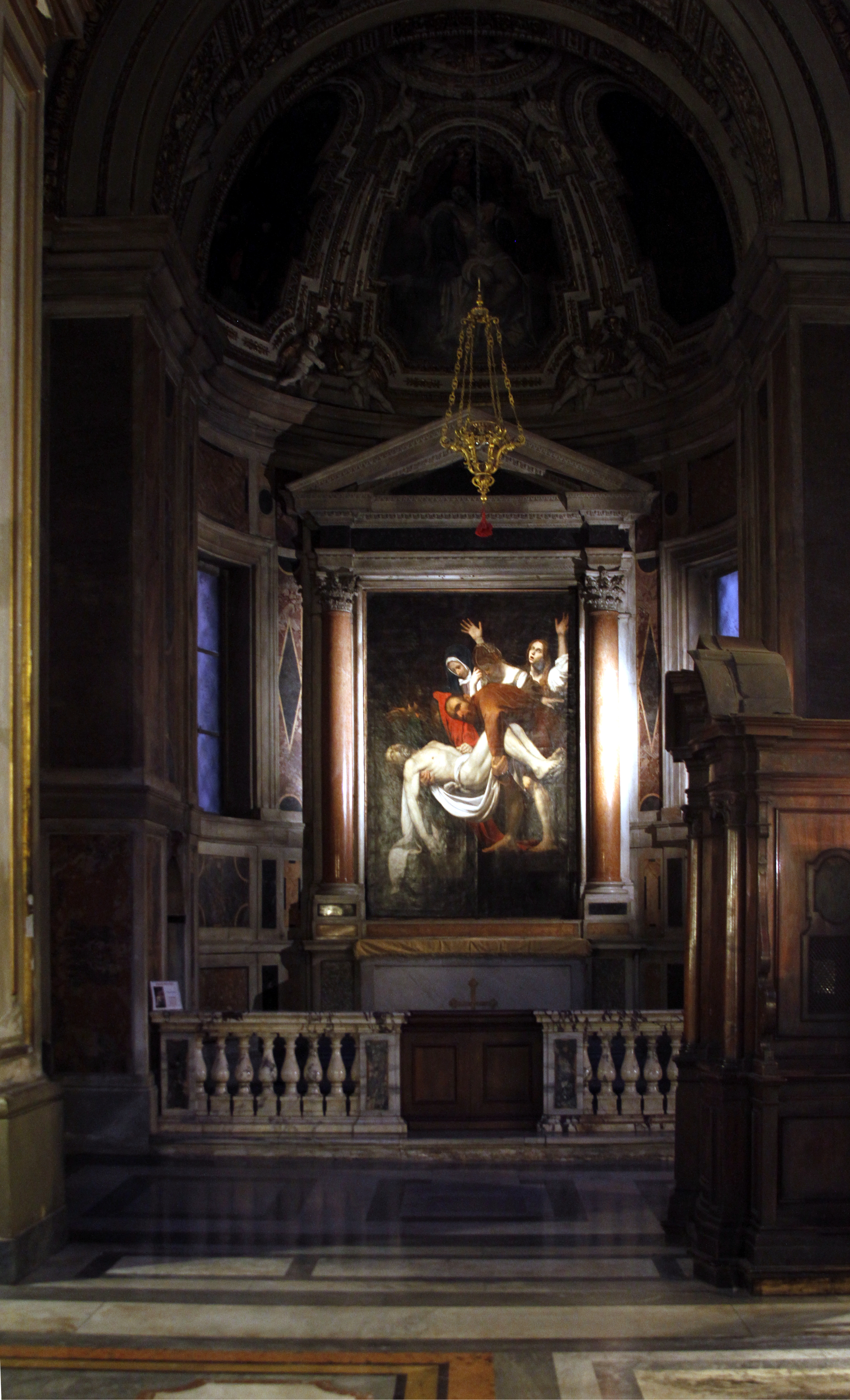
Copy of Caravaggio's Deposition by Michael Koeck in Capella della Pietà

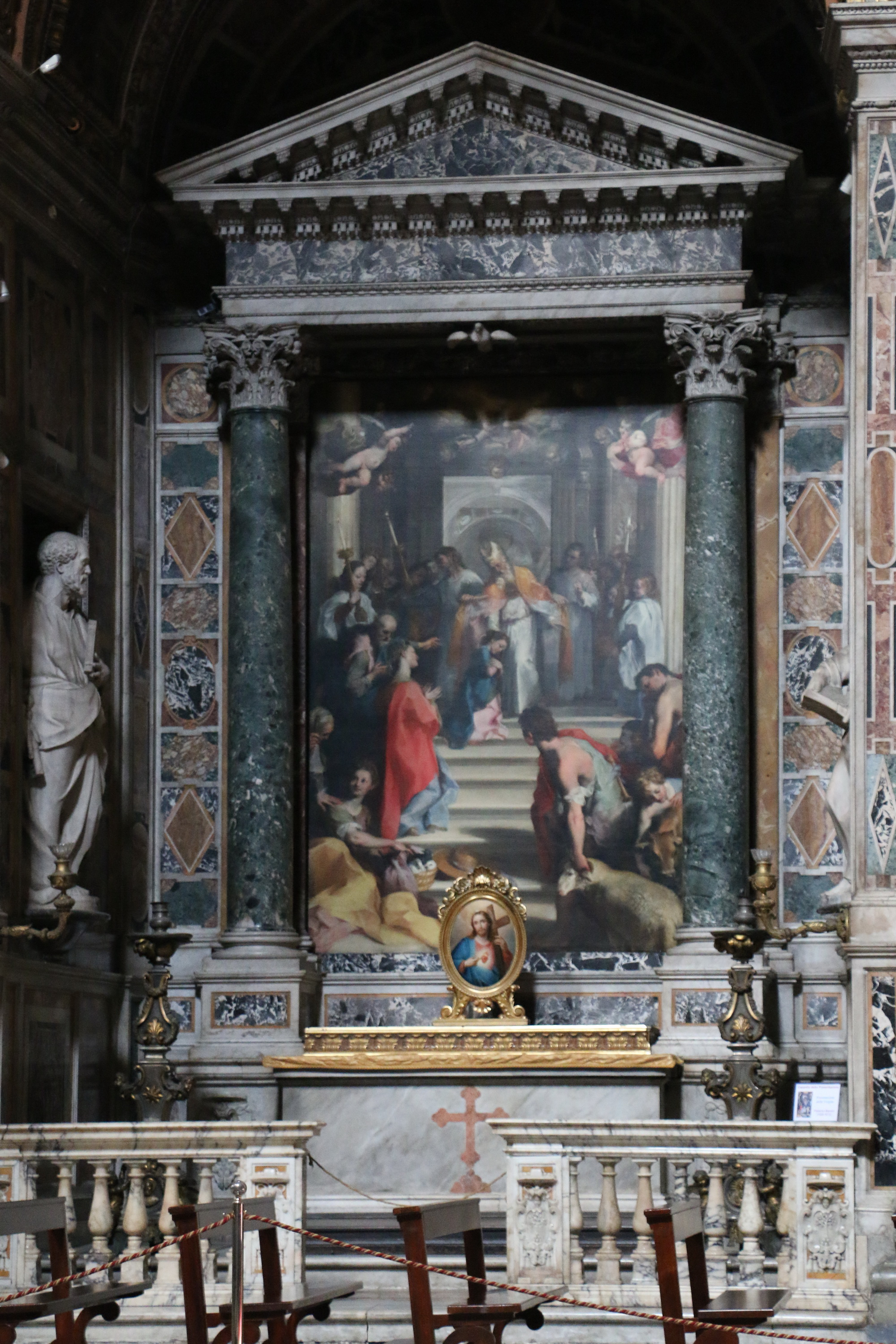
Presentation of the Virgin by Federico Barocci

The first altarpiece on the right is a Crucifixion by Pulzone with a ceiling fresco painted by Lanfranco. The third altarpiece is an Ascension by Girolamo Muziano, the fourth, a Pentecost by Giovanni Maria Morandi; the fifth, an Assumption by Cerrini. In the transept is a Coronation of Mary by the Cavaliere d'Arpino, who also painted the first altarpiece (Presentation in the Temple) on the right.

In the right presbytery, is the Spada family chapel completed in 1593 by Rainaldi. Inside, a Madonna and Child with Saints Carlo Borromeo and Ignatius of Loyola (1675) was painted by Maratta. In the central presbytery, the bronze ciborium was designed by Ciro Ferri in 1681. Madonna della Vallicella with side panels showing Saints Domitilla, Nereus and Achilleus and Saints Gregory the Great, Maurus and Papias (1606–08) is one of the few works painted by Peter Paul Rubens created specifically for a Roman commission. Commissioned for 300 scudi by Monsignor Jacopo Serra (a Genoese-born partner in the Pallavicini Bank and the brother of Maria Di Antonio Serra, whose portrait Rubens painted in 1606), when installed the altarpiece is said to have caused a 'stir' among observers in Rome, who were generally unaccustomed to the Flemish painterly style.

In the left transept is a Presentation of Mary to the Temple (1593–94) by Federico Barocci. He completed two altarpieces that were highly admired in his time, including one in the Chapel of the Visitation (1583–1586).

The sacristy was begun in 1621 based on architectural plans by Mario Arconio and completed by Paolo Maruscelli in 1629. In the sacristy is a marble sculptural group of S. Filippo with an Angel by Alessandro Algardi. The wall frescoes are by Francesco Trevisani and the Benediction by Christ by Cerrini with the ceiling frescoed with Angels carrying the instruments of the Passion (1633–34) by Pietro da Cortona.

The fifth altarpiece on the left is an Annunciation by the Passignano; the fourth, a Visitation by Barocci with the ceiling frescoed with Saints by Saraceni. In the third Adoration by the Shepherds by Durante Alberti and the vault frescoed with a Saint by Cristofano Roncalli. The second altarpiece is an Adoration by the Magi by Cesare Nebbia; the first, a Presentation to the Temple by d'Arpino.

In 1635 Alessandro Salucci worked on decorations in the Chapel of the Presentation of Our Lady. Salucci painted frescoes on the vault, depicting the story of Hannah, Elkanah and the young Samuel. Salucci's frescos were painted over the decorations made by Domenico de Coldie in 1590.

One painting that did not stay in its intended chapel is worth recording; Caravaggio's altarpiece of the Entombment of Christ was commissioned by Alessandro Vittrice, nephew of one of Saint Philip's friends, and depicted the entombment in a radically naturalistic format, foreign to the grand manner found in the remaining altarpieces. The original is in the Vatican Pinacoteca. A copy by a Flemish painter now takes its place.

Neri is buried in the chapel to the left of the choir, which is dedicated to him, in a tomb decorated with mother-of-pearl. Designed by Onorio Longhi in 1600, the first octagonal part of the chapel has a central vault painting of St. Philip by Roncalli, and an altarpiece of The Virgin Appearing to St Philip Neri by Guido Reni (now a mosaic copy). In the inner and more removed part of the chapel, Cortona added a lantern to let in more light and the dome was redecorated, perhaps by Ciro Ferri.

Adjacent to the church is the Oratorio dei Filippini designed by the Baroque architect Francesco Borromini who with his brick façade created a marked contrast to the conventional travertine façade of the church.

== Cardinal-Priests ==
Since the 1946 consistory of Pope Pius XII, the church has been used as a titular church.

- Benedetto Aloisi Masella (18 February 1946 – 21 June 1948)
- Francesco Borgongini Duca (12 January 1953 – 4 October 1954)
- Paolo Giobbe (15 December 1958 – 14 August 1972)
- James Knox (5 March 1973 – 26 June 1983)
- Edward Bede Clancy (28 June 1988 – 3 August 2014)
- Ricardo Blázquez Pérez (14 February 2015 – present)

== See also ==
- Oratorio dei Filippini
- 17th-century Western domes

== Bibliography ==
- Ian Ferguson Verstegen, Federico Barocci and the Oratorians: Corporate Patronage and Style in the Counter-Reformation (Kirksville, Mo. USA: Truman State University Press, 2015).
- Alba Costamagna, Anna Gramiccia, Daria De Angelis, La festa del colore: Rubens alla Chiesa Nuova (De Luca Editori d'Arte, 2005) [Collana di studi e ricerche della Soprintendenza speciale per il Polo museale romano, 2].
- Costanza Barbieri, Sofia Barchiesi, Daniele Ferrara, Santa Maria in Vallicella: Chiesa Nuova (Roma: Fratelli Palombi, 1995).
- Paolo Montorsi, Carlo Molteni, Mario Colli, La Chiesa Nuova: la facciata, il restauro : 1595-1995 celebrazione Filippine (Roma: Gestedil, 1994).
- Antonella Pampalone, La Cappella della famiglia Spada nella Chiesa Nuova: Testimonianze documentarie (Roma: Ministero per i Beni Culturali e Ambientali, Ufficio Centrale per i Beni Archivistici, 1993).
- Francis Haskell, Patrons and Painters: A Study in the Relations Between Italian Art and Society in the Age of the Baroque (New Haven: Yale University Press, 1980), pp. 68–76.
