= Portrait of Maria di Antonio Serra =

1606 painting by Peter Paul Rubens

Portrait of Marchesa Maria Serra Pallavicino
- Portrait of Maria di Antonio Serra
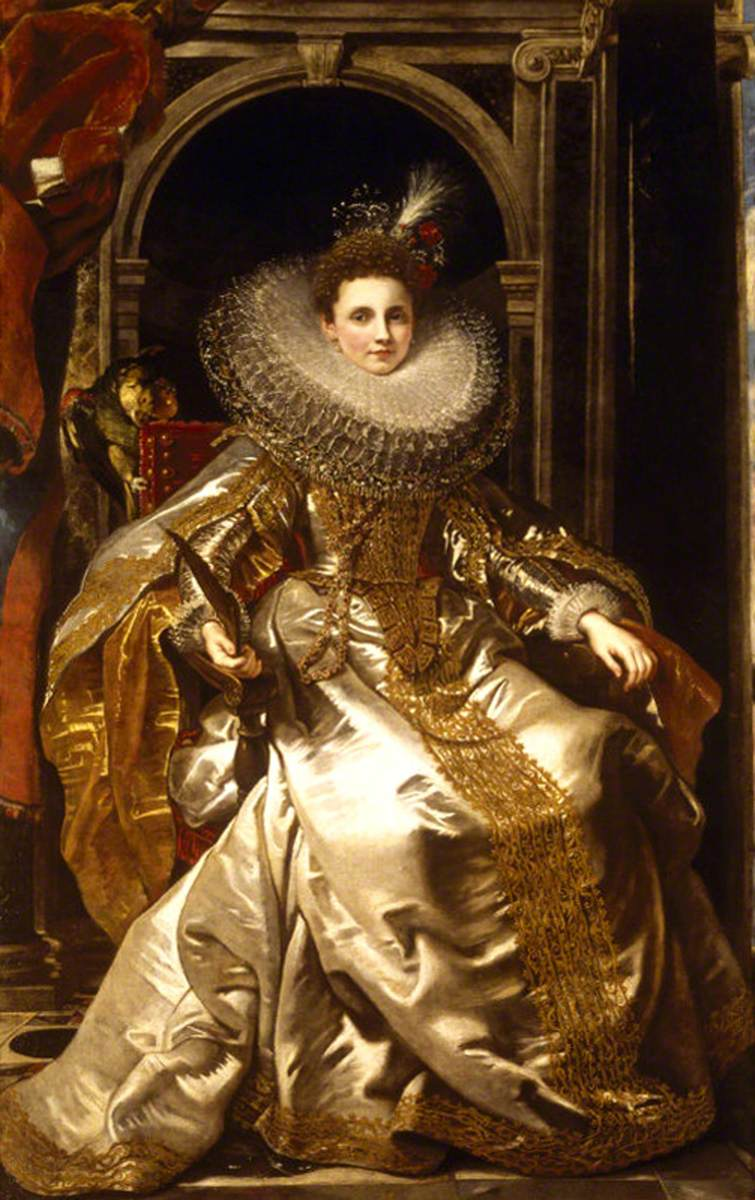
- Year: 1606
- Medium: oil paint, canvas
- Dimensions: 233.7 cm (92.0 in) × 144.8, 140 cm (57.0, 55.1 in)
- Location: Kingston Lacy
- Accession: 1257098

Portrait of Maria di Antonio Serra is a 1606 oil-on-canvas painting by Peter Paul Rubens, painted on the occasion of the sitter's marriage to Duke Nicolò Pallavicino in 1606 and now in the National Trust collection at Kingston Lacy.

== History ==
One of the earliest works produced by the artist in Genoa, it shows the wife of Pallavicino, a banker as well as host to Vincenzo I Gonzaga of Mantua, Rubens' then employer. Despite the heraldic details on the curtain at top left, the identity of its sitter had been lost by the time it first appears in the written record, namely Ratti's 1780 guide to the city. It and the same artist's Portrait of a Noblewoman, probably Marchesa Maria Grimaldi, and an Attendant (also at Kingston Lacey) were later acquired by the Grimaldi family, who misidentified the former as Marchesa Isabella Grimaldi. Both works were acquired in Genoa in 1840 by William John Bankes.
