= Papias and Maurus =

Papias and Maurus were a pair of Christian martyrs from an unknown era of persecution. Their cult as saints dates back to at least the 7th century and is recorded in pilgrim itineraries which record them as originally being buried in the Large Catacomb on via Nomentana. The Roman Martyrology records them on 29 January. Papias is sometimes misspelled Papianus.

According to the late (400-700 AD) and legendary martyrdom account Martyrdom of Marcellus and Companions, set during the Diocletianic Persecution, Papias and Maurus were soldiers impressed into conversion by the Christians Sisinnius and Saturninus, especially when the latter dissolved a metal tripod as if it was clay rather than obey the praefectus urbi Laodicius's order to sacrifice to the pagan gods on it. Sisinnius and Saturninus are then tortured and - on complaining of this - Laodoicius orders Papias and Maurus to be stoned and imprisoned. There they are baptised by Marcellus before being beaten and scourged to death in the Circus Flaminius. A priest called John collected their bodies and on 29 January buried them in a cemetery on the via Nomentana.

In 1590 their relics were rediscovered in Sant'Adriano al Foro Romano, then the titular church of cardinal Agostino Cusani. He gave the relics to Santa Maria in Vallicella, where they were placed under the building's high altar with some relics of saints Domitilla, Nereus and Achilleus. The pair were painted three times by Peter Paul Rubens, often with Gregory the Great, traditionally held to be the founder of Santa Maria in Vallicella:

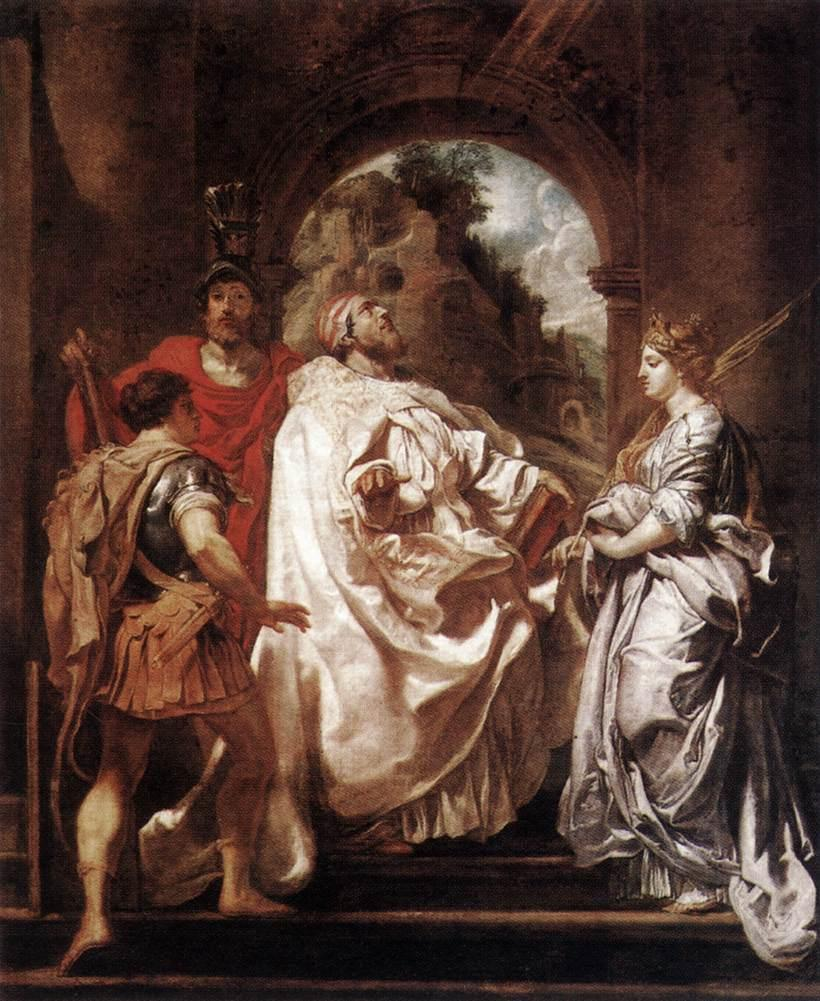
Saint Gregory the Great with Saints Domitilla, Papias and Maurus (1606, Gemäldegalerie, Berlin)

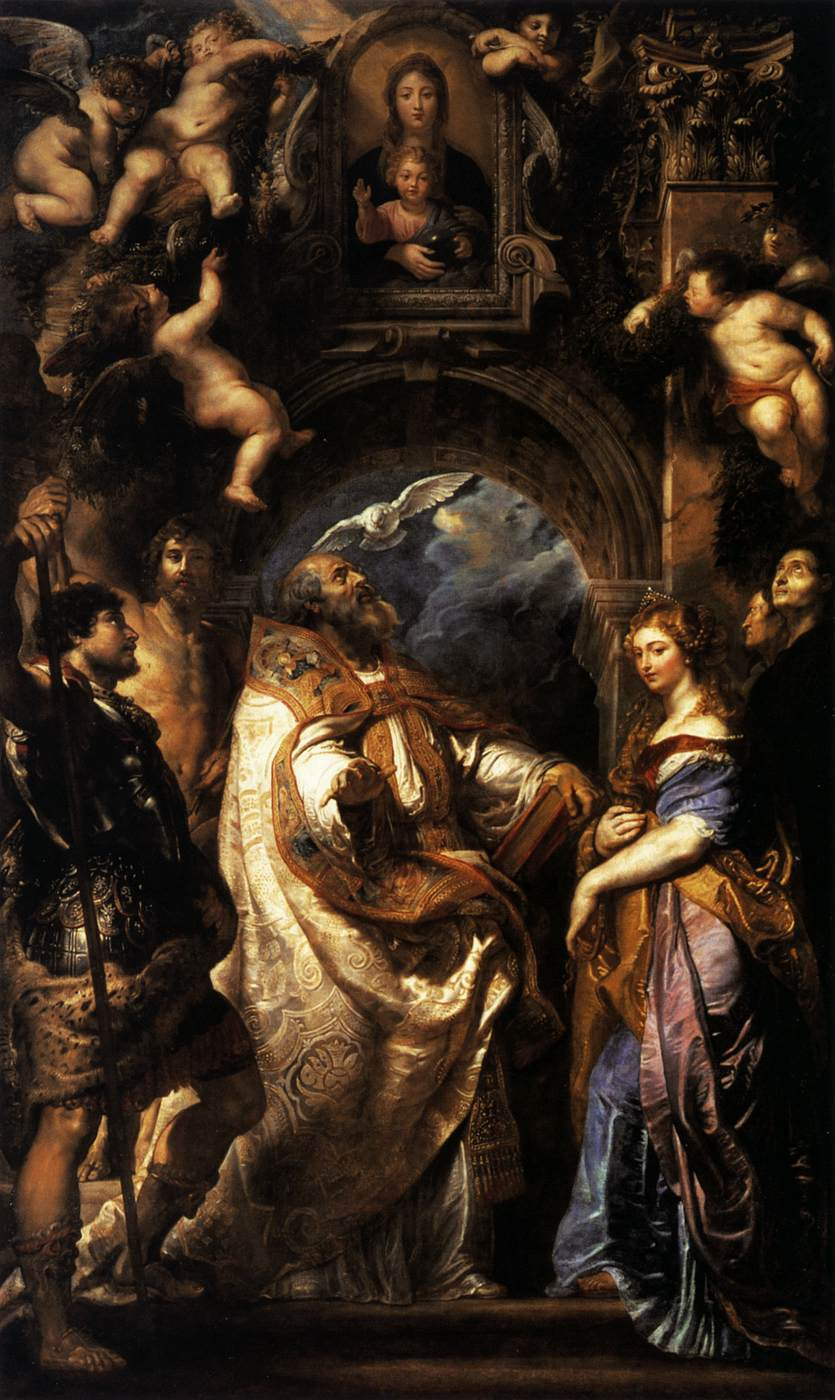
Saint Gregory the Great with Saints (1606-1607, Musée de Grenoble)

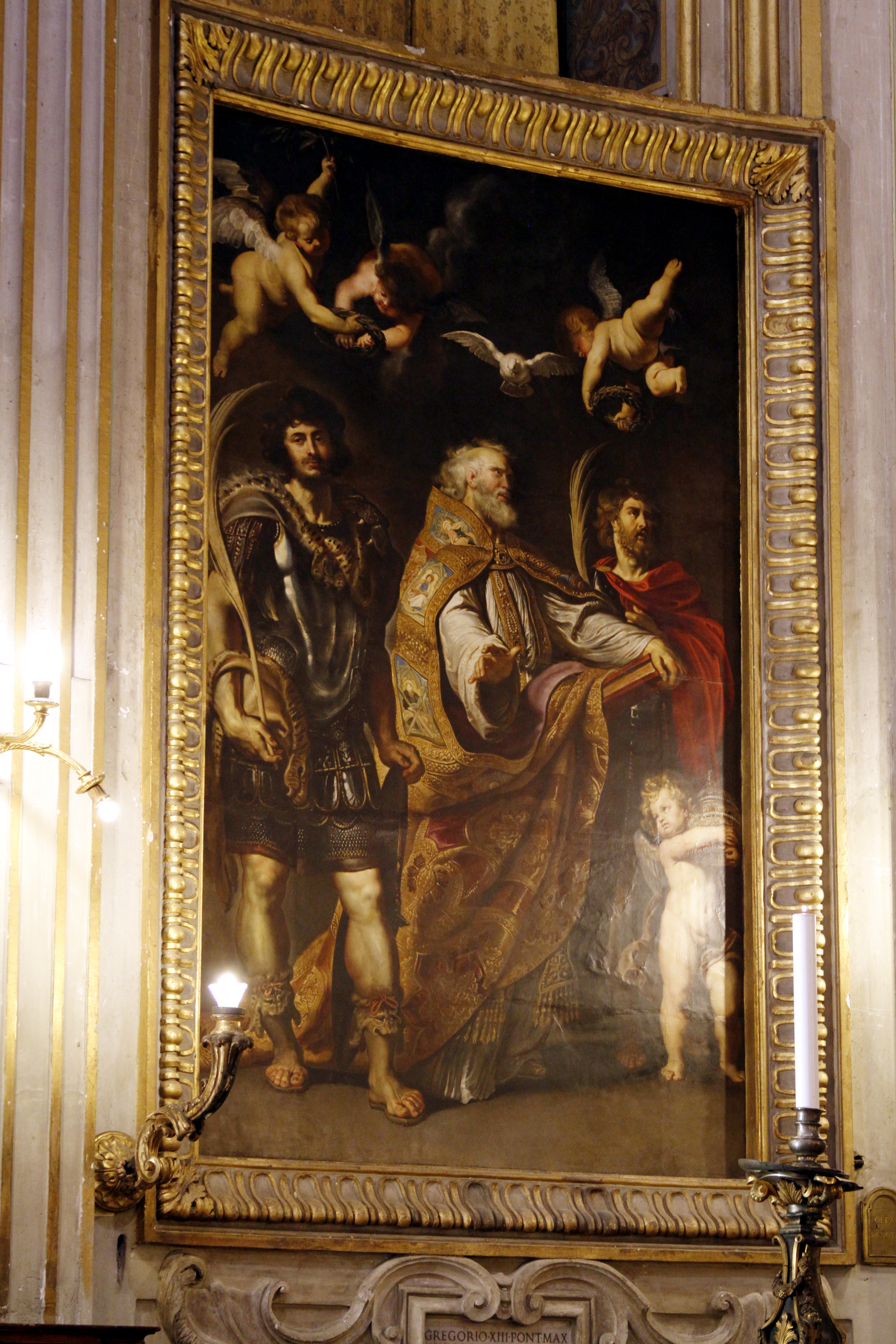
Saints Papias and Maurus with Saint Gregory (1608, Santa Maria in Vallicella, Rome)
