= Portrait of a Noblewoman with an Attendant =

Painting by Peter Paul Rubens

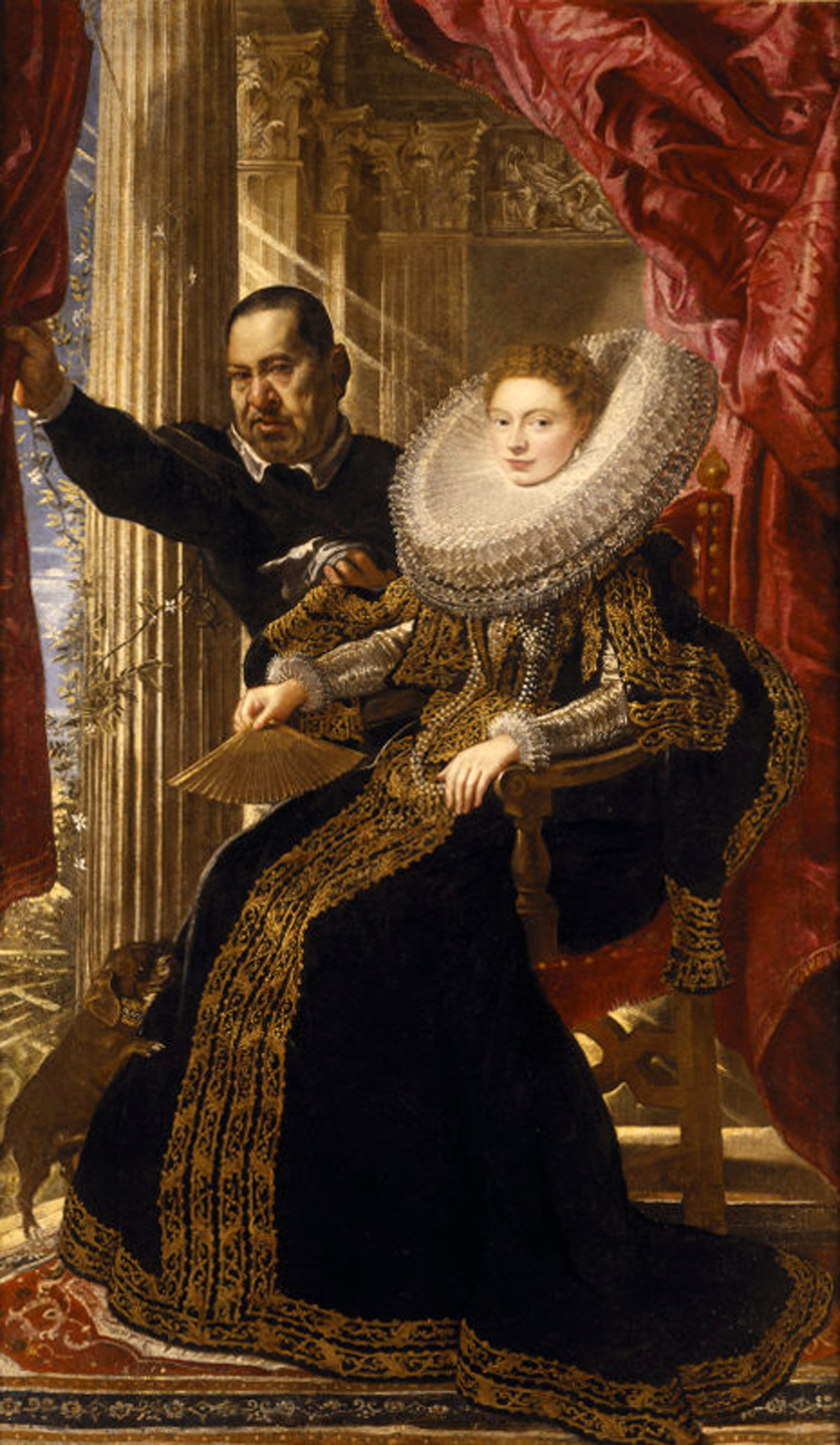
Portrait of a Noblewoman with a Dwarf (c. 1606) by Peter Paul Rubens

Portrait of a Noblewoman with an Attendant is an oil-on-canvas portrait by Peter Paul Rubens executed c. 1606. It probably shows Maria Grimaldi, daughter of Carlo Grimaldi, a marquess who in 1607 loaned his villa at Sampadierna to Rubens and his patron Vincenzo Gonzaga, Duke of Mantua. The attendant is probably a man with dwarfism, then a popular custom at European courts. The painting is now owned by the National Trust, being acquired in 1982 as part of their Kingston Lacy property.
