= Nereus and Achilleus =

Roman Christian martyrs

Saints Nereus and Achilleus
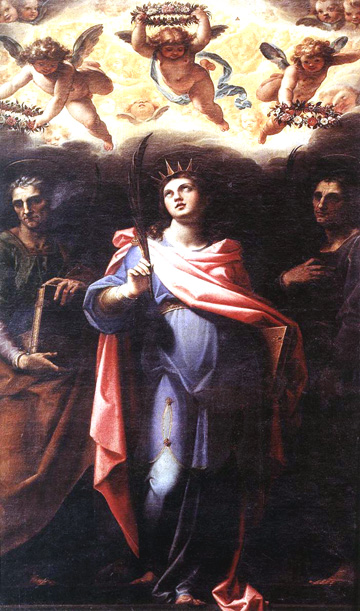
- Saint Domitilla with Saint Nereus and Achilleus, by Niccolò Circignani

Martyrs
- Died: Rome (Nereus and Achilleus); Terracina (Nereus, Achilleus and Domitilla, according to legend); Rome (Pancras)
- Venerated in: Roman Catholic Church
- Major shrine: Santi Nereo e Achilleo; San Pancrazio
- Feast: 12 May

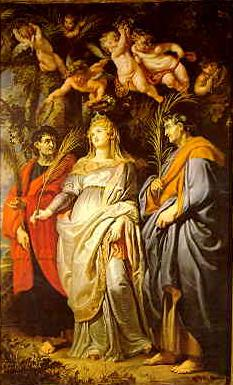
Saints Domitilla, Nereus, Achilleus, by Peter Paul Rubens.

Nereus and Achilleus are two Roman martyr saints. In the present General Roman Calendar, revised in 1969, Nereus and Achilleus (together) are celebrated (optional memorial) on 12 May.

The Tridentine calendar had on 12 May a joint feast (semidouble rank) of Nereus, Achilleus and Pancras. The name of Domitilla was added in 1595. The joint celebration of Nereus, Achilleus, Domitilla and Pancras continued with that ranking (see General Roman Calendar of 1954) until the revision of 1960, when it was reclassified as a third-class feast (see General Roman Calendar of 1960).

== Nereus and Achilleus ==
The old Roman lists of the 5th century, which passed over into the Martyrologium Hieronymianum, contain the names of the two martyrs Nereus and Achilleus, whose grave was in the Catacomb of Domitilla on the Via Ardeatina. The notice in the more complete version given by the Berne Codex reads: "IIII id. Maii, Romae in coemeterio Praetextati natale Nerei et Achillei fratrum (On 12 May at Rome in the cemetery of Praetextatus [an evident error for Domitilla?] the natal day of the brothers Nereus and Achilleus").

In the invocation of the Mass for 2 October in the "Sacramentarium Gelasianum", the names of Nereus and Achilleus alone are mentioned. In the fourth and following centuries a special votive Mass was celebrated on 12 May at the grave of Nereus and Achilleus on the Via Ardeatina. The Itineraries of the graves of the Roman martyrs, written in the 7th century, are unanimous in their indication of the resting-place of these saints (Giovanni Battista de Rossi, "Roma sotterranea", I, 180–83).

The basilica of Sts. Nereus and Achilleus in the Via Ardeatina (not to be confused with the church of the same name near the Baths of Caracalla to which the relics of the saints were translated in the 6th century), was erected above the burial site of Nereus and Achilleus and is of the latter part of the 4th century; it is a three-naved basilica, which was abandoned in the mid 9th century and rediscovered in 1874 by de Rossi in the Catacomb of Domitilla. Amongst the numerous objects found in the ruins were two pillars which had supported the ciborium ornamented with sculptures representing the death of the two saints by decapitation; one of these pillars is perfectly preserved, and the name of Achilleus is carved on it. There was also found a large fragment of a marble slab, with an inscription composed by Pope Damasus, the text of which is well known and also preserved in Medieval manuscripts. This oldest historical mention of Nereus and Achilleus tells how the two as soldiers were obedient to the tyrant, but suddenly being converted to Christianity, joyfully resigned their commission and died the martyr's death. The acts of these martyrs, legendary even to a romantic degree, have no historical value for their life and death; they bring no fewer than thirteen different Roman martyrs into relation, amongst them even Simon Magus, according to the apocryphal Petrine Acts, and place their death in the end of the first and beginning of the 2nd centuries. These Acts were written in Greek and Latin; according to Achelis (see below) the Greek was the original text, and written in Latin in the 6th century.

== Legend ==
According to these legends, Nereus and Achilleus were eunuchs and chamberlains of Flavia Domitilla, a niece of the Roman Emperor Domitian; with the Christian virgin, they had been banished to the island of Ponza (Pontia), and later on beheaded in Terracina. The graves of these two martyrs were on an estate of the Lady Domitilla near the Via Ardeatina, close to that of Petronilla.

The author of this legend places the two saints quite differently from the poem of Pope Damasus. Nereus and Achilleus were buried in a very ancient part of the Catacomb of Domitilla, built as far back as the beginning of the 2nd century; based on this, the Catholic Encyclopedia concludes that they are among the most ancient martyrs of the Roman Church, and stand in very near relation to the Flavian family, of which Domitilla, the foundress of the catacomb, was a member. As to other martyrs of the name Nereus, who are especially noted in the old martyrologies as martyrs of the faith in Africa, or as being natives of that country (e.g., in the Martyrologium Hieronymianum, 11 May, 15 or 16 October, 16 November) though there is one of the name in the present Roman Martyrology under date of 16 October, nothing more is known.

The relics of Nereus and Achilleus are housed since the 6th century together with the relics of Domitilla under the high altar of the church of Ss. Nereo e Achilleo.

== Feast day ==
The Tridentine calendar had on 12 May a joint feast (semidouble rank) of Nereus, Achilleus and Pancras. The name of Domitilla was added in 1595. The joint celebration of Nereus, Achilleus, Domitilla and Pancras continued with that ranking in the General Roman Calendar of 1954, was reduced to that of simple in the General Roman Calendar of Pope Pius XII and that of third-class feast in the General Roman Calendar of 1960.

In the present General Roman Calendar, revised in 1969, Saints Nereus and Achilleus (together) and Saint Pancras have distinct celebrations (optional memorials) on 12 May. Saint Domitilla is not included in the revised calendar, because the liturgical honours once paid to her "have no basis in tradition".

== See also ==
- Pancras of Rome
- Tridentine calendar
