= Alcalá de Henares =

- Municipality
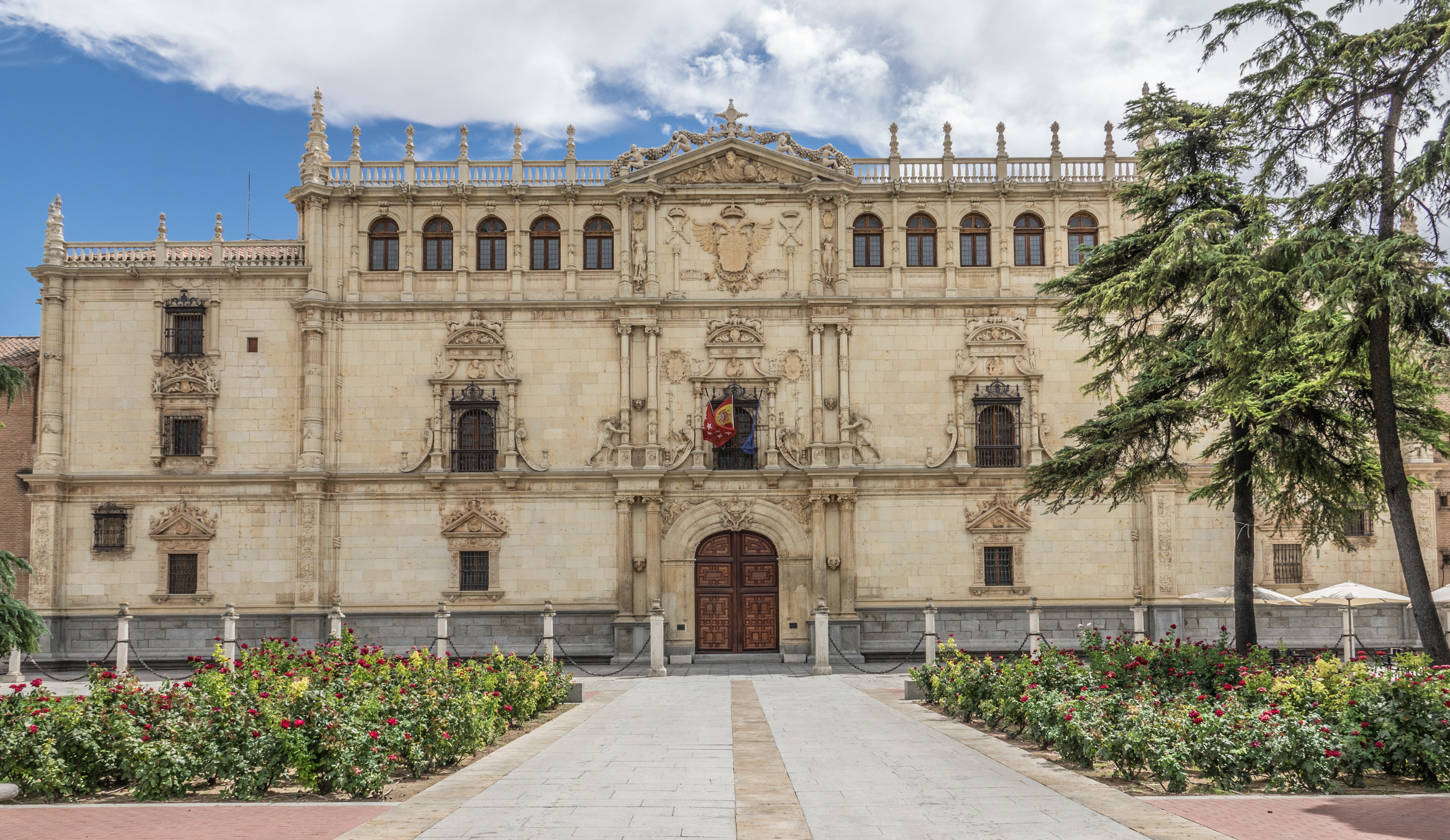
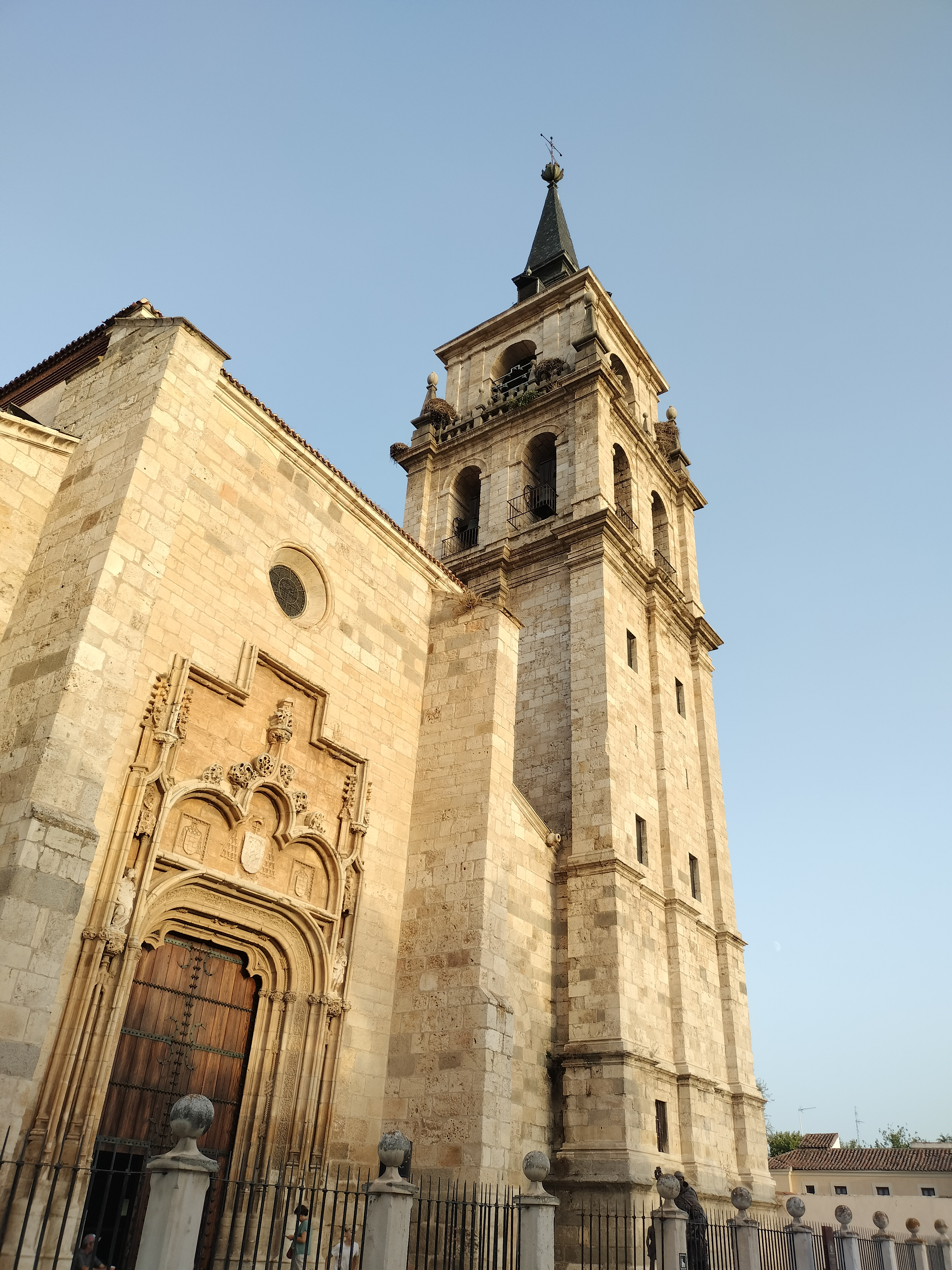
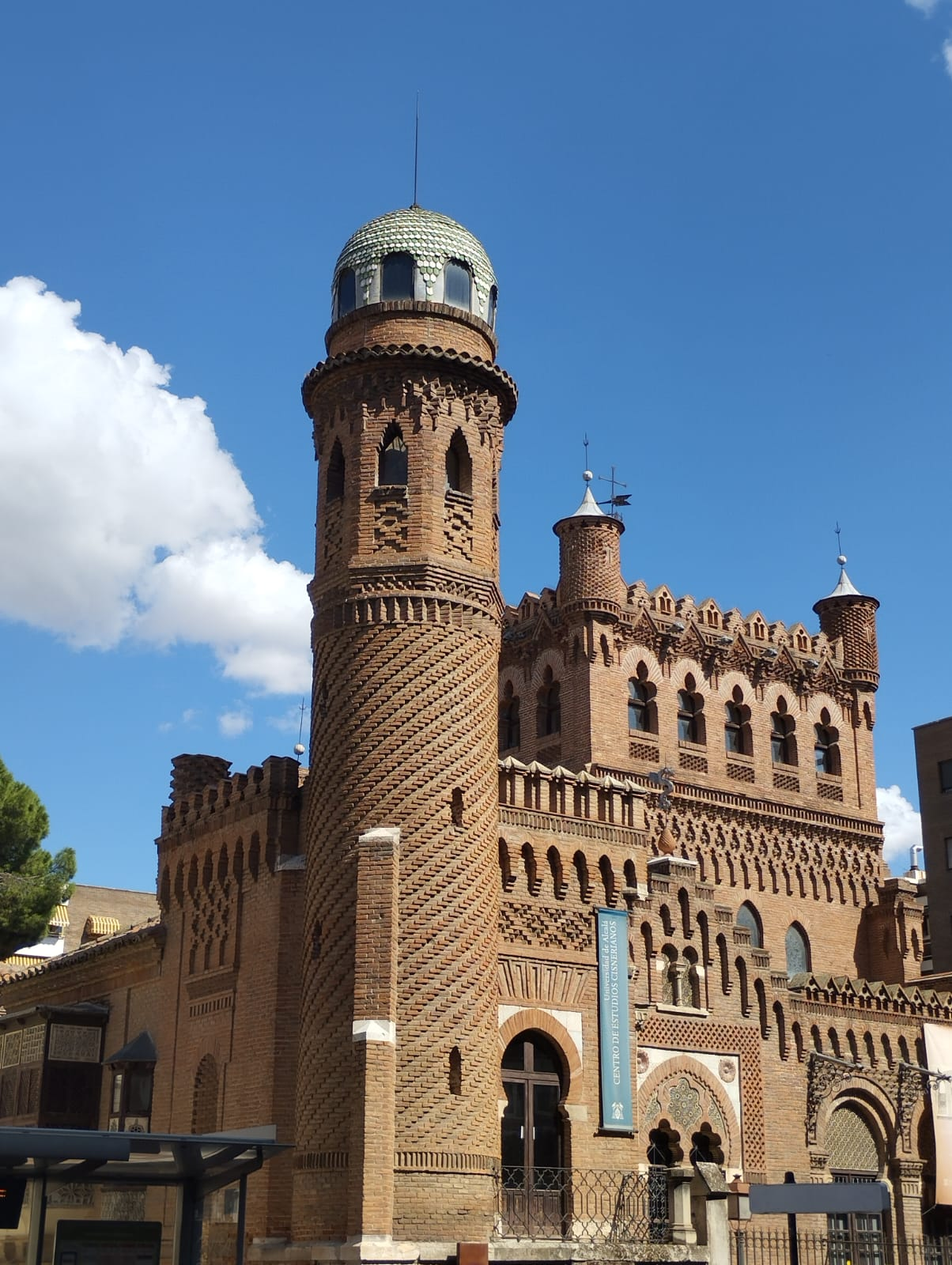
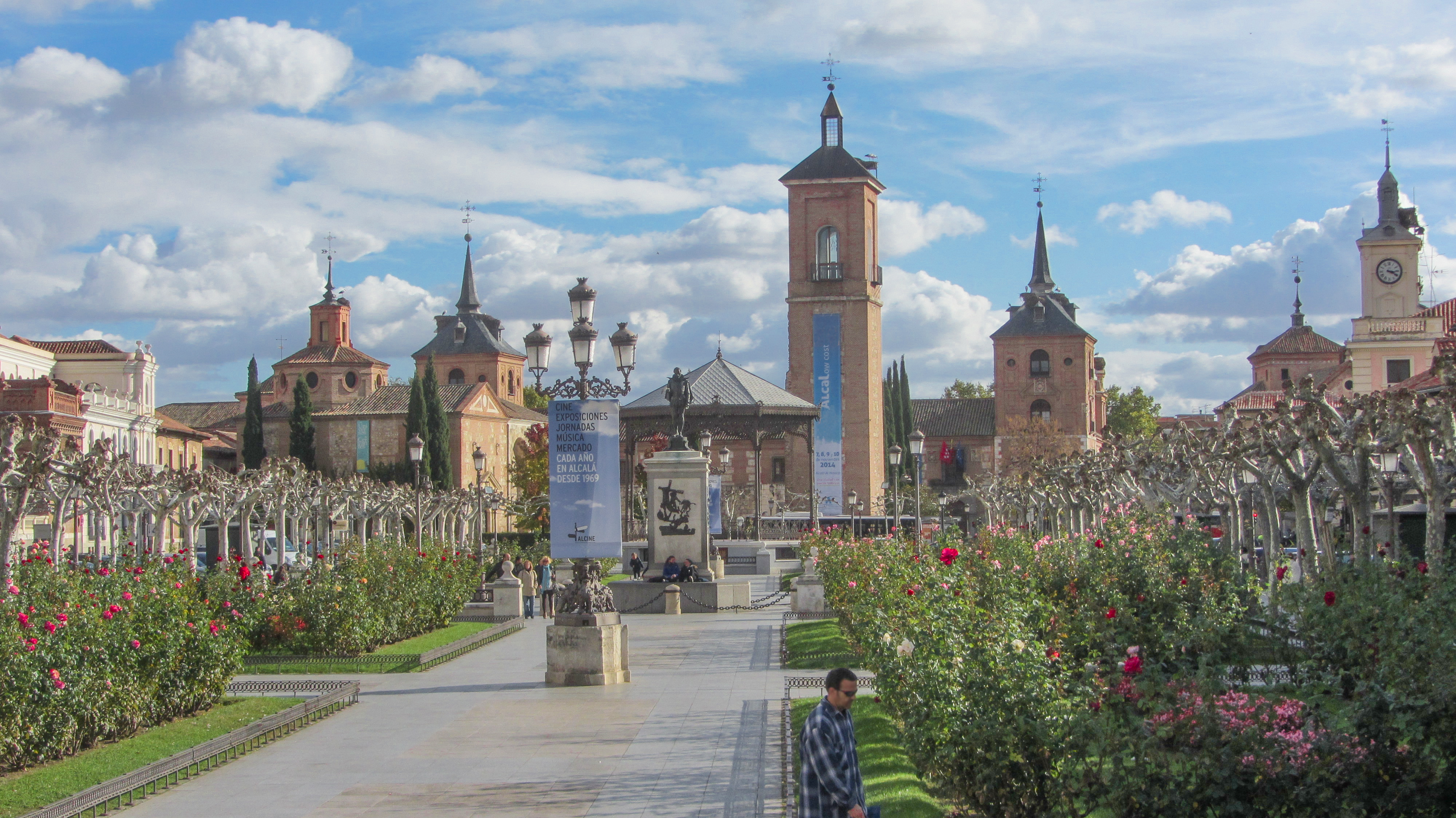
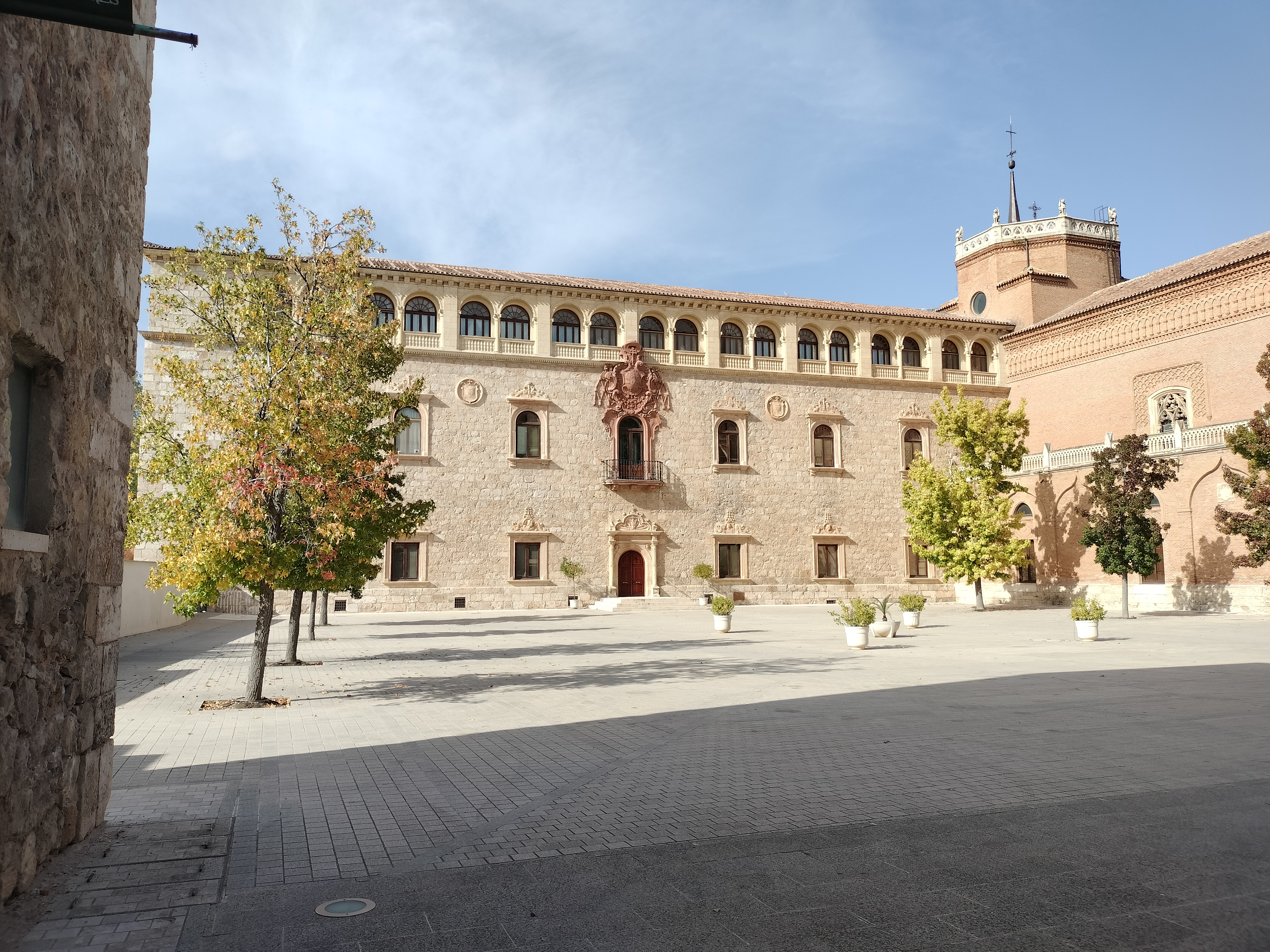
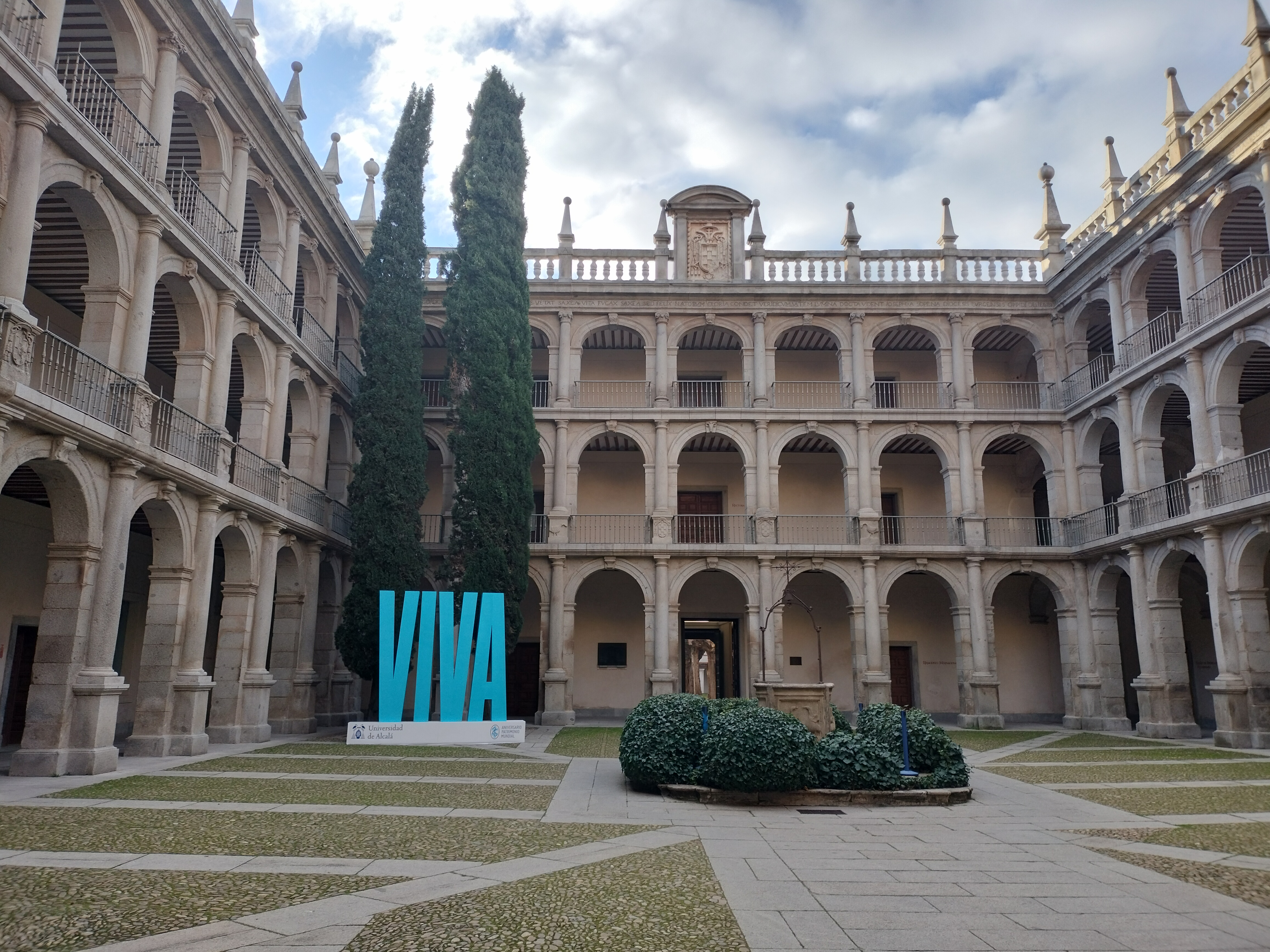
- University of Alcalá Magistral Cathedral Palace of Laredo Plaza de Cervantes Archiepiscopal Palace Courtyard of Saint Thomas of Villanueva

- Flag Coat of arms
- Interactive map of Alcalá de Henares
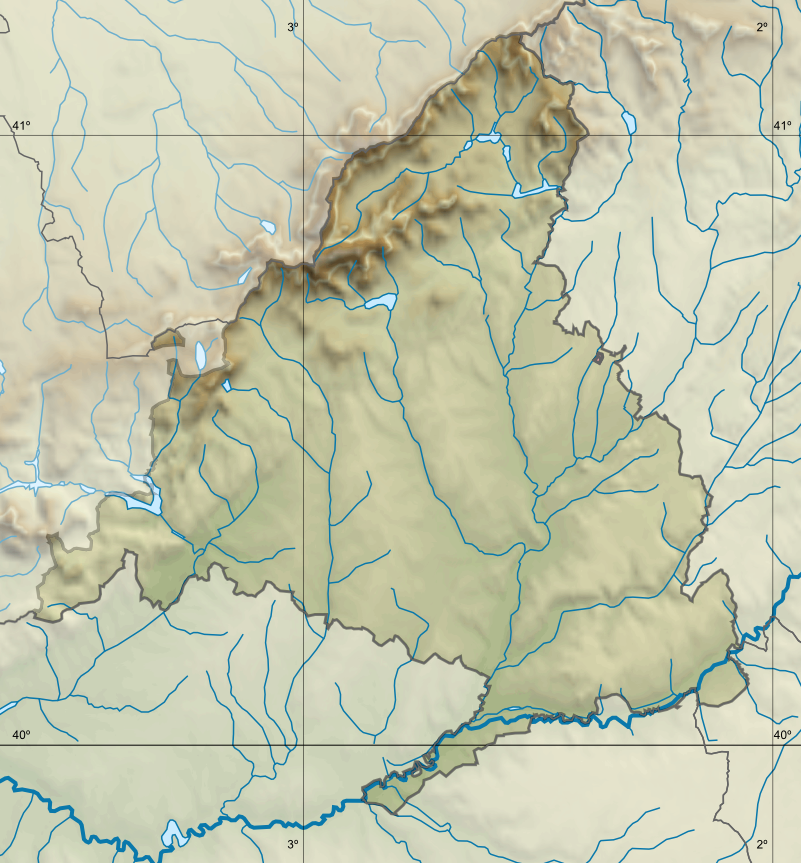
- Location within Community of Madrid Location within Spain
- Coordinates: 40°28′N 3°22′W
- Country: Spain
- Autonomous community: Community of Madrid

Government
  - Type: Ayuntamiento
  - Body: Ayuntamiento de Alcalá de Henares
  - Mayor: Judith Piquet (PP)

Area
  - Total: 87.72 km^{2} (33.87 sq mi)
- Elevation: 594 m (1,949 ft)

Population (2025-01-01)
  - Total: 203,208
  - Density: 2,317/km^{2} (6,000/sq mi)
- Demonyms: Alcalaíno -a, complutense
- Time zone: UTC+1 (CET)
  - Summer (DST): UTC+2 (CEST)
- Postal code: 28801-28807
- Dialing code: (+34) 91
- Website: Official website

UNESCO World Heritage Site
- Official name: University and Historic Precinct of Alcalá de Henares
- Criteria: Cultural: ii, iv, vi
- Reference: 876
- Inscription: 1998 (22nd Session)

Alcalá de Henares (Spanish pronunciation: [alkaˈla ðe eˈnaɾes]) is a Spanish municipality of the Community of Madrid. Housing is primarily located on the north bank of the Henares. As of 2025, it has a population of 203,208, making it the region's third-most populated municipality.

Predated by earlier hilltop settlements (oppida) and the primitive Complutum on the left bank of the Henares, the new Roman settlement of Complutum was founded in the mid 1st century on the right bank (north) river meadow, becoming a bishopric seat in the 5th century. One of the several Muslim citadels in the Middle March of al-Andalus (hence the name Alcalá, a derivative of the Arabic term for citadel) was established on the left bank, while, after the Christian conquest culminated c. 1118, the bulk of the urban nucleus returned to the right bank. For much of the late middle-ages and the early modern period before becoming part of the province of Madrid, Alcalá de Henares was a seigneurial estate of the archbishops of Toledo. Under patronage of Francisco Jiménez de Cisneros, Alcalá was transformed into a college town in the 16th century in the wake of the creation of the University of Alcalá.

Its historical centre is one of UNESCO's World Heritage Sites.

== Name ==
The name Alcalá comes from the Arabic word القلعة al-qalʿa, in connection to the fortress of Alcalá la Vieja (Qal'at Abd'Al-Salam). The appendix of Henares (archaically Fenares) referring to the river, thought to be derived either from the Latin foenarius or the Arabic en-Nahr, is recorded for the first time in 1257, as a way to differentiate the town from the Islamic fortress.

Its Latin name, Complutum, means "confluence", where rivers' water (or rain water) flow into one place (i.e., a compluvium).

== History ==
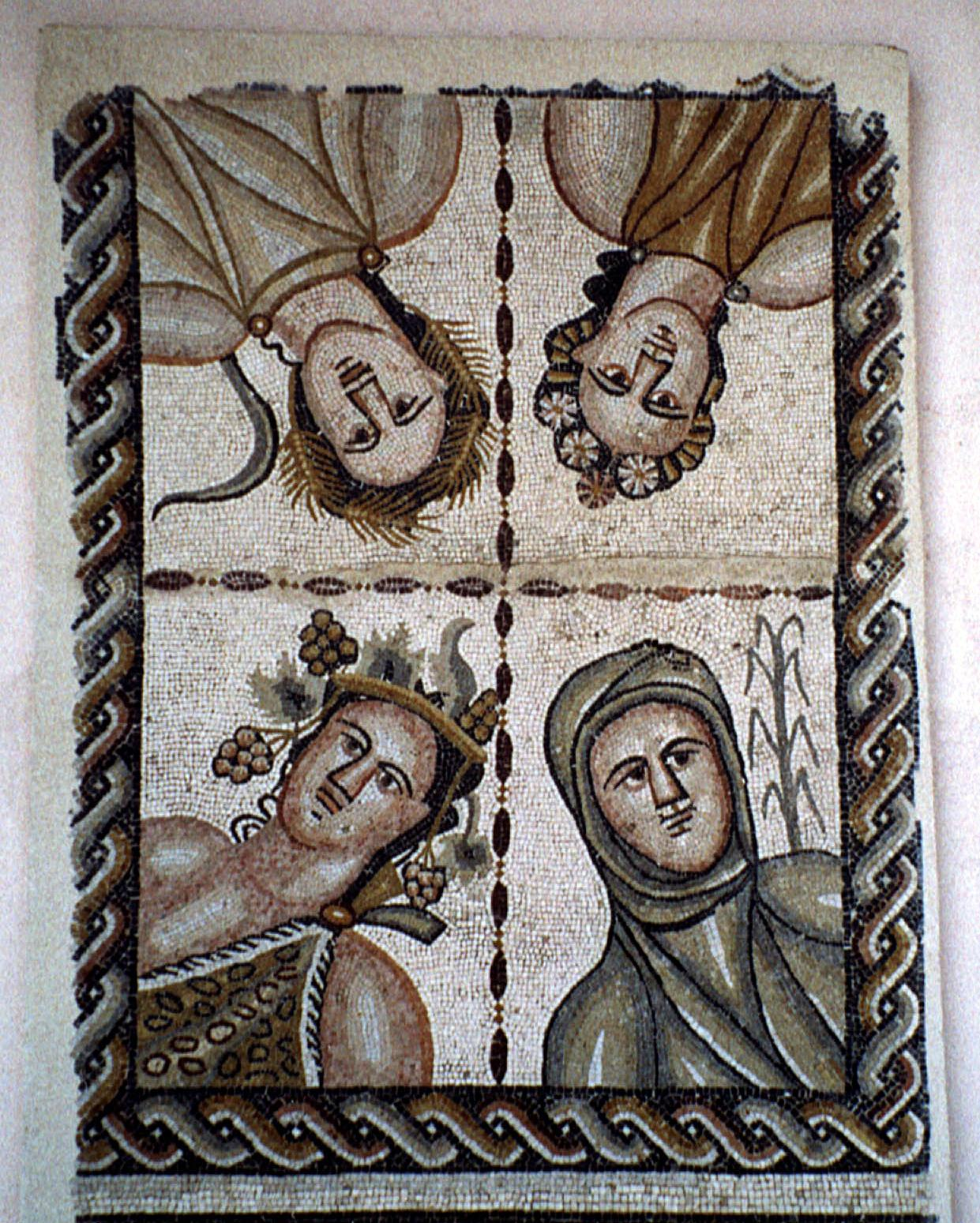
Roman mosaic of the four seasons, the House of Bacchus, Complutum

Inhabited since the Chalcolithic phase of the Bronze Age, the territory was conquered by Romans in the 1st century BC. They built the town of Complutum near a previous Carpetanian settlement, Iplacea. With 10,000 inhabitants, it reached the status of municipium and had its own governing institutions. It played an important role, located on the Roman road connecting Emerita Augusta and Caesaraugusta. In the late 5th century, Complutum declined.

In Late Antiquity, population underwent ruralization and dispersion into scattered settlements beyond the ruined Roman center; those included the so-called Campus Laudabilis (the germ of the current urban centre and where tradition claims the martyrdom of the boys Justus and Pastor took place)— and around the villa of El Val).

After the Islamic conquest of the Iberian peninsula, the territory became part of the eastern districts of the Middle March of Al-Andalus, primarily controlled by Berber lineages of the Banū Sālim, who seemed to be, at least outwardly, loyal to Umayyad central authority. The hills on the Henares' left bank were repopulated, with archaeological evidence pointing at least to the 9th century. The settlement grew, from watchtower to Ḥiṣn, and then a larger citadel, Qal'at Abd'Al-Salam, hence the name of Alcalá. The plains (presumably with sizeable Mozarab population) were however not fully abandoned during the middle ages. As it emerged the pressing need to defend the Tagus line from Christian advances in the 10th century, the fortification and the surrounding urban developments (with up to two neighborhoods beyond the walls) grew in size.

On 3 May 1118, the territory was conquered by the Archbishop of Toledo Bernard de Sedirac at behest of the Kingdom of Castile. Soon after, on 10 February 1129, Alfonso VII gave Alcalá to Raymond de Sauvetât, also Archbishop of Toledo, becoming an archiepiscopal property for centuries to come. Raymond granted the town an old fuero (charter) in 1135. The document acknowledged a doublet of settlements, mentioning the castle and the town. Throughout the middle ages, presumably also including 11th-century Islamic Alcalá, the place also had a Jewish population, protected by the Archishops of Toledo under Christian rule, whose aljama should have had a size of about 750 by 1292. (Note: As inferred from the Padrón de Huete census data. The local Jews were mentioned in the 14th-century Satire by Pero Ferrús.) As warfare was left behind, the population in the more fertile and better communicated plains grew in importance relative to the castle, although the right bank settlement and the whole did not preserve the Christian name of Burgo de San Justo (or that of Complutum for that matter), but took the name of Alcalá.

Its central position allowed it to be a frequent residence of the Kings of Castile, when travelling south. The town's mudéjar population worked in agriculture, woodwork, pottery, and craftwork. From the late 14th century, they were banned from living among Christians, so from then on they resided in a ghetto. Likewise, the members of the local Jewish minority were primarily employed as craftspeople, merchants, lenders, tax collectors, and in liberal professions. During the 15th century, the latter was one of the largest Jewish communities in Castile, accounting for about 200 families.

Cardinal Cisneros officially opened the University of Alcalá on 14 March 1500, leading to a new stage of urban development that transformed the preexisting urban fabric, and so Alcalá became a true college town with the creation of regular streets, and plenty of colleges. Cisneros also granted the town a new fuero in 1509. The polyglot Bible known as the Complutensian Polyglot Bible, the first of the many similar Bibles produced during the revival of Biblical studies that took place in the 16th century, was printed at Alcalá under the care of Cisneros, who also encouraged Hebrew studies at the University of Alcalá, (Note: He brought hebraists such as crypto-Jew Alfonso de Zamora to work in the city.) and brought moriscos from Granada for the university's building works.

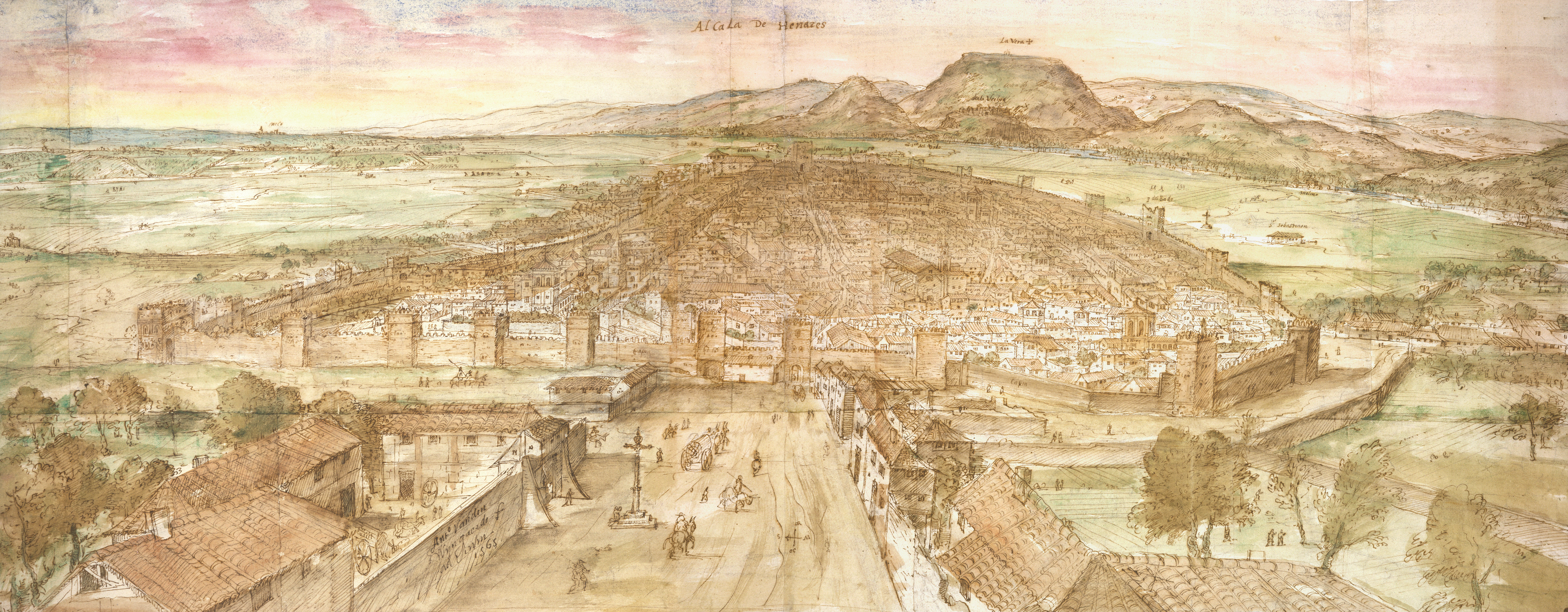
View of the town by Anton van den Wyngaerde (1565)

By the mid 16th century the service-based economy (dedicated to catering to clerics and students) already gave signs of decline. The last years of the century were particularly dire for Alcalá, and a 1599 plague epidemics decimated the population. With bad harvests and food scarcity, the 17th century started by following a similar demographic trend, to which the expulsion of the Moriscos in 1610 also added on. Despite being largely ruined, the town acquired the status of city in 1687 after long negotiations.

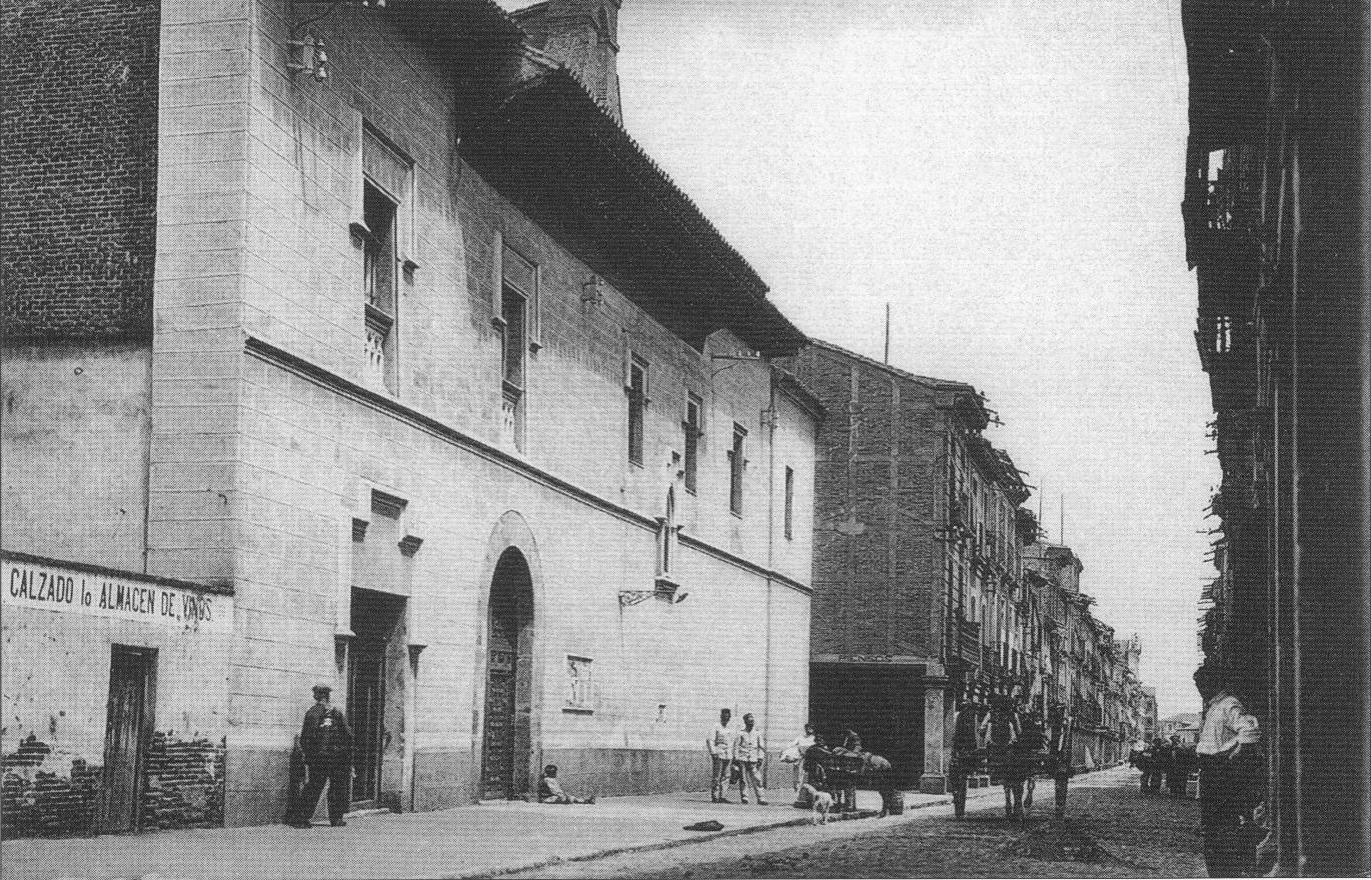
Calle Mayor, c. 1910

In decadence since the mid-18th century, Alcalá de Henares experienced a relative demographic and economic upturn in the second half of the 19th century, based on its newly acquired condition of military outpost, to which an embryonic industrial nucleus was also added.

The population steadily increased from 1868 to 1939. The population was still agrarian to a large extent, with high levels of illiteracy and poverty. Seeking social change, Republican and later Socialist movements grew in force in the city. The leading figure in the latter movement was Antonio Fernández Quer, who became the first municipal councillor from the Spanish Socialist Workers' Party in the province of Madrid in 1903. Emerging in reaction to Socialist advances, Social catholicism also took hold in the city from 1905, founding a number of organizations such as Centro Católico de Acción Social Popular and the Mutual Obrera Complutense.

Following the 1936 coup d'etat that sparked the Spanish Civil War, putschist elements seized key posts around the city. However, following the botched coup in Madrid, Rebel forces in Alcalá eventually surrendered to Republican Colonel Ildefonso Puigdendolas and his troops on 21 July. Alcalá reportedly became a Soviet power base during the conflict—a "republic within the republic" where the Republican national government held a tenuous grip. (Note: Alcalá was the place where POUM leader Andrés Nin was transferred to and tortured and killed in June 1937 by NKVD agents.)

The city suffered severe damage during the Spanish Civil War.

Thousands of prisoners were held in different camps in the city after the end of the war. From March 1939 to February 1948, at least 264 individuals were executed in Alcalá by the Francoist authorities.

== Geography ==
=== Location ===
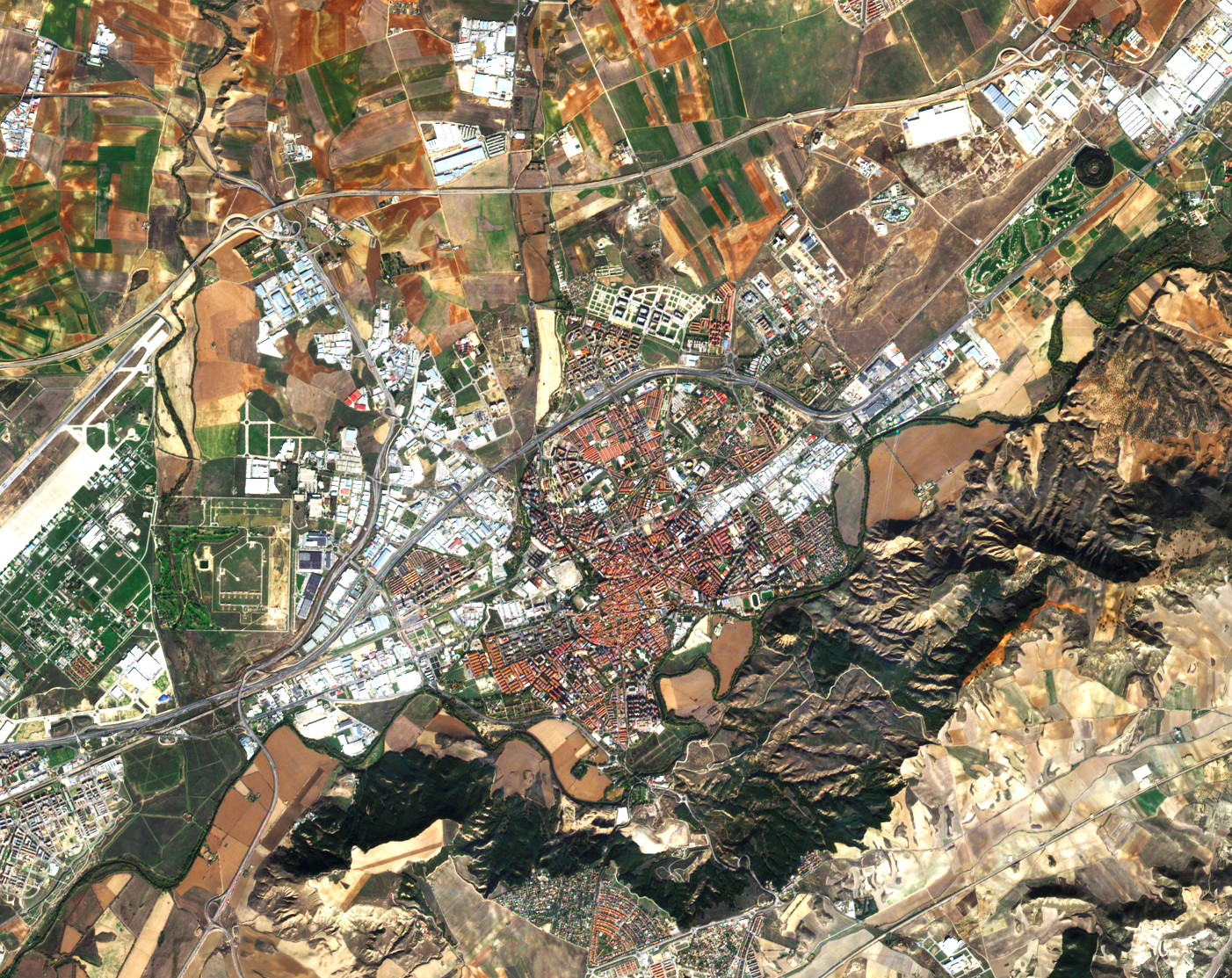
Alcalá de Henares as seen by the Sentinel-2 of the European Space Agency

Alcalá de Henares is located in the central part of the Iberian Peninsula, in the southern half of the Inner Plateau. It lies on the valley of the Henares, a left-bank tributary of the Jarama, which is in turn a right-bank tributary of the Tagus. The right (north) bank of the river (on which the current urban nucleus was built) displays a very flat relief with a series of quaternary fluvial terraces, while the left (southern) bank features a very steep slope of clays from the miocene, rapidly rising up to the moors of La Alcarria.

Standing at an average altitude of 654 m, and occupying some 88 km^{2}; the city was for a long time contained in between the Henares to the South and the Madrid-Barcelona railway to the North. However, the increasing population brought on the sprawl of the urbanised area to the area located in between the railway and the A-2 motorway and beyond.

=== Climate ===
The climate is semi-arid, with cold, dry winters and hot, dry summers. The average year-round temperature is 14 °C (57 °F). The average year-round rainfall is about 300 mm (11.8 in), mainly in spring and autumn. Temperatures vary from some degrees below 0 °C (32 °F) in December and January to some over 40 °C (104 °F) in July and August. Dry season coincides with maximum heat in summer.

Climate data for Alcalá de Henares, 1981–2010
Month	Jan	Feb	Mar	Apr	May	Jun	Jul	Aug	Sep	Oct	Nov	Dec	Year
Mean daily maximum °C (°F)	11.0 (51.8)	13.3 (55.9)	17.5 (63.5)	19.1 (66.4)	23.5 (74.3)	29.9 (85.8)	33.8 (92.8)	33.1 (91.6)	28.2 (82.8)	21.2 (70.2)	15.0 (59.0)	11.3 (52.3)	21.4 (70.5)
Mean daily minimum °C (°F)	0.1 (32.2)	0.9 (33.6)	3.0 (37.4)	5.0 (41.0)	8.5 (47.3)	12.8 (55.0)	15.2 (59.4)	14.8 (58.6)	11.7 (53.1)	7.8 (46.0)	3.5 (38.3)	1.2 (34.2)	7.0 (44.7)
Average rainfall mm (inches)	24.8 (0.98)	25.1 (0.99)	17.7 (0.70)	35.6 (1.40)	38.2 (1.50)	19.6 (0.77)	9.6 (0.38)	8.4 (0.33)	19.8 (0.78)	38.0 (1.50)	35.6 (1.40)	34.2 (1.35)	306.6 (12.08)
Source: World Meteorological Organization

== University ==
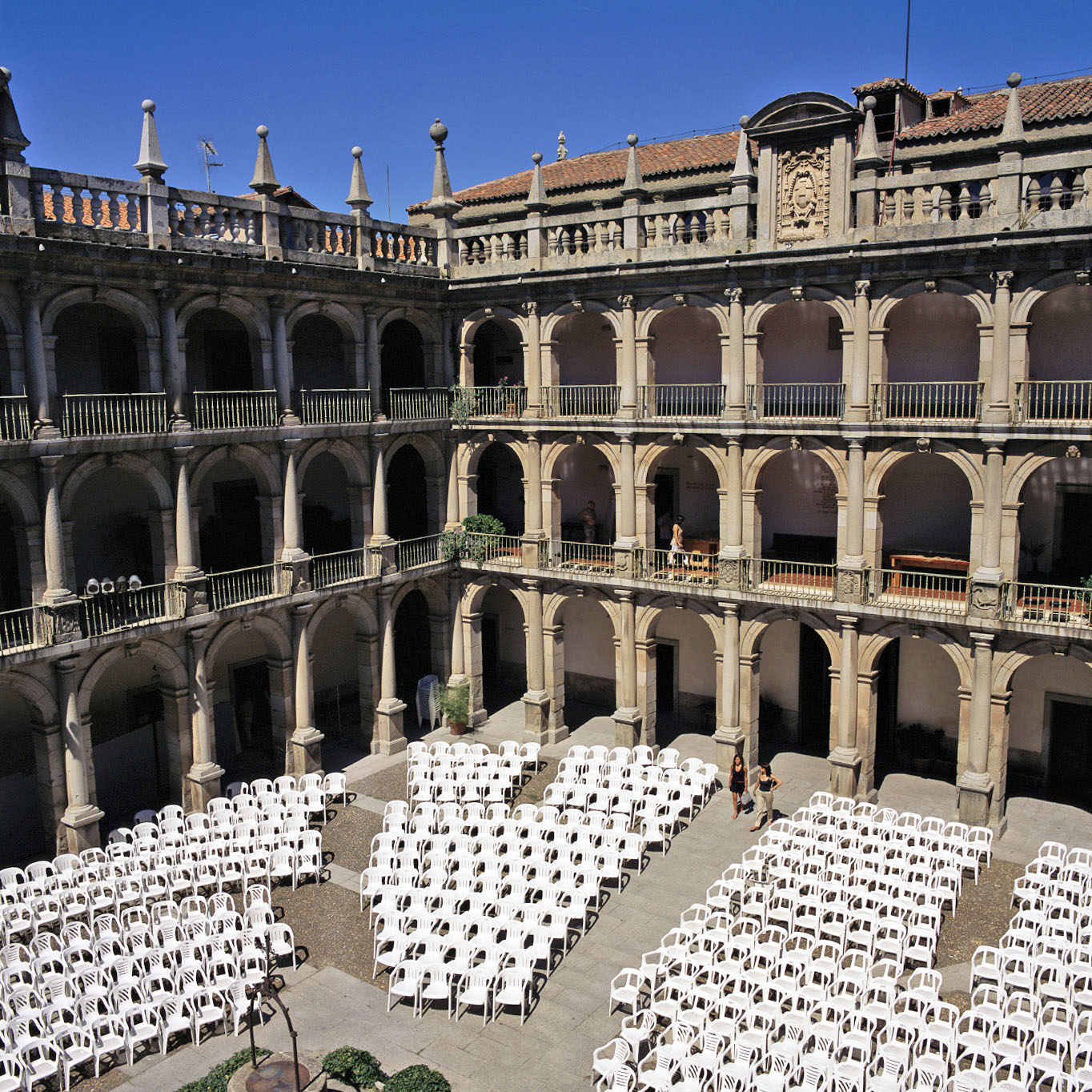
Cloister part of the university

The major landmark and one of the great prides of the city, its university, uses sites throughout the city, but has two main campuses. The first is on the north side of Alcalá. This campus includes most science departments and student housing (as well as its own, separate Renfe station). The second, central campus, houses most of the humanities and social-science departments, including a law school.

The architectural influence of the university can be found in other present-day academic institutions. The University of San Diego is largely based on the Spanish university; its campus and address take the name "Alcalá Park". In addition, some buildings at Texas Tech University in Lubbock, Texas were modeled after the architecture of Universidad de Alcalá de Henares.

In 1293 in Alcalá de Henares King Sancho IV of Castile founded the Universidad Complutense, one of the oldest universities in the world, as a Studium Generale. With the patronage of Cardinal Cisneros, it was recognized in a 1499 papal bull, and quickly gained international fame as a main centre of learning of the Renaissance thanks to the production of the Complutensian Polyglot Bible in 1517, which is the basis for most of the current translations. By royal decree, the university moved to Madrid in 1836 (initially as the Universidad de Madrid, later as the Universidad Central, which in the 1970s would finally be renamed Universidad Complutense de Madrid). A new university was founded in the old buildings as the Universidad de Alcalá in 1977. Parts of the new university occupy the buildings of the old Universidad Complutense in the city centre, including the modern Colegio de San Ildefonso, the Colegio de Málaga and other Colegios, and the structures have served as a model for other universities across the Spanish territories in the Americas and other dependencies.

The university chapel dedicated to Saint Ildefonso has a monument to the university's founder, Cardinal Cisneros, by Fancelli, an Italian sculptor.

Although the present university is named "Universidad de Alcalá", the ancient institution founded by Cisneros is the one now called "Universidad Complutense", translocated in the capital city of Madrid ("Complutensis" is the Latin word for "native of Alcalá"). The modern university is related to the original institution in name only, although it occupies the former buildings of the Complutense.

== Cathedral ==
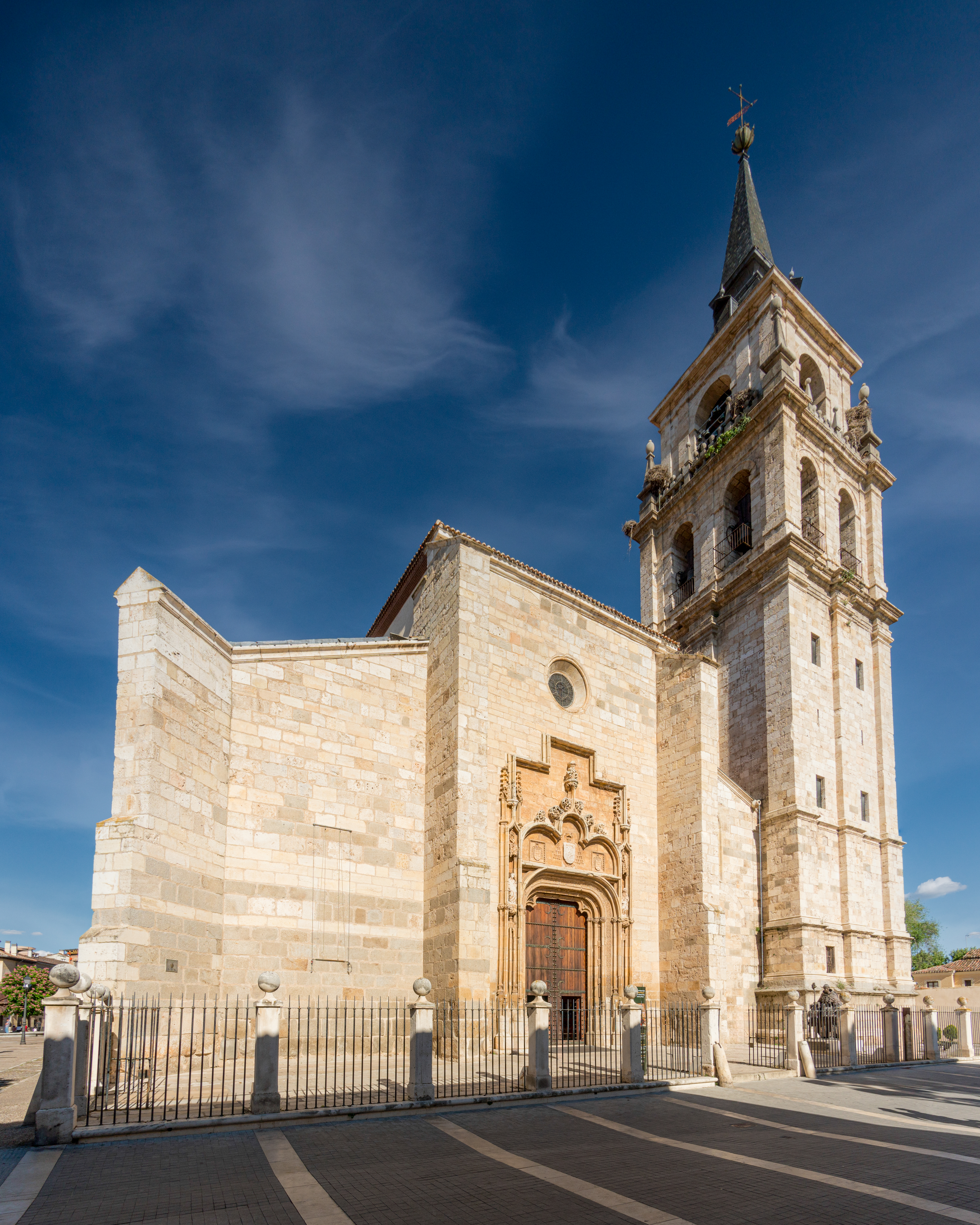
Cathedral of the Santos Niños.

The Magistral Cathedral of Saint Justus and Saint Pastor and Saint Peter's of Leuven are the only churches worldwide to hold the title of Magistral, as their canons are required to be doctors in Theology. The archbishop Carrillo (1446-1482) elevated the church to the rank of collegiate church. The current building was designed during the time of Cardinal Cisneros (1495-1517) he was awarded the title of "Master" and the current building was designed and constructed between 1497 and 1516 in late Gothic style typical of the age. The tower was built between 1528 and 1582.

It was declared Bien de Interés Cultural in 1904. During the Spanish Civil War (1936-1939), the church was burned. It lost virtually all its treasures in the fire, saving some bars and some chairs from the old choir. In 1991 the diocese of Alcalá restored and elevated to the status of cathedral-master, the Diocese Complutense recovering that which was from the 5th century until 1099.

The Cathedral of Alcalá is notable as one of only two churches in the world to be granted the special title "magistral" (along with St. Peter's Church in Leuven, Belgium). The title reflects its former status as a collegiate church, and derives from the requirement that all of the canons of the cathedral must possess the academic distinction of Doctor of Theology in order to serve there. In addition to that of Saints Justus and Pastor, the cathedral also houses the tomb of renowned 17th-century Spanish sculptor Gregorio Fernández.

== Other buildings ==
The city is also home to the Archbishops Palace. This site is where Christopher Columbus and King Ferdinand planned the excursion to the West as well as the birthplace of Catherine of Aragon, daughter of Ferdinand and Isabella, who would be the first wife of King Henry VIII of England and therefore queen consort of England.

Alcalá's Corral of Comedies, which hosts a full program of theatre and is open for tours, is the oldest documented corral in the history of Spain.

== The city today ==
The center of the city remains essentially medieval, with many winding cobbled streets, and many historic buildings. The city centre surrounds the Plaza de Cervantes and is traversed by a long pedestrian main street, the Calle Mayor. The city includes the Moorish quarter, the Jewish quarter, and the Christian quarter. These distinct neighborhoods have given Alcalá the reputation of "the city of three cultures".

The old city centre has been largely preserved, unlike the suburbs. There has been no clear planning by the city councillors regarding expansion, and the sprawling suburban areas are irregularly constructed, with the addition of 1970s-style high rise blocks in many places.

One of the most important streets in the city is the Calle del Cardenal Cisneros which takes tourists from the Madrid Gate at the entrance of the city, to the old city center and the cathedral in Santos Niños Square. The main park of Alcalá, Parque Municipal O'Donnell is a major recreational center for city residents and lies along a main road of Alcalá, Vía Complutense.

Recent archaeological excavations have opened up the city's Roman forum where a large complex comprising a basilica, public baths, a cryptoporticus, a market and a large monumental façade stands out. Alongside the forum is the Domus with an extraordinary collection of Roman domestic mural paintings. On the outskirts is the House of Hippolytus, an old school. In turn, the Regional Archaeology Museum (MAR) holds highly valuable mosaics.

The city hosts a large population of international students due to the presence of the university, and in particular its Spanish language and literature programs for foreign students. Alcalingua, a branch of University of Alcalá, is one of the major foreign language learning centers for students from abroad.

=== The storks ===
Alcalá is well known for its population of white storks. Their large nests can be observed atop many of the churches and historic buildings in the city, and are themselves a significant tourist attraction. Situated in the lowlands of the Henares river, the city is an attractive home for the migratory storks due to the wide availability of food and nesting material in the area.

For over twenty years, Alcalá's storks have been counted and studied, and the active protection and maintenance of their nests is by official policy. Although once in danger of disappearing, with only eleven pairs counted between 1986 and 1987, the population has grown to around 90 resident pairs today, many of which have shortened the distance and duration of their typical migrations to remain in the city nearly all year.

== Immigration ==
Some 18% of the population are of foreign origin, according to the official data, a large part of the newcomers (30%) are immigrants from Eastern Europe. Many Chinese businesses have also been established in the city.

As of 2014, one in every ten inhabitants of Alcalá de Henares were immigrants from Romania, with a total number of 21,892 or 10.6% of the city's population. This gave the city one of the largest Romanian communities in Spain. Most of the immigrants came from Transylvania, especially from Alba Iulia, a city twinned with Alcalá de Henares. From that year onwards, the number began to decline constantly until reaching 12,362 in 2025, a 43.7% decrease. The decrease occurred amid changes in economic conditions and the quality of life in both Romania and Spain, with many Romanians returning to Romania. This reflected the situation experienced by Polish immigrants in the city, which went from a peak of under 4,000 to barely around 1,000 as of 2025. In 2006, for the first time in Spain, Romanian immigrants in the city created a political party of their own, the Romanian Independent Party (Partido Independiente Rumano, PIR), for the upcoming 2007 Spanish local elections.

== Politics ==
The current mayor of the municipality is Judith Piquet, of the PP. In the most recent 2023 elections, the PP benefitted from the fall of Ciudadanos, as happened nationally.

Party	Votes	%	+/-	Seats	+/-
PSOE	35,014	37.17	0.28	11	▼1
PP	33,485	35.54	18.61	11	6
Vox	10,929	11.60	3.75	3	1
Más Madrid	6,086	6.46	4.02	2	2
United Left	2,674	2.83	New	0	New
Ciudadanos	2,328	2.47	▼16.66	0	▼6
Humanist	279	0.29	▼0.1	0	0
Falange	146	0.15	New	0	New
No overall control					

== Transport ==
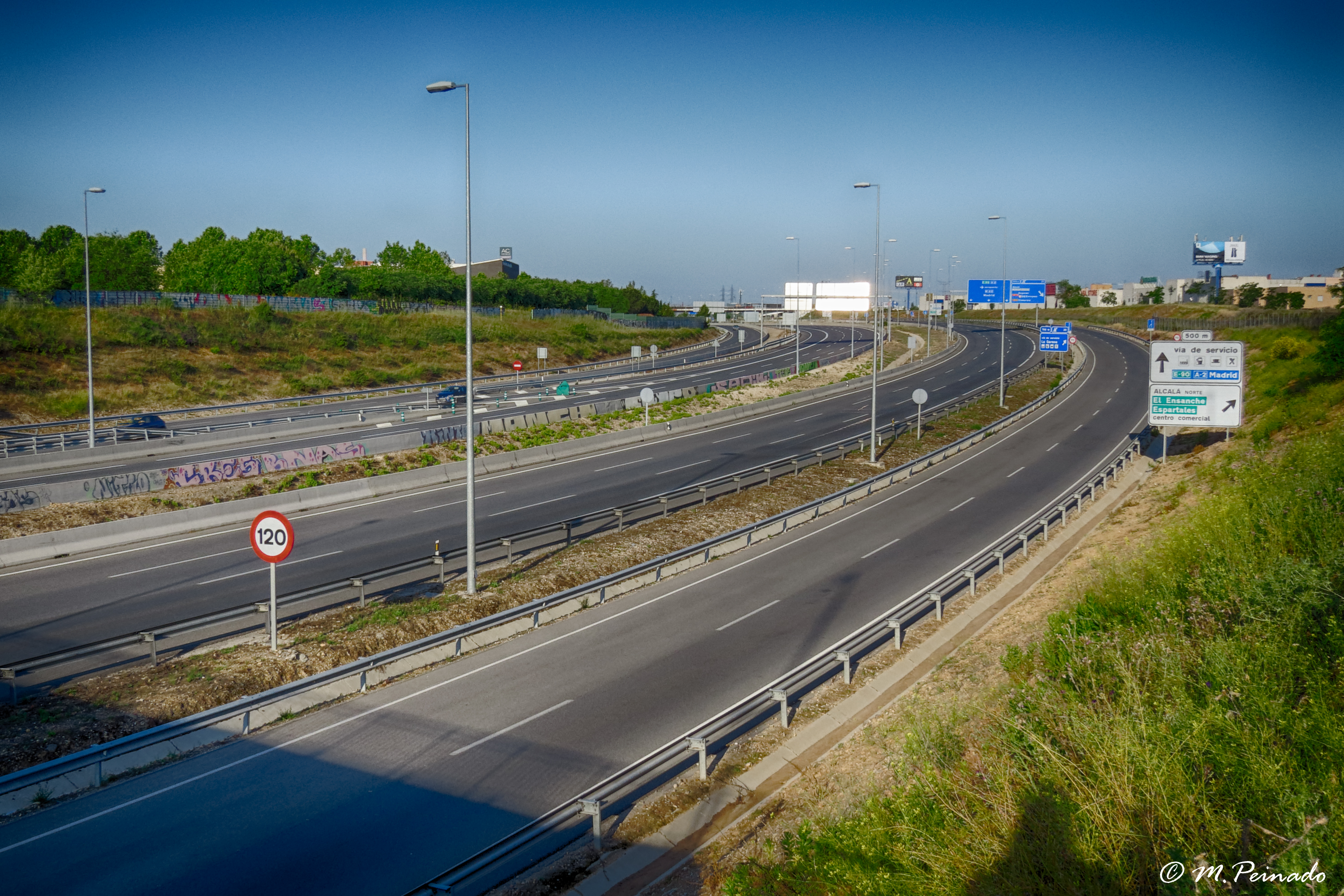
The A-2 highway as it passes through the municipality

Alcalá's excellent transport links with Madrid have led to its becoming a commuter town, with many of its inhabitants travelling to work in the capital. By Cercanias (railway) is the lines C2 and C7 that links Alcalá de Henares with Madrid in 35 minutes, or Guadalajara in 25 minutes, also exists in the peak hours trains called CIVIS, direct train, that makes the journey in 20 minutes. Also it is linked by bus to Madrid, Guadalajara and several towns and villages in nearby. By car, Alcalá de Henares is well linked with the state roads network with the nearby A-2, the highway which starts in Madrid and continues on to Barcelona and to France.

Alcalá also has an intensive bus system called "Alcalá-Bus" which runs to all the major neighborhoods and costs 1,30 euro per ride.

== Culture ==
=== Cervantine city ===
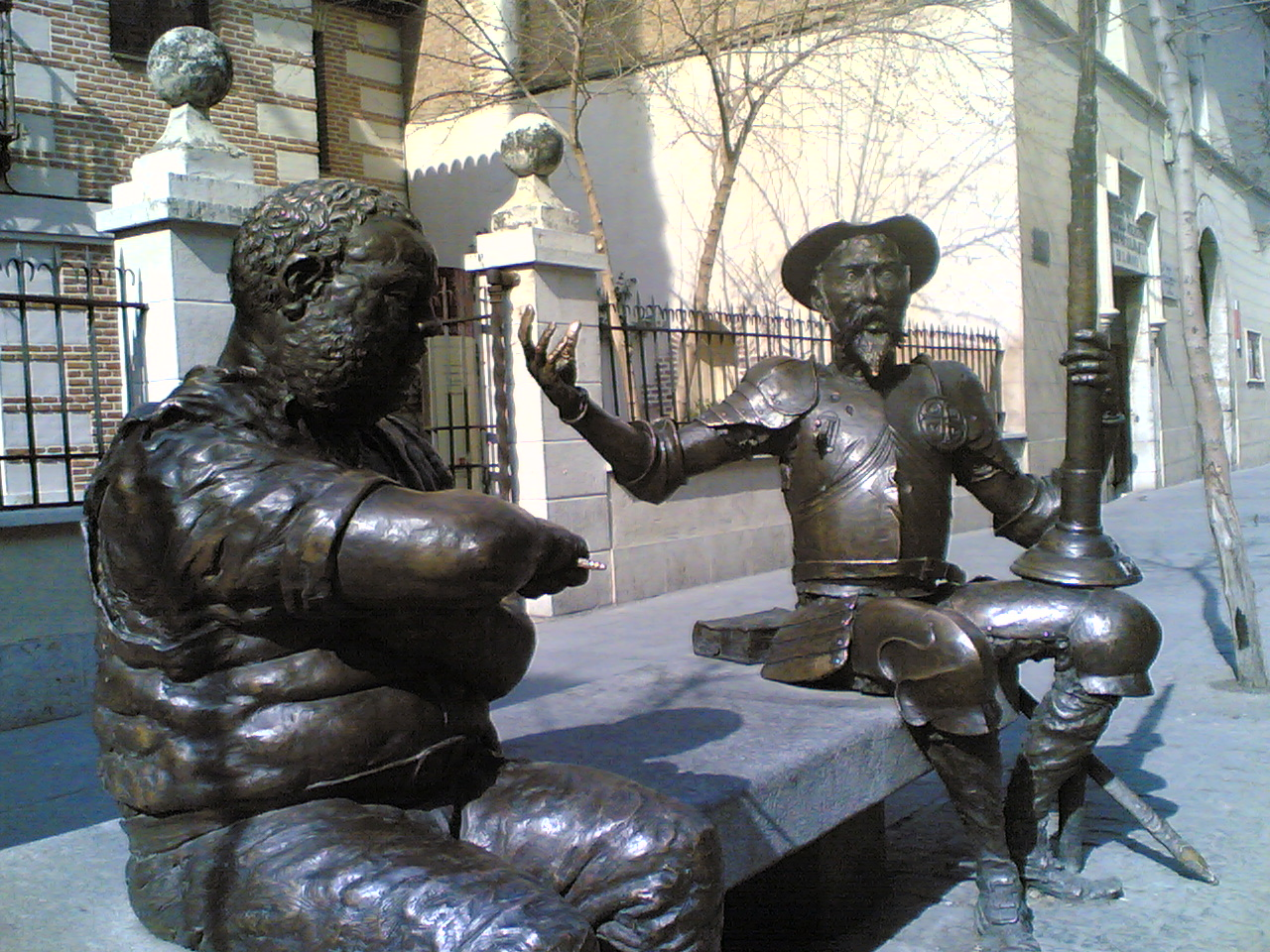
Statues of Don Quixote and Sancho Panza outside Cervantes' birthplace

The city celebrates the birthday of native son Miguel de Cervantes on 9 October every year and organizes an annual Cervantes festival, the Semana Cervantina (Cervantine Week).

Every year on 23 April, the anniversary of Cervantes' death, the city of Alcalá hosts the Miguel de Cervantes Prize, the Spanish-speaking world's most prestigious award for lifetime achievement in literature. The award is presented by the king of Spain at the University of Alcalá's historic Colegio de San Ildefonso. Speeches about the importance of the Spanish language are customarily given by the king, the minister of culture and the laureate. The ceremony attracts a wide range of dignitaries to the city including members of the royal family, the prime minister, and others. During this ceremony the citizens of Alcalá can be heard singing the city's song, entitled "Alcalá de Henares".

Alcalá de Henares is a member (and promoter) of the Red de Ciudades Cervantinas (Network of Cervantine Cities).

=== Festivals ===
Alcalá hosts an annual "Noche en Blanco". During this festival the streets are filled with music, art, theatre, and dance as the city residents celebrate Alcalá's rich cultural heritage. The festival goes well into the night and centers around the Plaza de Cervantes where stages are set up to host the performances.

== International relations ==
=== Twin towns – sister cities ===
Alcalá de Henares has reached twin town and sister city agreements with:

- Talence, France (1985).
- Peterborough, United Kingdom (1986).
- Guanajuato, Mexico (1990).
- San Diego, United States (1990).
- Fort Collins, United States (1995).
- Plaza de la Revolución, Cuba (1998).
- Lublin, Poland (2001).
- Alba Iulia, Romania (2005).
- Azul, Argentina (2011).

Saint Didacus, known as San Diego in Spanish, was born in Alcalá de Henares and is the namesake for the city of San Diego, United States. Alcalá de Henares is the birthplace of Catherine of Aragon; it is twinned with the English city of Peterborough in England, her final resting place.

== Notable people ==
- Miguel de Cervantes (1547–1616), Spanish writer who is widely regarded as the greatest writer in the Spanish language and one of the world's pre-eminent novelists. His major work, Don Quixote, is considered the first modern novel, a classic of Western literature.
- Juan Ruiz (1283–1350), known as the Archpriest of Hita, was a medieval Castilian poet. He is best known for his ribald, earthy poem, Libro de buen amor ("The Book of Good Love").
- Catherine of Aragon (1485–1536), the last surviving child of Queen Isabella I of Castile and King Ferdinand II of Aragon, was born in the Archbishop's palace in Alcalá de Henares on December 16, 1485. She was Queen of England from June 1509 until May 1533 as the first wife of King Henry VIII.
- Ferdinand I, Holy Roman Emperor (1503–1564), Holy Roman Emperor from 1558, king of Bohemia and Hungary from 1526, and king of Croatia from 1527 until his death
- Manuel Azaña (1880–1940), Prime Minister and President of the Second Spanish Republic
- Antonio Claudio Álvarez de Quiñones (1670s–1736), Roman Catholic Archbishop of Bogotá
- Pedro Obiang (born 1992), professional footballer for Italian club U.S. Sassuolo Calcio
- Roberto Sánchez (born 1989), Spanish footballer
- Demetrio Lozano (born 1975), World Champion from 2005 in handball

== See also ==
- Complutenses, authors of the courses of Scholastic philosophy, theology and moral theology who were lecturers of the philosophical college of the Discalced Carmelites at Alcalá de Henares
- Hermitage of San Isidro (Alcalá de Henares)
