= Fancelli =

Fancelli is a surname. Notable people with the surname include:

- Luca Fancelli (1430–1494), Italian architect
- Cosimo Fancelli (1620–1688), Italian sculptor
- Chiarissimo Fancelli (died 1632), Italian sculptor
- Domenico Fancelli (1469–1519), Italian sculptor
- Pietro Fancelli (1764–1850), Italian painter
- Petronio Fancelli (1734–1800), Italian painter
- Giacomo Antonio Fancelli (1619–1671), Italian sculptor
