= Roberto Sanchez =

Roberto Sanchez may refer to:

- Roberto Sanchez (fighter) (born 1986), American mixed martial artist
- Roberto Sánchez (footballer) (born 1989), Spanish professional footballer
- Roberto Sánchez (hurdler) (born 1910), Mexican hurdler
- Roberto Sánchez Mantecón (born 1996), Spanish athlete
- Roberto Sánchez (Peruvian politician) (born 1969), Peruvian psychologist and politician
- Roberto Sánchez Vilella (1913–1997), governor of Puerto Rico
- Roberto Sánchez Ramos (born 1960), judge of the Court of Appeals and attorney general of Puerto Rico
- Roberto Antonio Sánchez (born 1966), Argentine politician
- Roberto Carlos Sanchez Alvarez (born 1987), Panamanian chess international master
- Roberto Sánchez (Chilean politician) (1879-1947), Chilean lawyer, diplomat, and politician

== See also ==
- Roberto Sánchez Vilella School of Public Administration, graduate school of the University of Puerto Rico
- Sandro de América (1945–2010), Argentine singer and actor born Roberto Sánchez Ocampo
- Robert Sanchez (disambiguation)
