= Hermitage of San Isidro (Alcalá de Henares) =

Cultural property in Alcalá de Henares

- Ermita de San Isidro (Spanish)
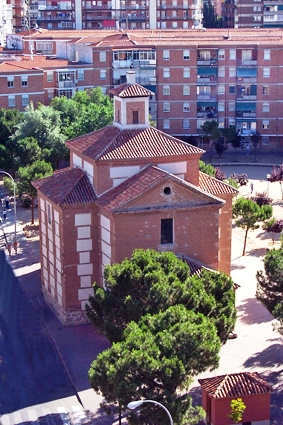

- Location within Spain
- 40.487877°N 3.361774°W
- Location: Alcalá de Henares, Spain

Spanish Cultural Heritage
- Official name: Ermita de San Isidro
- Type: Non-movable
- Criteria: Monument
- Designated: 1995
- Reference no.: RI-51-0009010

The Hermitage of San Isidro (Spanish: Ermita de San Isidro) is a hermitage located in Alcalá de Henares, Spain. It was declared Bien de Interés Cultural in 1995.
