= Palace of Laredo =

Palace located in Alcalá de Henares, Spain

Palace Laredo
- Palacete Laredo (Spanish)
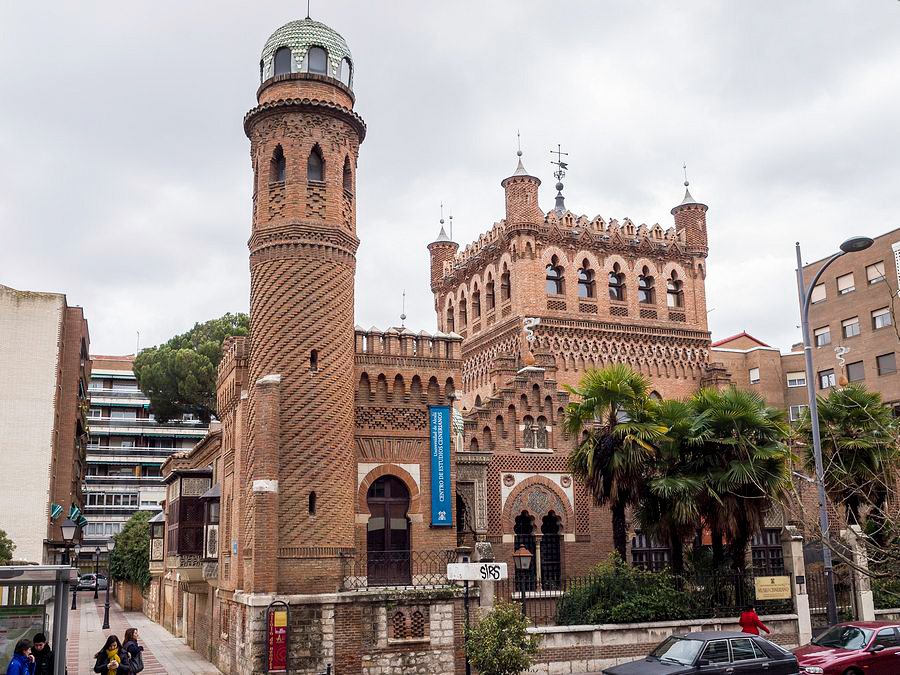

- Location within Spain
- 40.487836°N 3.363925°W
- Location: Alcalá de Henares, Spain

Site notes
- Architectural style: Neomudejar

Spanish Cultural Heritage
- Official name: Palacio Laredo o Quinta La Gloria
- Type: Non-movable
- Criteria: Monument
- Designated: 1975
- Reference no.: RI-51-0004172

The Palace Laredo (Spanish: Palacete Laredo) is a palace located in Alcalá de Henares, Spain. It was declared Bien de Interés Cultural in 1975.

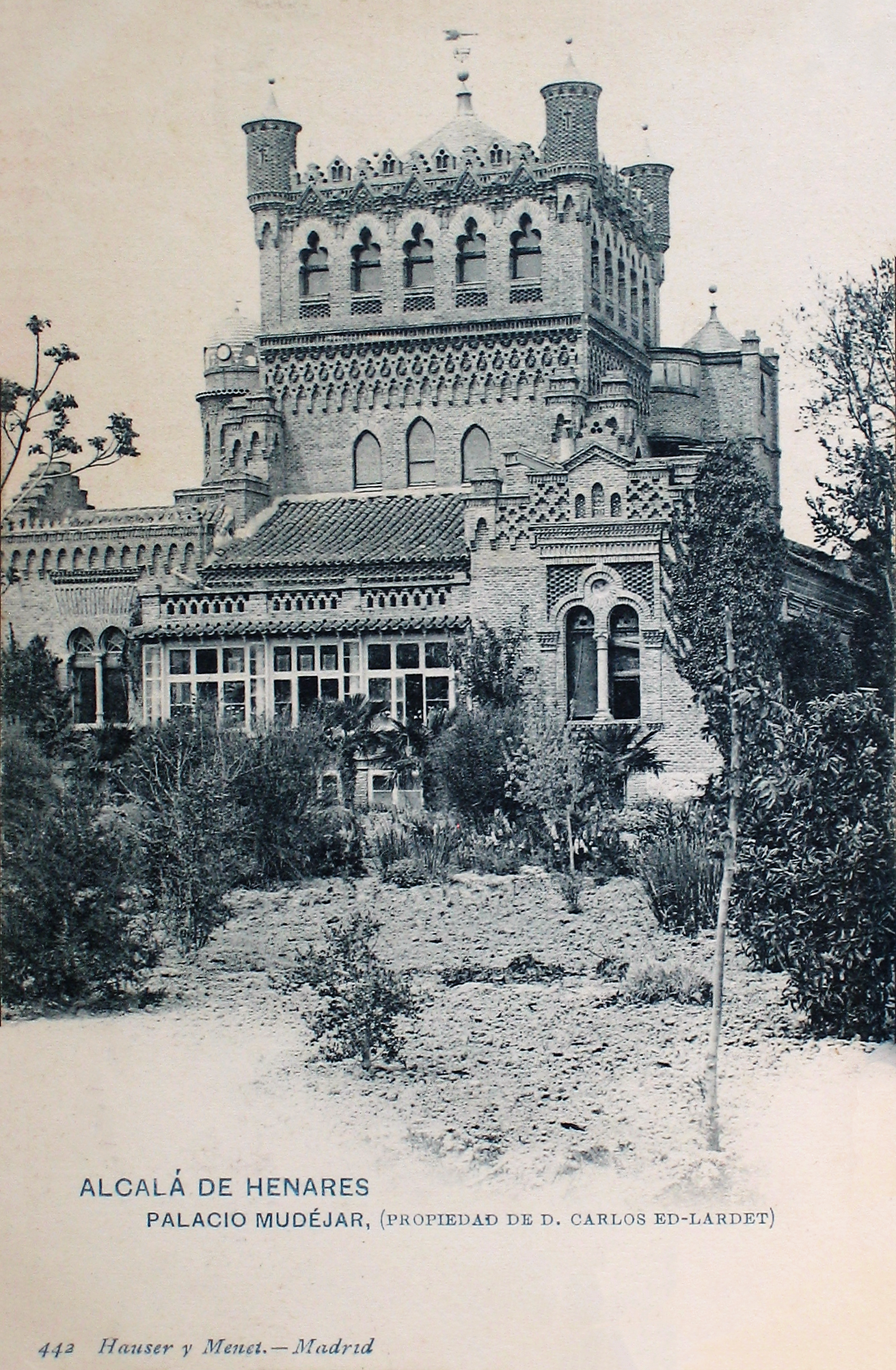
Palace of Laredo (Hauser y Menet ca. 1912).

== History ==
It was also known as the Hotel Laredo, not because it acted as a hotel, but because it was isolated at the time of construction and housed a single family. It is located in the path to the station (Spanish: Paseo de la Estacion') in the city of Alcala de Henares in Madrid, Spain. It was built by Manuel Jose Laredo and Ordoño as a private residence, from 1880 to 1884. Its design style is Neomudejar and it has decorations inside that fit the style, such as tiles and plasters. The architect of this building was José de Urquijo.

It was sold to by its owner in 1895 to his moneylender, the watchmaker and Swiss consul Carlos Eduardo Lardet Bovet. Laredo then left to live in Madrid, where he died the next year. In 1918 it was purchased by Vicente Villazón Fernández who renamed it "Quinta Concepción". In 1942 it was acquired by brothers Luque and Ángel Aguilar, who divided and sold plots of the farmland surrounding the residence. The descendants of Aguilar-Luque donated the palace in 1973 to the Community of Alcala de Henares. In the 1980s it was restored by architect Genoveva Christoff Secretan. Once the restoration was finished, it was given to the University of Alcalá. It later became the property of the Community of Alcala de Henares, although managed by the University of Alcalá.

It is the headquarters of the Museum of Cisneros and the Cisnerian Research Center. It houses a collection of historical documents from the University of Alcalá including the first edition of the Complutensian Polyglot Bible and the Antwerp Bible.
