= Robert Sanchez =

Robert Sanchez is the name of:

- Robert M. Sanchez, American train engineer involved in the 2008 Chatsworth train collision
- Robert Fortune Sanchez (1934–2012), American archbishop
- Robert Sánchez (born 1997), Spanish footballer

== See also ==
- Roberto Sanchez (disambiguation)
