= Cosimo Fancelli =

Italian sculptor

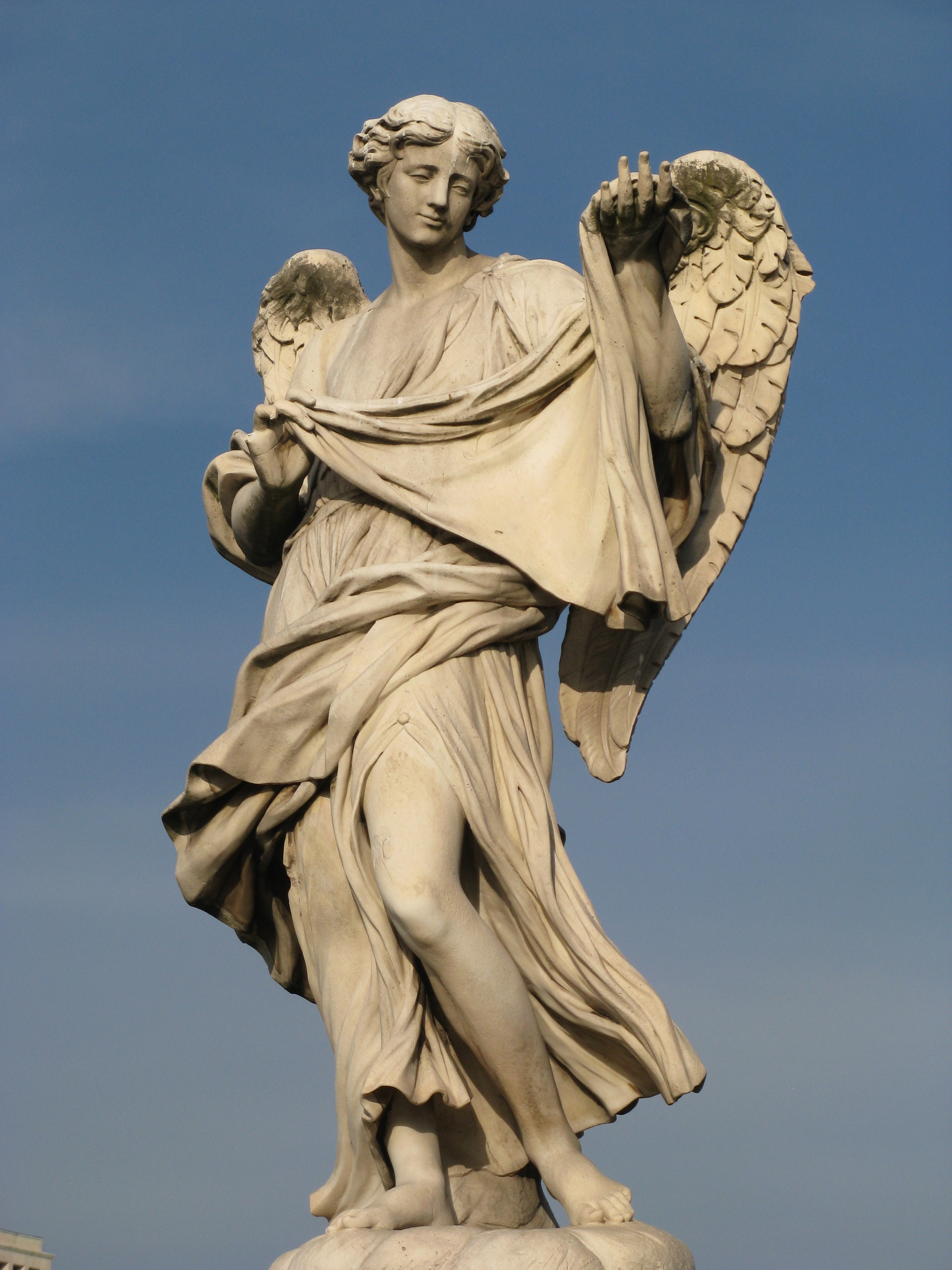
Sculpture of Angel bearing Veronica's Veil by Cosimo Fancelli at Ponte Sant Angelo.

Cosimo Fancelli (c.1620 – 3 April 1688) was an Italian sculptor of the Baroque period, active mainly in Rome. He worked on a number of commissions with Pietro da Cortona from 1647 until Cortona's death in 1669. Gian Lorenzo Bernini considered him one of the best sculptors in Rome.

== Life ==
Cosimo Fancelli was born in Rome, the son of Carlo Fancelli, a stonecutter from Settignano. Like his older brother, the sculptor Giacomo Antonio Fancelli, he began his career as an assistant in the studio of Gian Lorenzo Bernini.

Around 1645 he did a relief of "Christ and the mother of SS. Giacomo ex Giovanni" for Santa Maria Portae Paradisi. Around 1646 Fancelli sculpted the statue of "Justice" in the Cappella della Sacra Famiglia at the Church of the Gesù. In 1647-48 he created with his brother the stucco figures of Clemenza and Contemplazione on the pendentives of the second arch to the right of the central nave of St. Peter's Basilica and collaborated on the ornamentation of the pillars. He also worked in repairing and restoring statues.

In 1647 he allied with Pietro da Cortona to work on the frescoes of Santa Maria in Vallicella, a project that took intermittently twenty years. In 1664–65 Fancelli provided the elaborate white and gilt stucco work framing Cortona's nave vault fresco of the 'Miracle of the Madonna della Vallicella'. On this he also worked with Ercole Ferrata.

He and his brother sculpted the figure of the Nile in the Fountain of the Four Rivers at Piazza Navona. By 1652, Bernini considered Cosimo Fancelli one of the best sculptors in Rome.

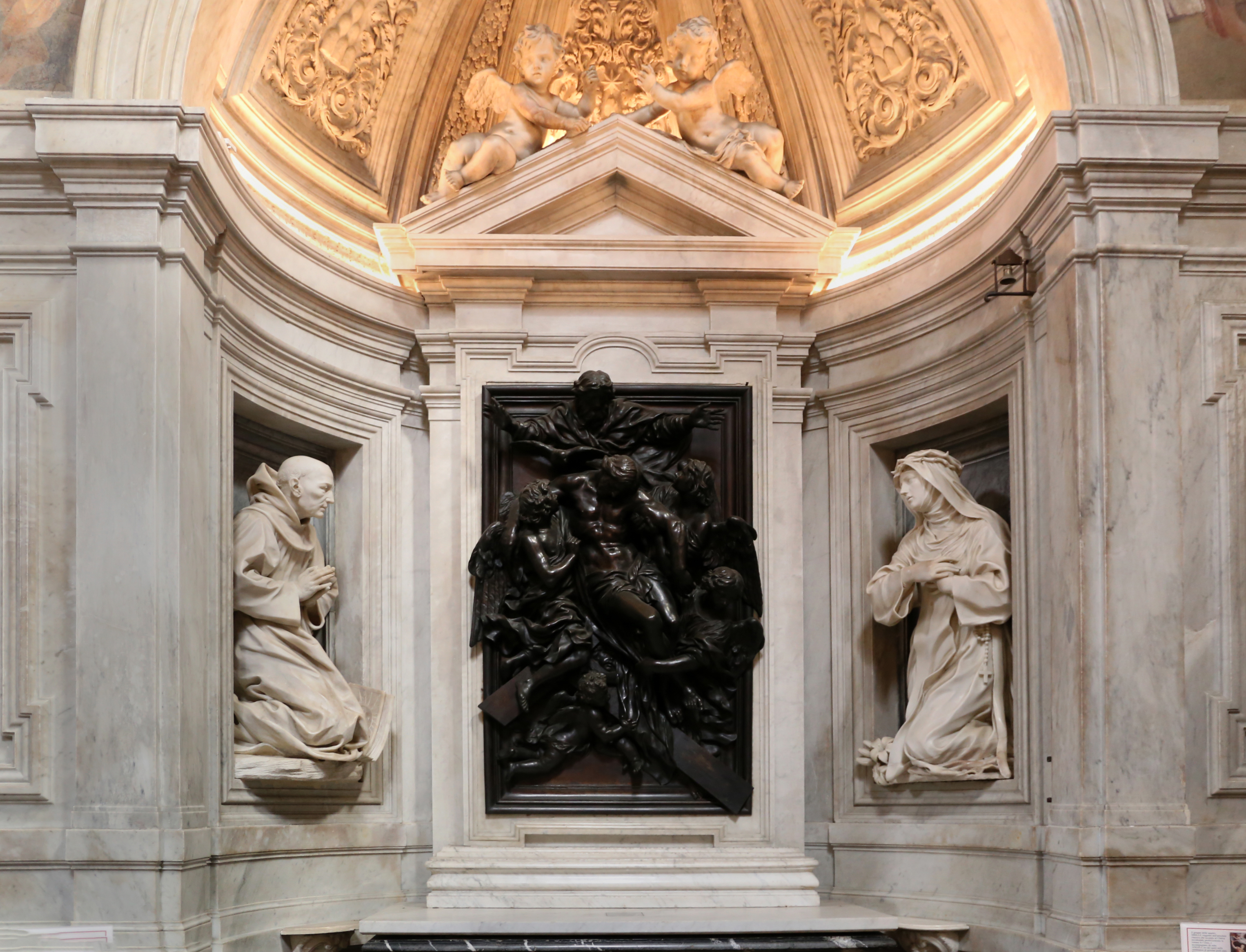
Cappella chigi di s. m. della pace

The bronze altarpiece of the "Deposition", for the Chigi Chapel at Santa Maria della Pace, was modeled by Fancelli from a drawing by Cortona, and cast by Artusi. It is considered one of Fancelli's best work.

Cortona and Fancelli worked together on the decoration at Santi Luca e Martina (c. 1649), Santa Maria della Pace (1656), San Carlo al Corso (after 1665), and the vault of the Chiesa Nuova (1662–65). For an altar in the lower church of Santa Maria in Via Lata (1661) he created a bas relief depicting the "Rest on the Flight to Egypt". It has since been relocated to a room next the sacristy.

He also worked with Francesco Borromini on the Re Magi Chapel at the Propaganda Fide.

In 1668 Cortona designed the ceiling fresco work for the Gavotti chapel in San Nicola da Tolentino agli Orti Sallustiani. Fancelli did the sculptural relief of the Apparition of the Blessed Virgin of Savona to Blessed Anthony Botta at the altar. In 1669, Bernini assigned him to complete the Angel with Sudarium on Ponte Sant'Angelo.

The latter part of his career, he worked regularly for two of the most important Roman families, the Borghese and the Altieri, assisted by his brother Francesco. Among his pupils was Francesco Cavallini of Carrarra.

Fancelli is described as of delicate build, not very tall, of straight black hair, fair complexion, "...of good grace, and attractive in appearance, and very honest..." He was a member of the Accademia di San Luca.

In 1654 the Fancelli married Margherita Fiammetti, with whom he had two daughters, Maddalena in 1656 and Angela in 1658. Cortona was Angela's godfather. He lived with his family for all his life in the parish of S. Nicola in Arcione, where he was born. Cosimo Fancelli died in Rome on 3 April 1688, and is buried at San Nicola da Tolentino.

== Sources ==
- Wittkower, Rudolf (1993). "Art and Architecture Italy, 1600–1750". Pelican History of Art. 1980. Penguin Books. pp. 316–317.
- Getty ULAN entry
