= Giacomo Antonio Fancelli =

Italian sculptor

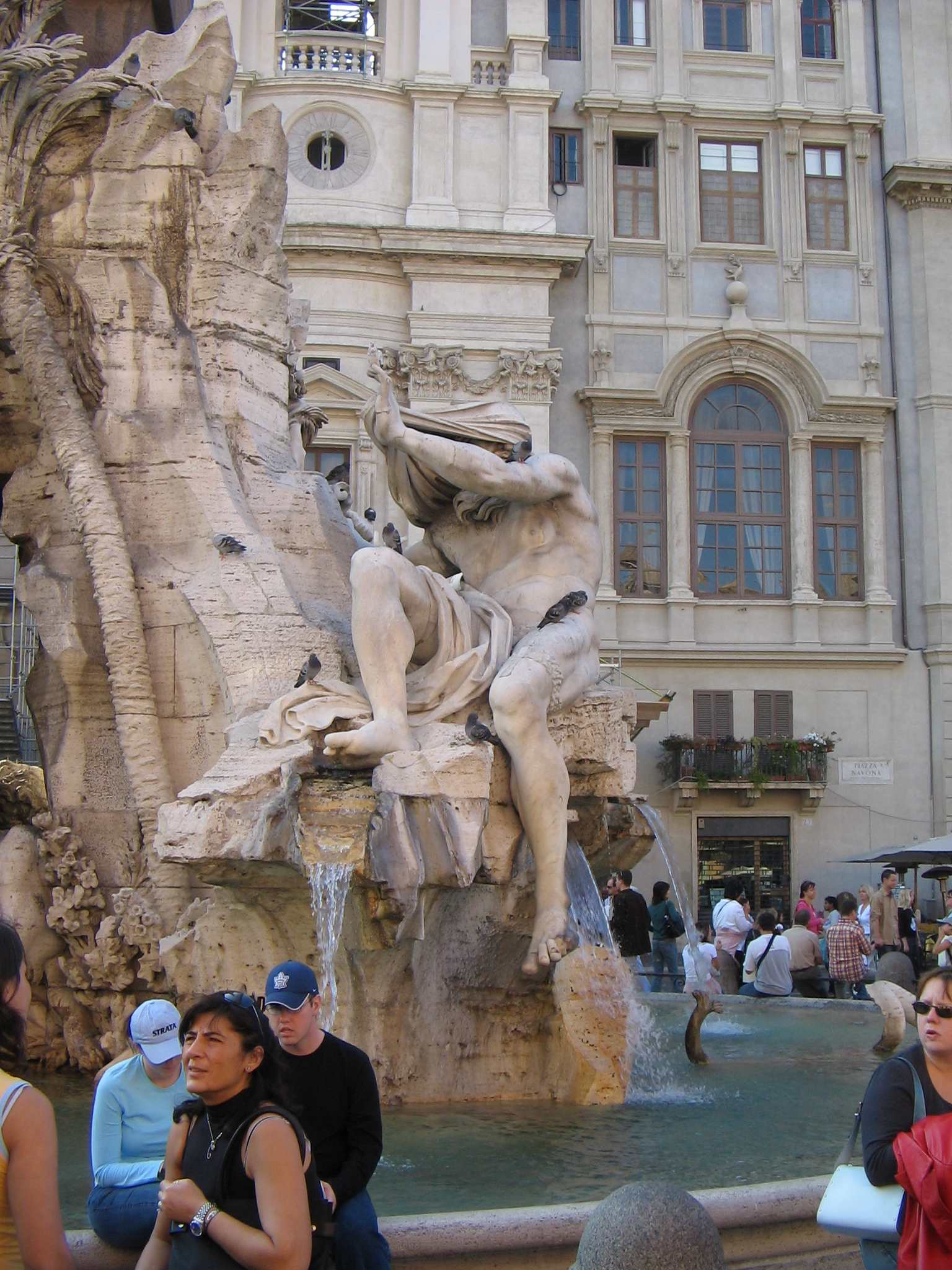
River Nile, by Fancelli

Giacomo Antonio Fancelli or Iacopo Antonio Fancelli (1606–1674) was an Italian sculptor in stone and stucco of the Baroque era.

Fancelli was born in Rome, the son of a stonecutter from Settignano. He was the brother of Cosimo Fancelli and a pupil of Bernini. In 1647-48 he created with his brother the stucco figures of "Clemenza" and "Contemplazione" on the pendentives of the second arch to the right of the central nave of St. Peter's Basilica and collaborated on the ornamentation of the pillars.

Notable among his works are Nile (hiding his face, since the River Nile's source had not yet been discovered at that date) on Bernini's Fontana dei Quattro Fiumi (completed in 1651) and St Francis (c.1647) in the church of San Bernardo alle Terme on the Quirinal in Rome.

In 1655, Carlo Rainaldi commissioned him to sculpt two angels for the facade of Sant'Andrea della Valle but only one was completed, allegedly because Fancelli stored off the job after Pope Alexander VII criticized the work, saying the pope could do the other himself.

He repaired the Medici statue of Cupid and Psyche found in 1666 on the Caelian Hill, supplying missing pieces to the base, part of Cupid’s legs, Psyche’s feet and right wing. The statue is now in the Uffizi.

The stucco decoration in San Carlo al Corso was by Giacomo and his brother Cosimo.
