= Roberto Sánchez (footballer) =

Spanish footballer

Personal information
- Full name: Roberto Sánchez Piñas
- Date of birth: 1 October 1989 (age 37)
- Place of birth: Alcalá de Henares, Spain
- Height: 1.80 m (5 ft 11 in)
- Position: Midfielder

Team information
- Current team: San Fernando

Youth career
- Rayo Vallecano

Senior career*
| Years | Team | Apps | (Gls) |
| 2007–2008 | Rayo Vallecano B | 10 | (0) |
| 2008–2010 | Marchamalo | 62 | (5) |
| 2010–2013 | Albacete B | 96 | (6) |
| 2011–2013 | Albacete | 4 | (0) |
| 2013–2015 | Torrejón | 74 | (8) |
| 2015– | San Fernando | 70 | (3) |
- * Club domestic league appearances and goals as of 14 May 2017

Roberto Sánchez Piñas (born 1 October 1989 in Alcalá de Henares, Madrid) is a Spanish footballer who plays for CD San Fernando de Henares as a midfielder.

His debut was on 2 January 2011, against Córdoba, playing the last 24 minutes of the game, after came off the bench to replace Verza.
