= St. George's Parish Church (Piran) =

Roman Catholic church in Slovenia

Coordinates: 45°31′46.26″N 13°34′7.11″E

St. George's Parish Church viewed from Piran town walls

St. George's Parish Church in Piran (Slovene: župnijska cerkev sv. Jurija v Piranu) is a Roman Catholic church located on the hill above Piran, a port town on the coast of the Adriatic Sea in southwestern Slovenia. It was built in the Venetian Renaissance architectural style and has been dedicated to Saint George. It was the life work of the stonemason Bonfante Torre from Venice.

== History ==
=== Early history ===
The first church on top of the hill was already built in the 12th century.

=== Renaissance building ===
In 1592 a construction of a new church began on the same location, replacing the old one. The construction of the new one was finished in 1614. The new free-standing bell tower, which was a separate building and was a faithful replica of St. Mark's Campanile in Venice, was finished a year later. The interior furnishings and decorations were finished by 1637, when the church was consecrated. The Renaissance front facade of the church was built in 1608, based on the early 16th-century church facades by Andrea Palladio. It features a pediment, four pilasters and a later-added Baroque pedestal, which was intended to host a statue of St. George. As the last and separate building built on the site was a baptistery, completed as an octagonal Baroque structure in 1650. Because of unstable foundations and the whole hill, enhancement walls were built in the 17th century. Additional barriers were made from the 17th to the 19th centuries on north and south sides of the hill to prevent any damage to the building. Several restorations were made afterwards.

=== Present ===
A general restoration has been launched in 1990 because of overall bad condition of the structures. Between 2002 and 2005, the main building was closed because of restorations of the frescos and statues inside. The hill was further enhanced and stabilised to prevent the structures to deform or even fall off the cliff.

The church is now a major tourist attraction and one of the most important town landmarks, as it is seen from Tartini Square as well as from many other parts of town. The bell tower is accessible for €3 via stairwell, and the church interior is accessible anytime from 7:00 to 22:00, although the inner hall can be entered only during mass. In front of the church portal is a large lawn which used to be a graveyard, and is now a spot for tourists to see the whole Bay of Trieste, as well as the town and nearby coastal settlements.

== Gallery ==
Exterior

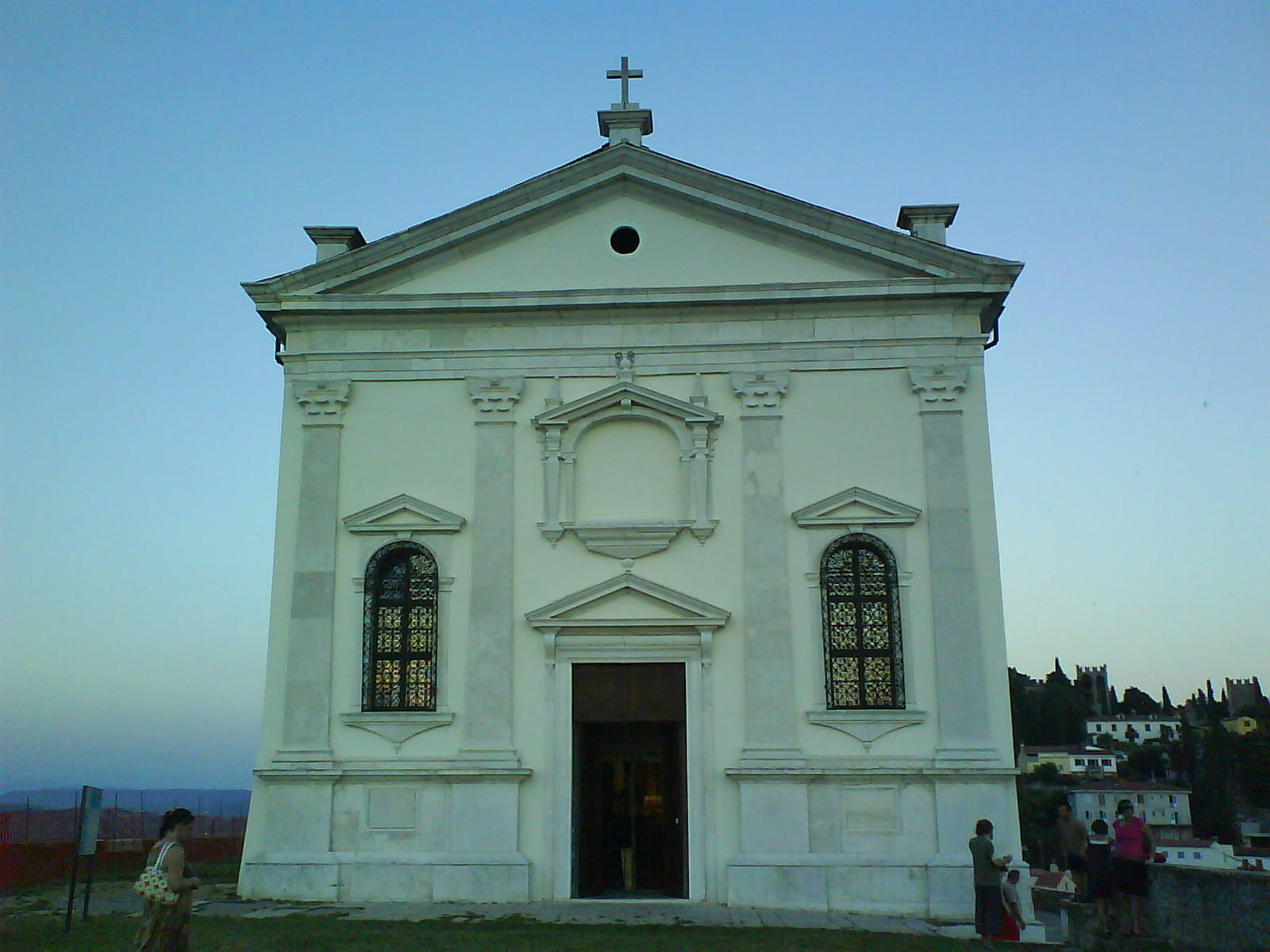
Renaissance front facade

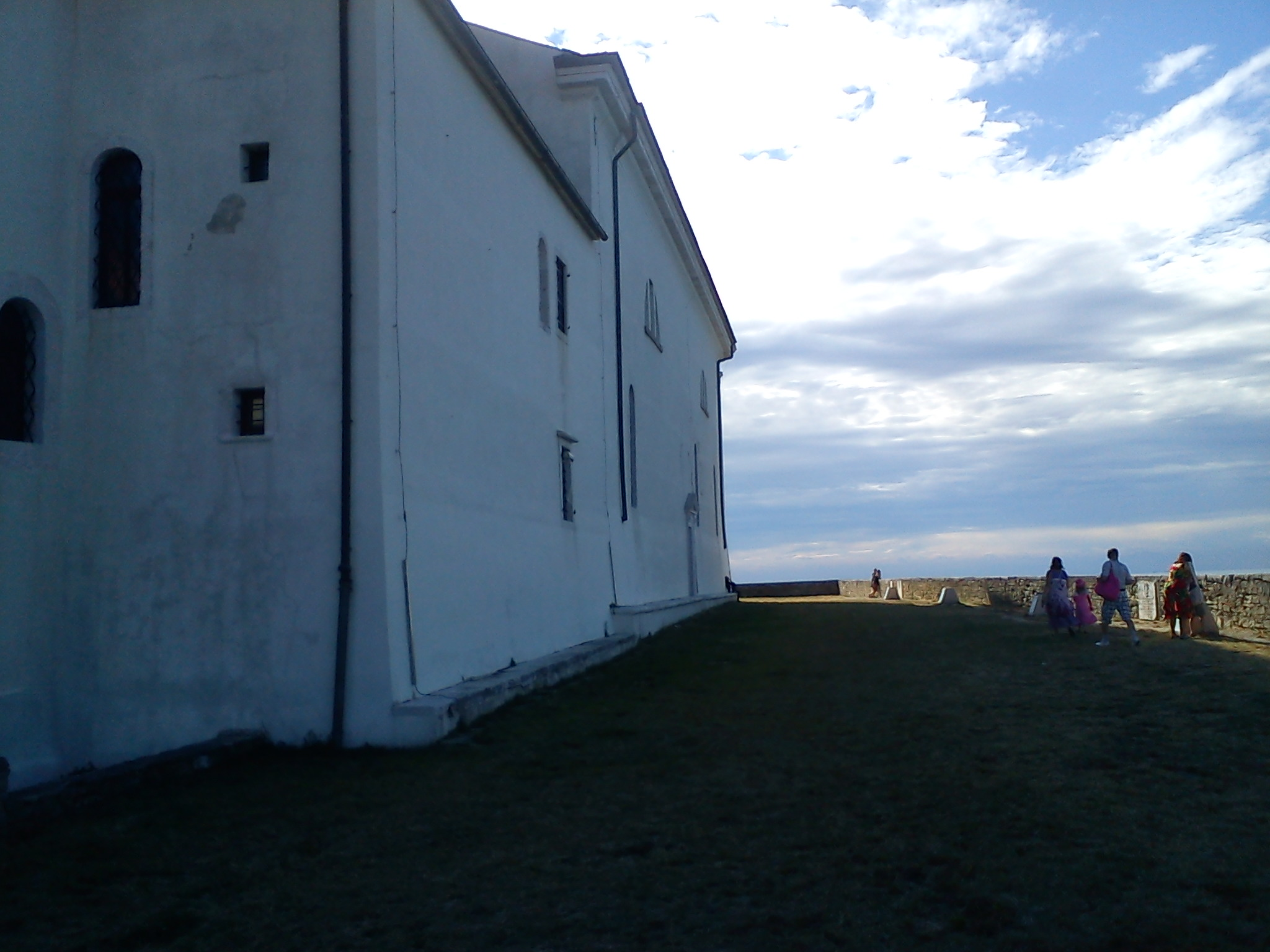
Former graveyard area

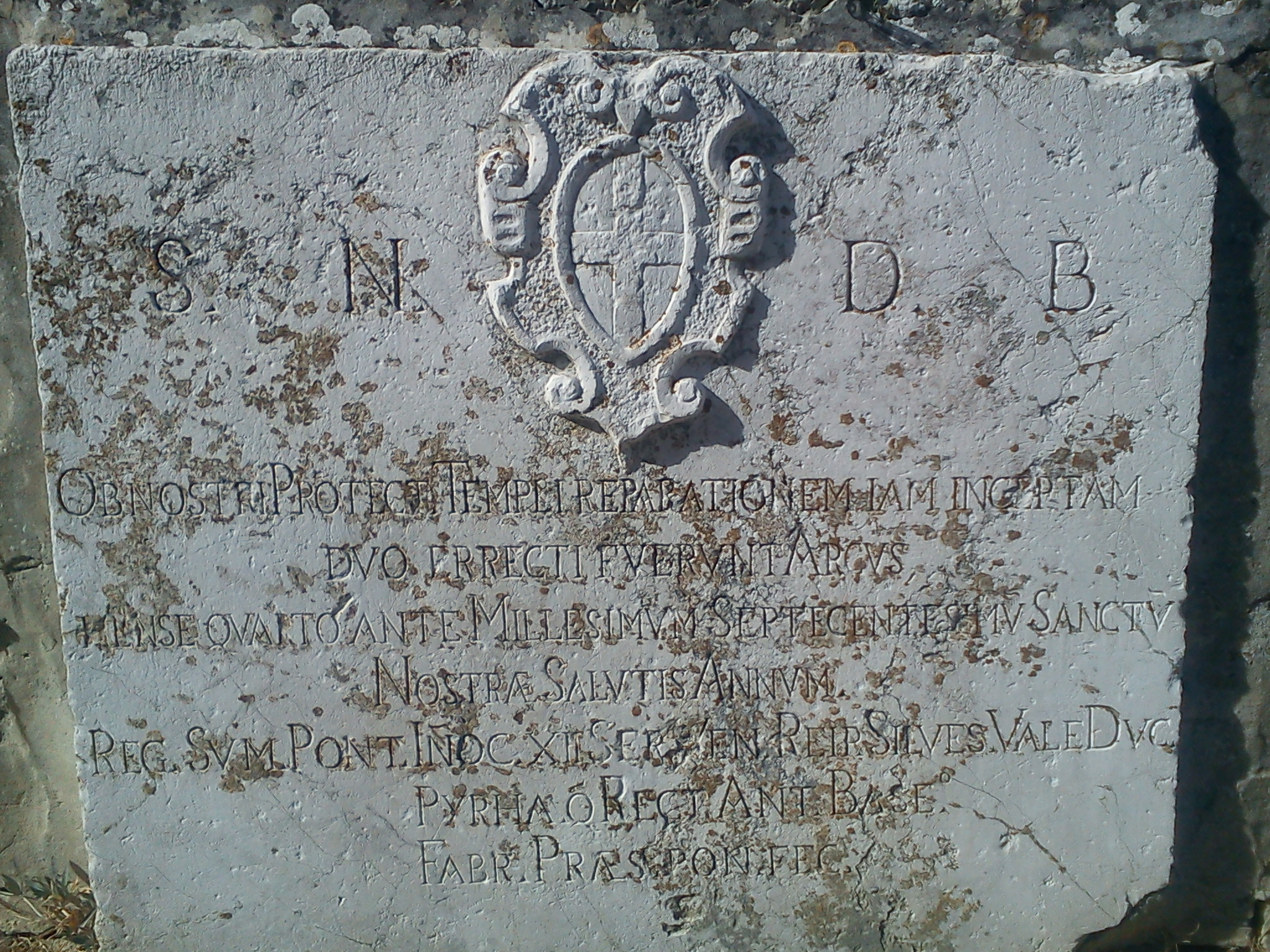
A remaining tombstone of the former graveyard

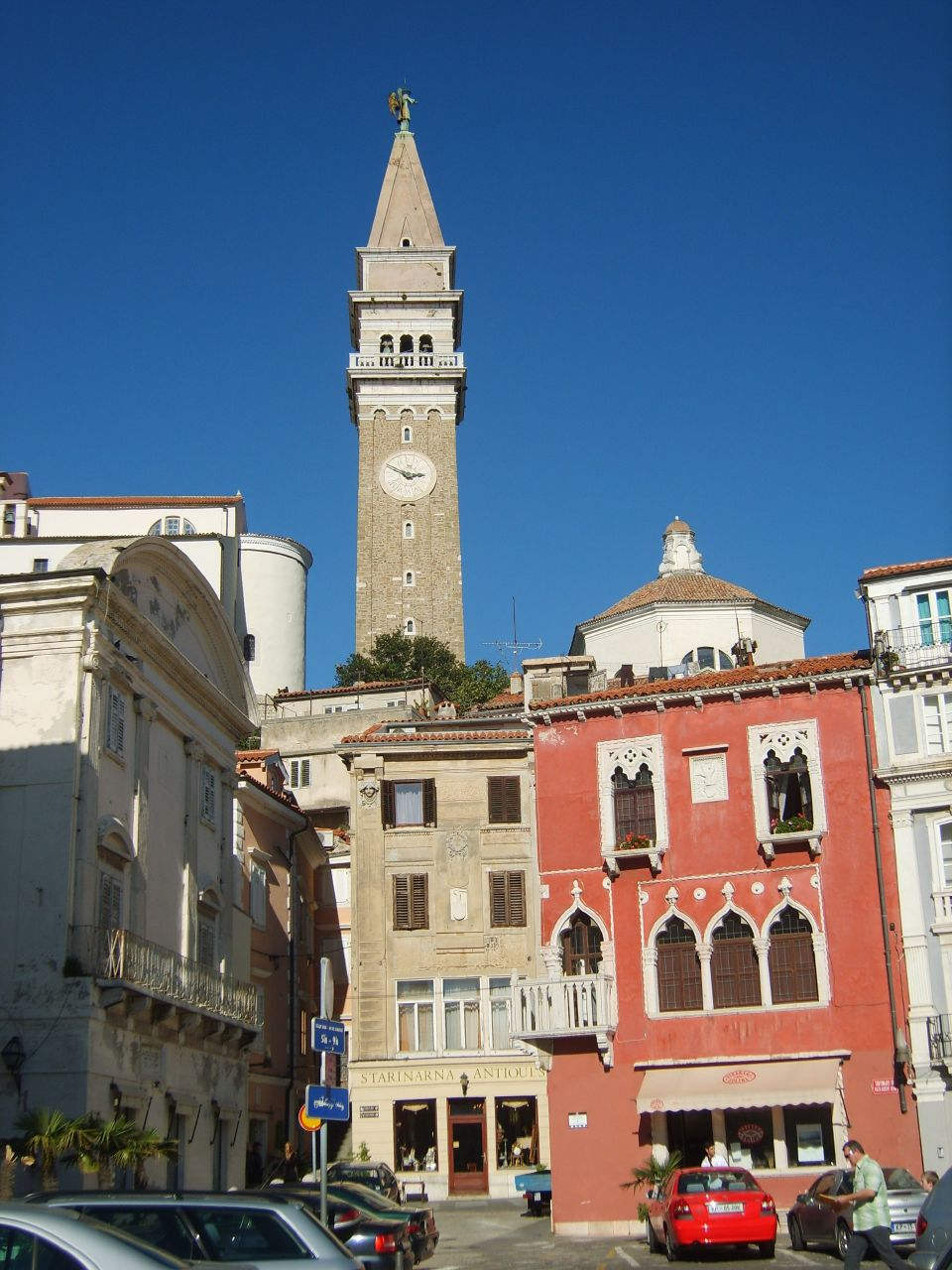
View of the belltower from Tartini Square

Interior

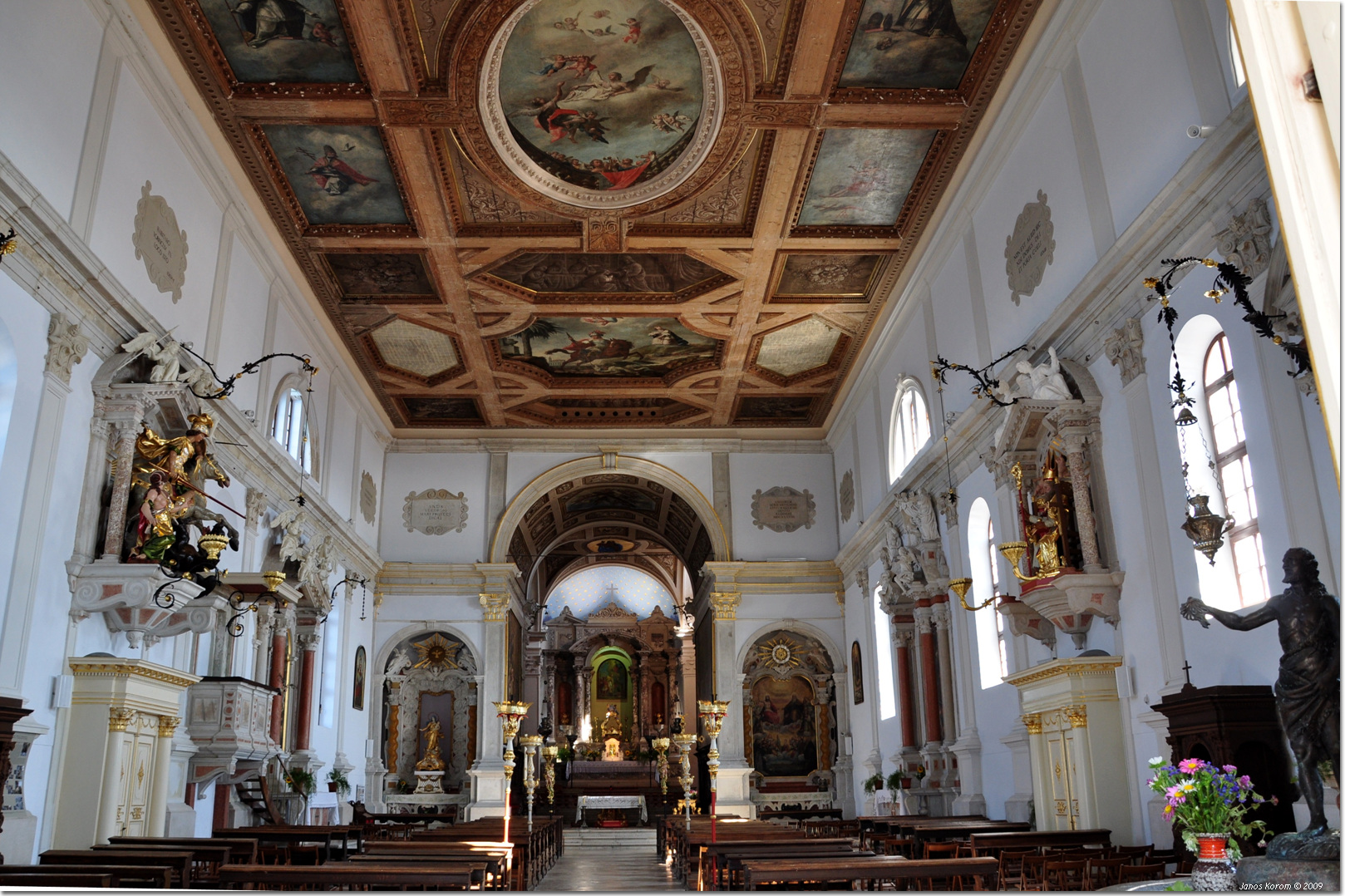
Interior of the church

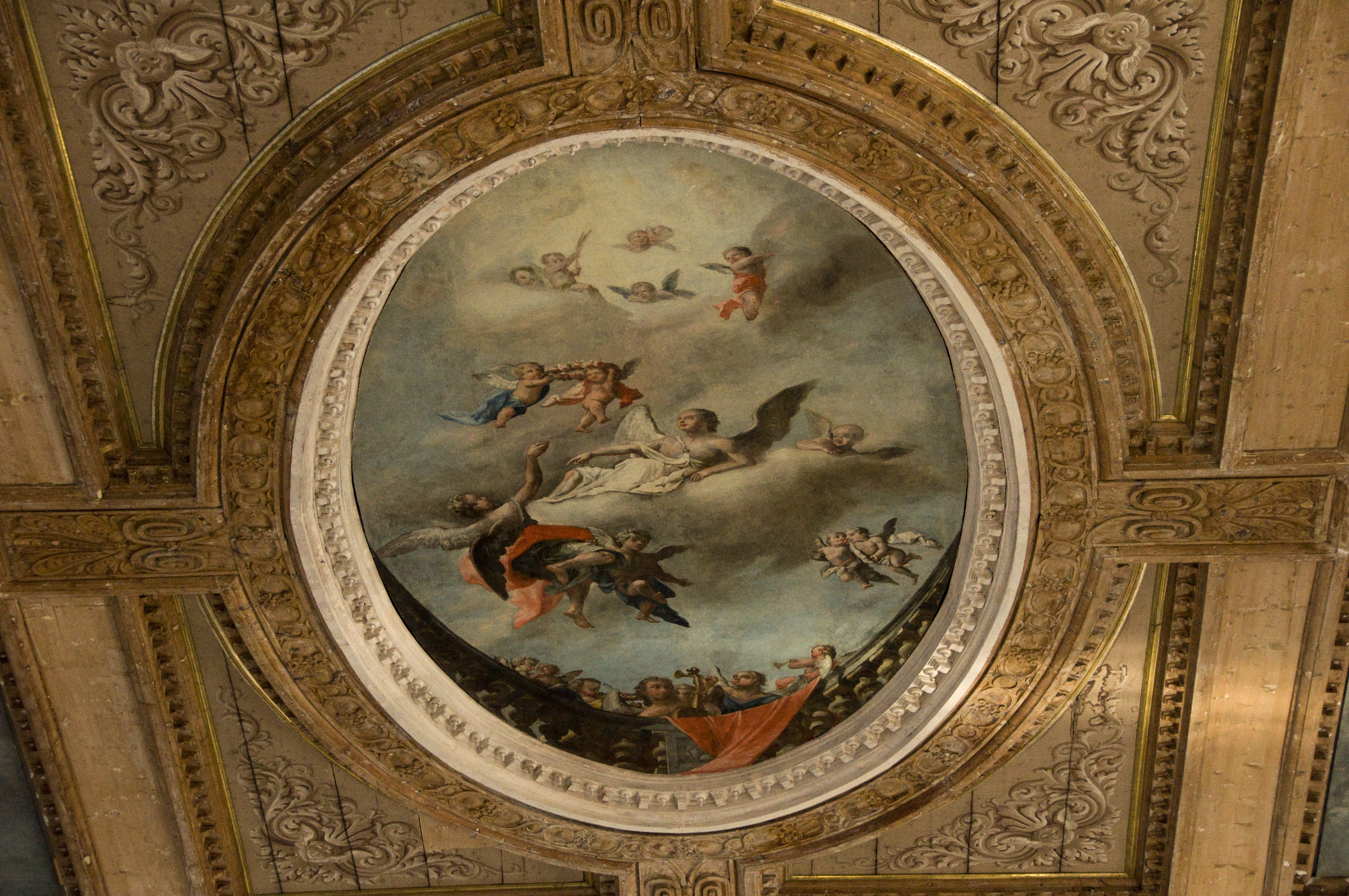
A ceiling fresco

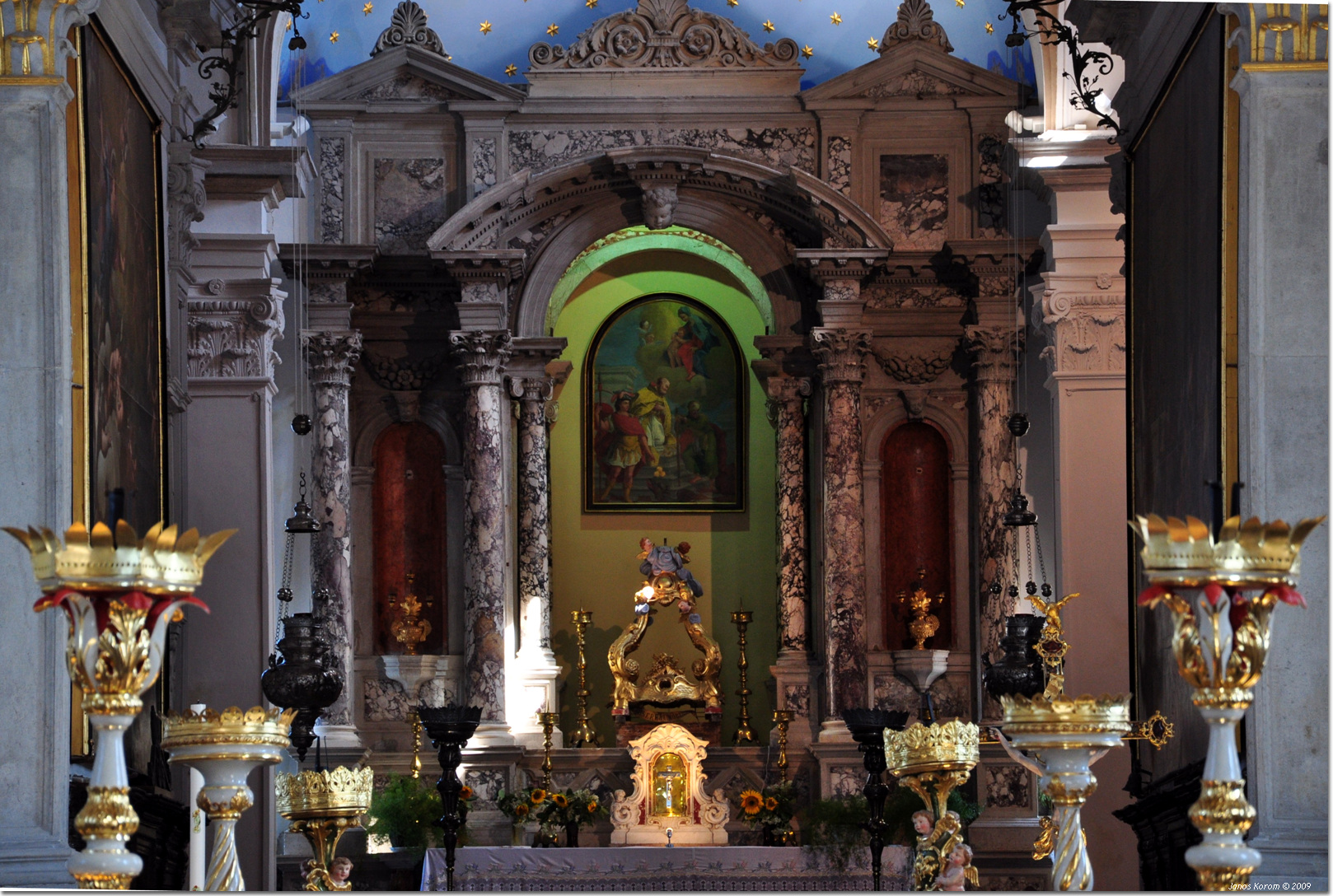
Main altar

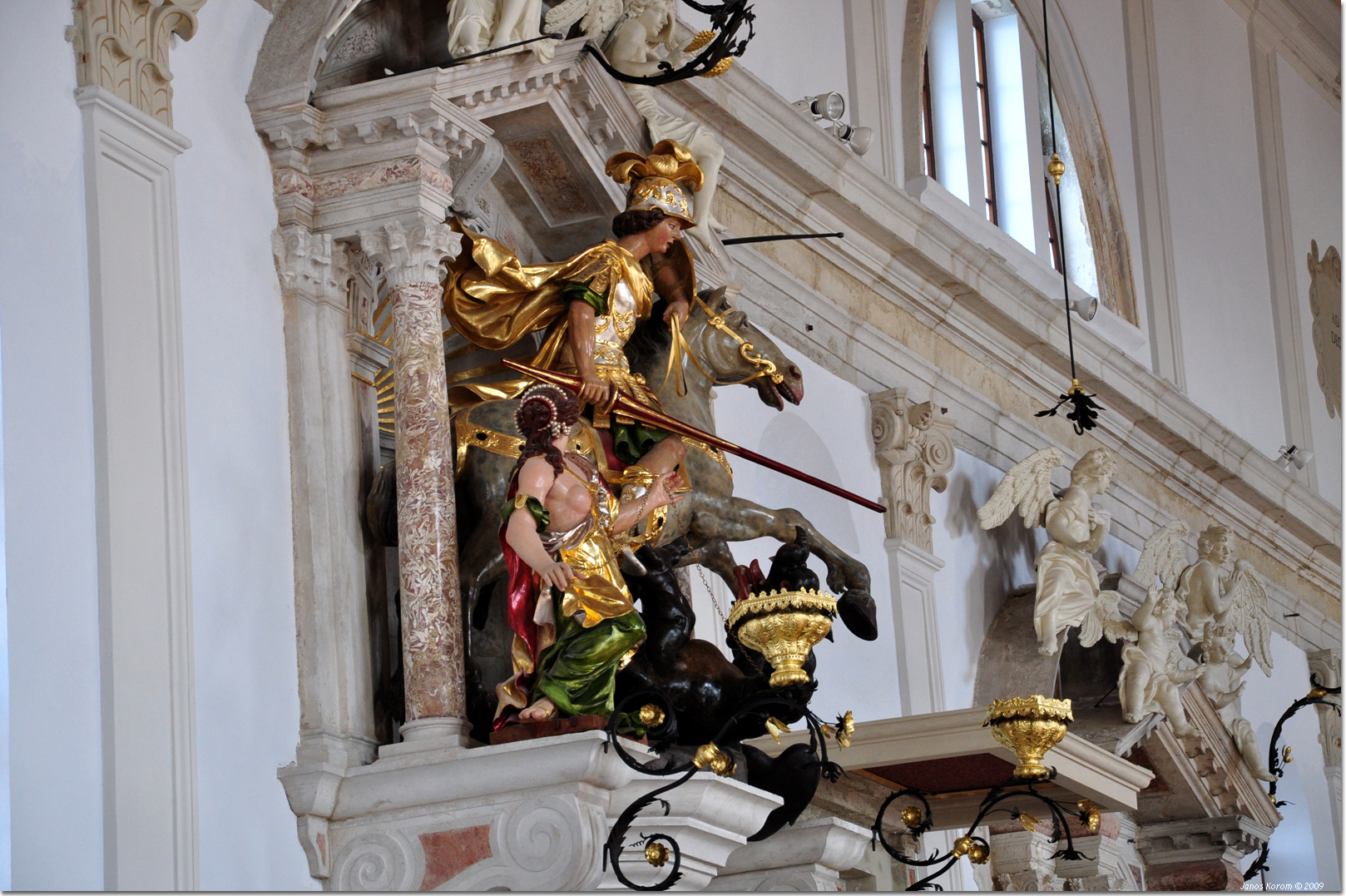
Statue of St. George (1677)

== See also ==
- List of churches under the patronage of Saint George
