= Tartini House =

Coordinates: 45°31′43.51″N 13°34′7.7″E

The Tartini House

The Tartini House (Slovene: Tartinijeva hiša) is the birthplace of Giuseppe Tartini, a violinist from Piran. The house is located on Tartini Square in the town of Piran.

== History ==
The building is one of the oldest on the square, first mentioned in 1384 as a gothic building named Casa Pizagrua. It was later renovated in neoclassical style. The most recent renovation, which took place from 1985 to 1991, revealed interesting wall paintings. The house is now the seat of the Italian community in Slovenia and is used as a venue for cultural projects, a gallery, and a museum. The museum part displays Tartini's violin, a copperplate engraving of his dreams, and his portrait, among other items.
