= Piran Minorite Monastery =

Monastery in Piran, Slovenia

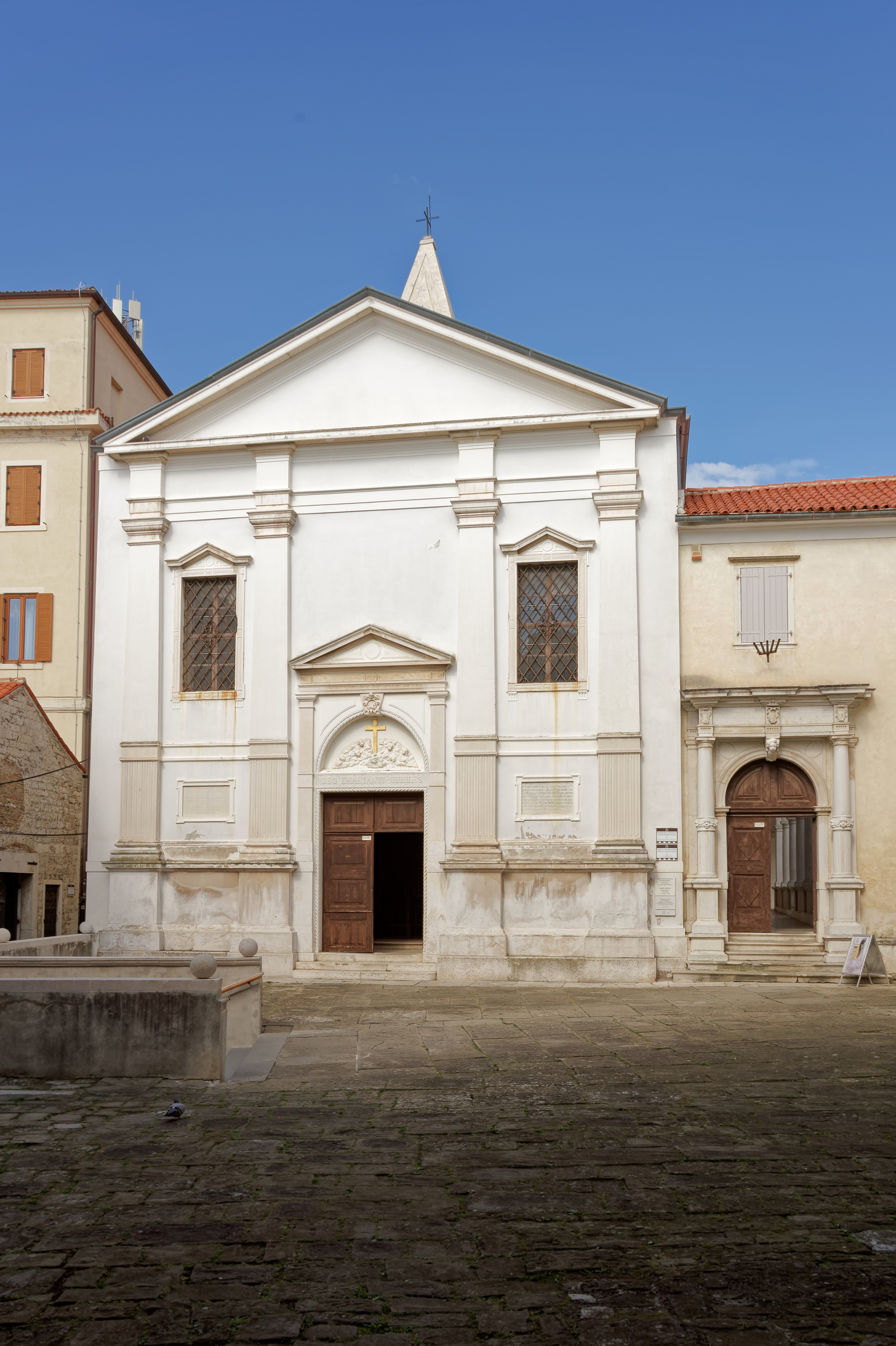

Religion
- Governing body: Order of Friars Minor Conventual

Location
- Location: Bolniška ulica Piran, Slovenia
- Interactive map of Piran Minorite Monastery
- Coordinates: 45°31′42.94″N 13°34′11.68″E

The Piran Minorite Monastery (Slovene: Minoritski samostan sv. Frančiška v Piranu) is a Roman Catholic monastery located in Piran, a historical port town on the coast of the Adriatic Sea in southwestern Slovenia. It is operated by the Order of Friars Minor Conventual.

== History ==
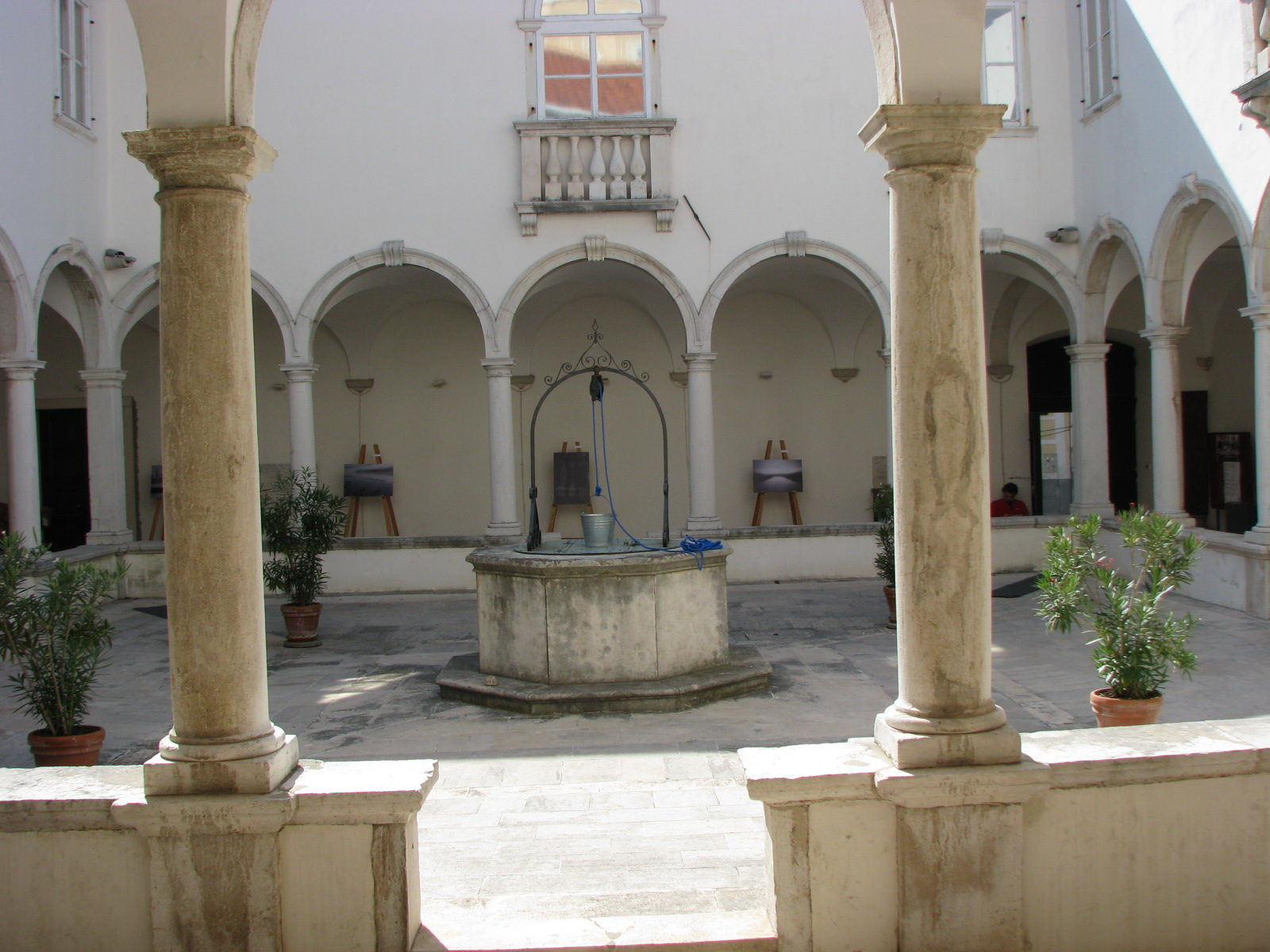
Cloister of the Piran Minorite Monastery

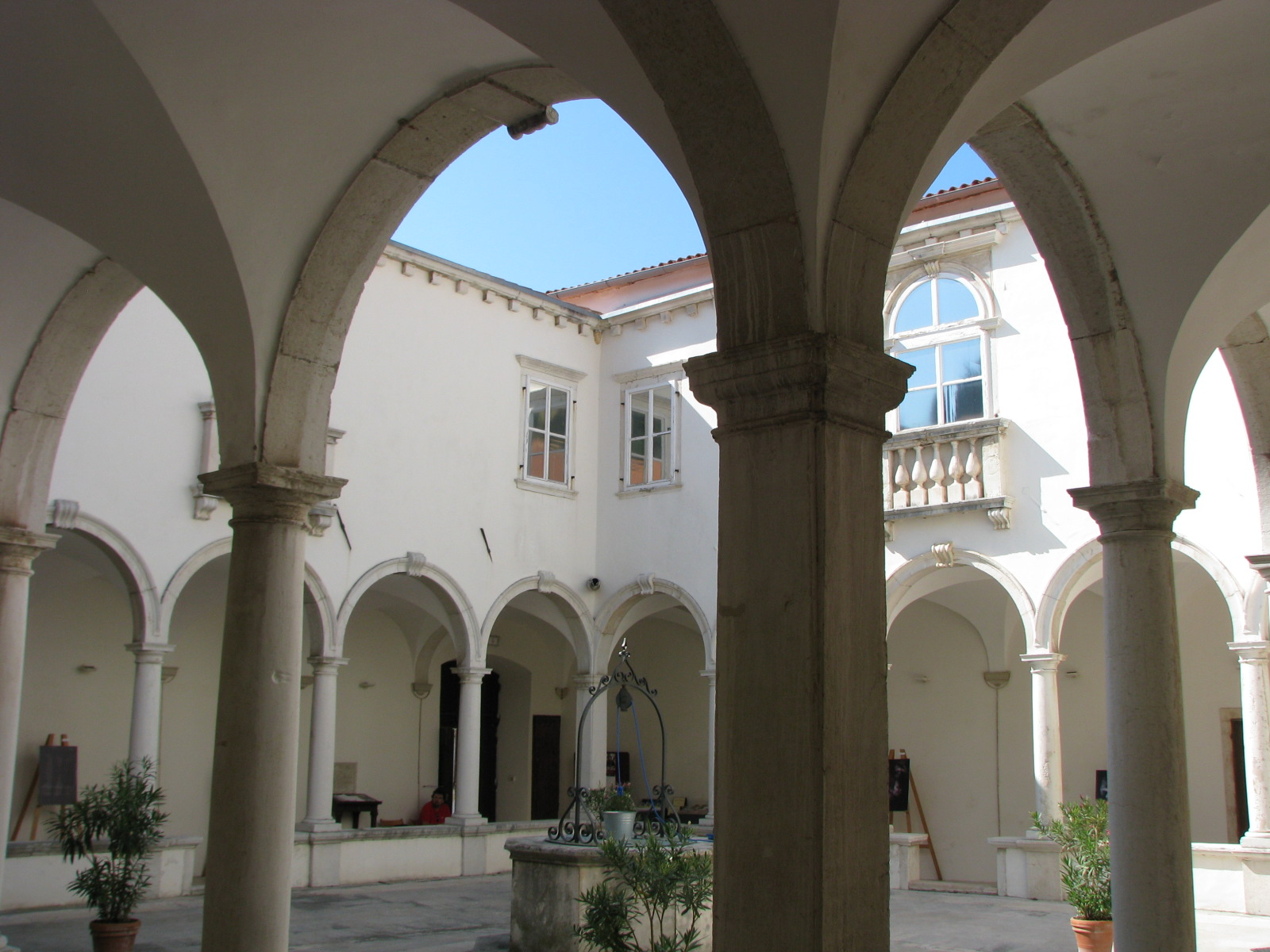
Arches of the cloister

=== Early history ===
The church of st. Catherine of Siena was already built in 1301, when a nearby monastery church of st. Francis of Assisi begun to be built by Greyfriars. Historiographers of the monastery (Trani, Granić in Frasson) wrote that Giuseppe Tartini received his first musical education in the monastery where his parents hired a room for him after 1700 A.D. From 1954 to 1990, it was nationalized and with denationalization it was given back to the church in 1996.

Minoriti so sedanjo cerkev sv. Frančiška pričeli graditi leta 1301 in jo končali leta 1318

=== Tartini family ===
At 300th anniversary of Giuseppe Tartini's birth, blueprints of old gravestones including the one belonging to Tartini's family, were found in the monastery's archives.

== Architecture ==
Leading to the cloister there is a half-arched portal adorned with richly carved columns, bearing an architrave with an inscription and coats of arms.

== Musical events ==
The atrium of the monastery has been for decades the venue for Musical Evenings of Piran events.
