= Piran =

Piran Pirano (Italian)
- Town
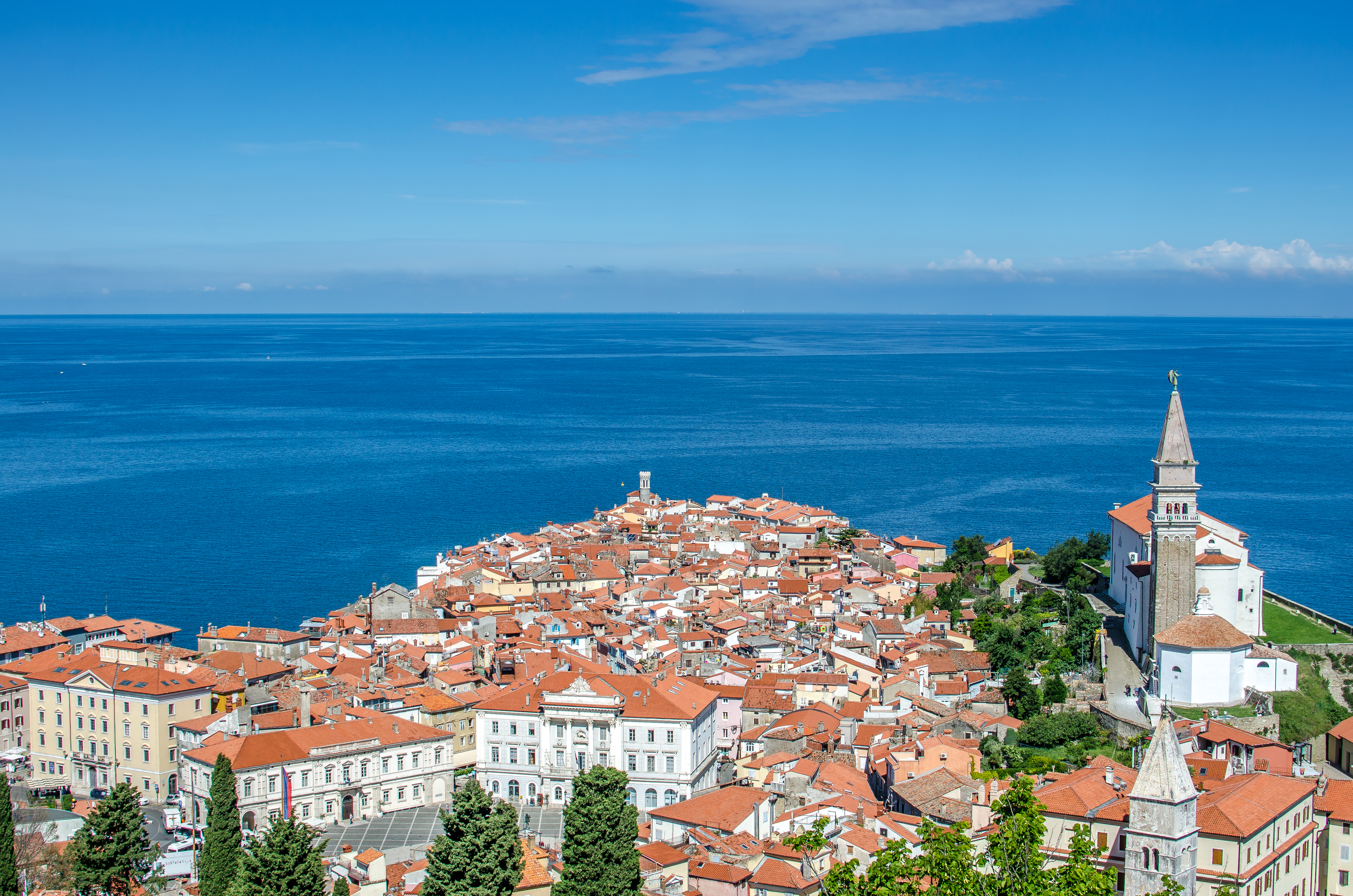
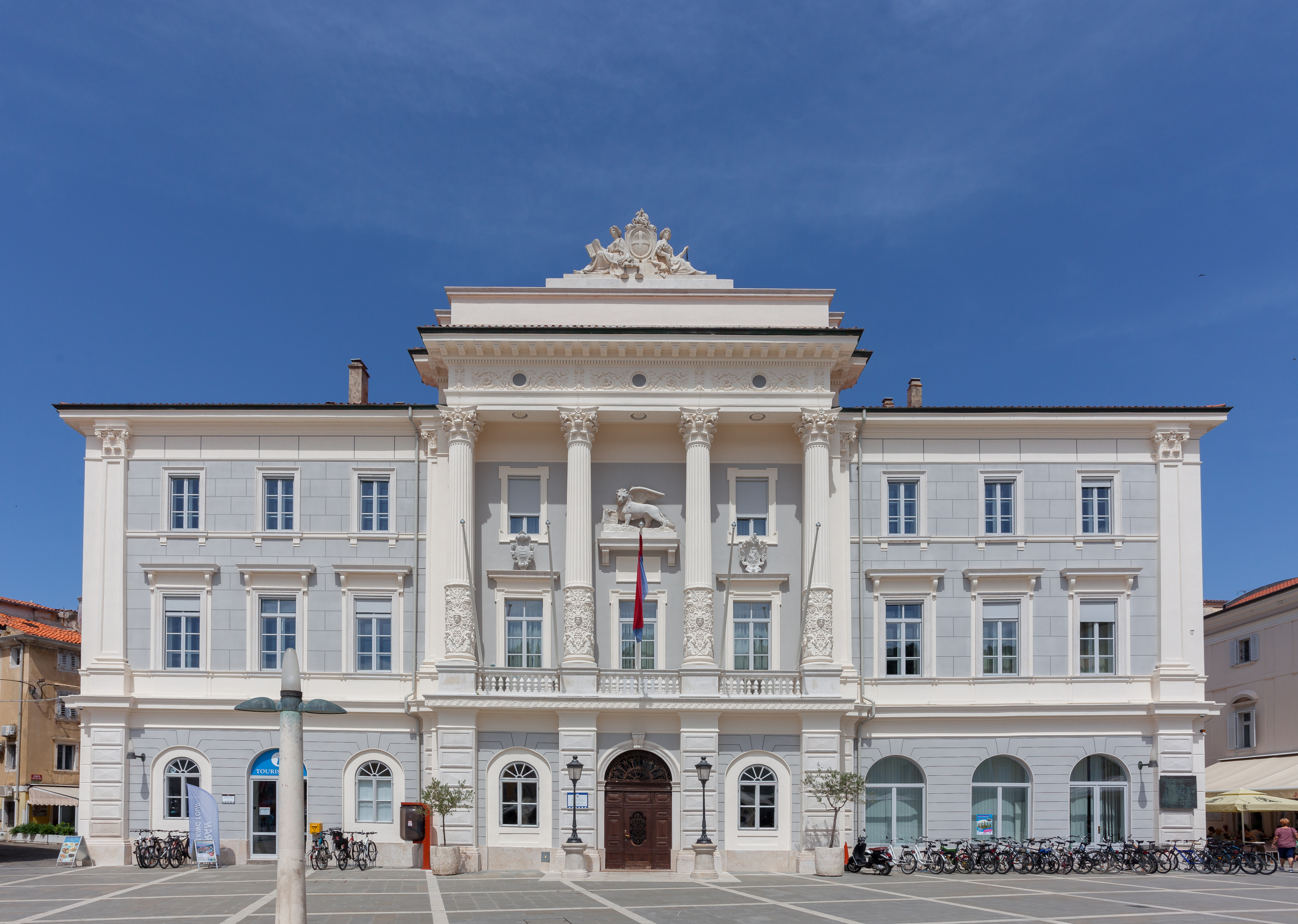
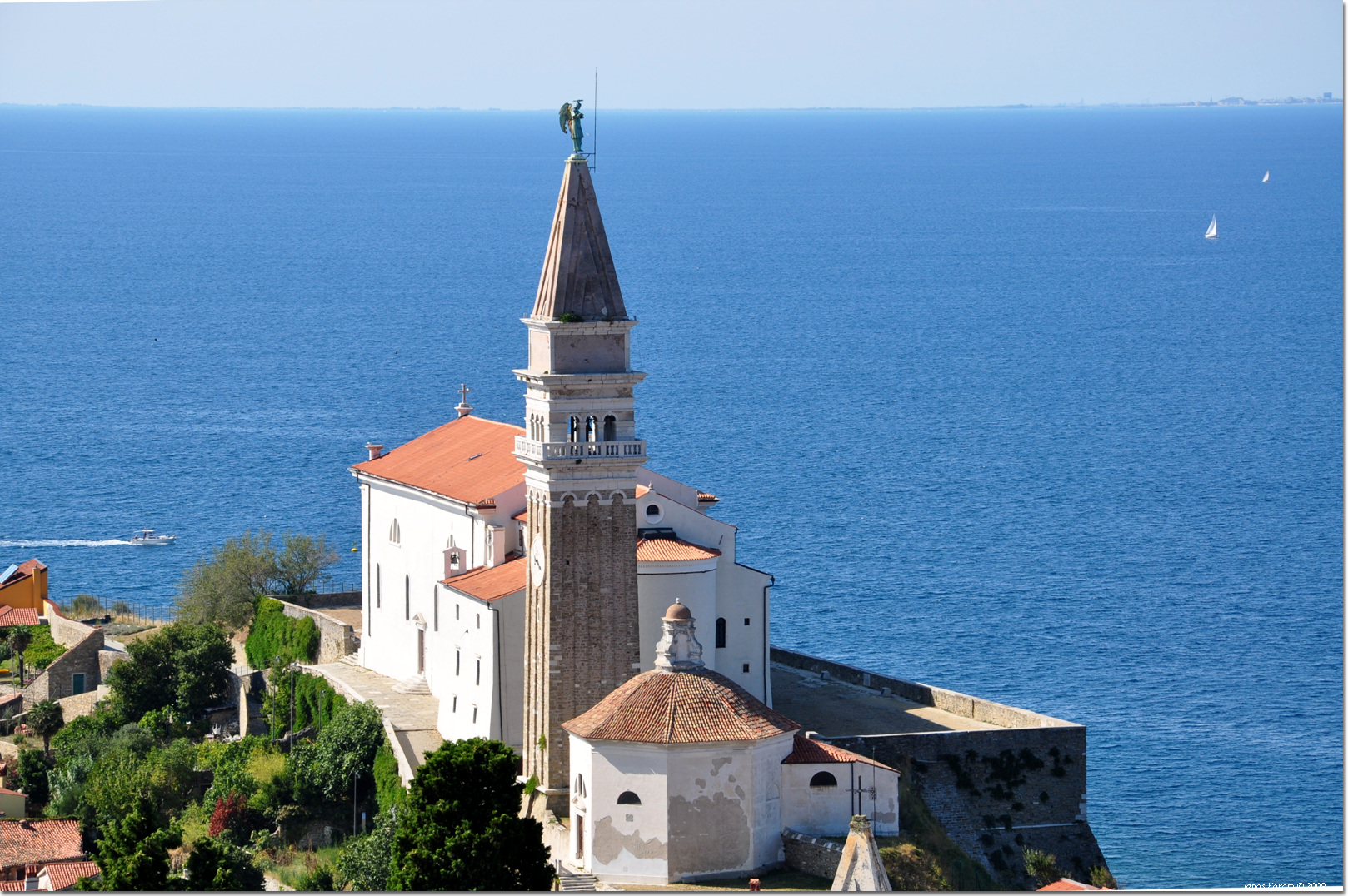
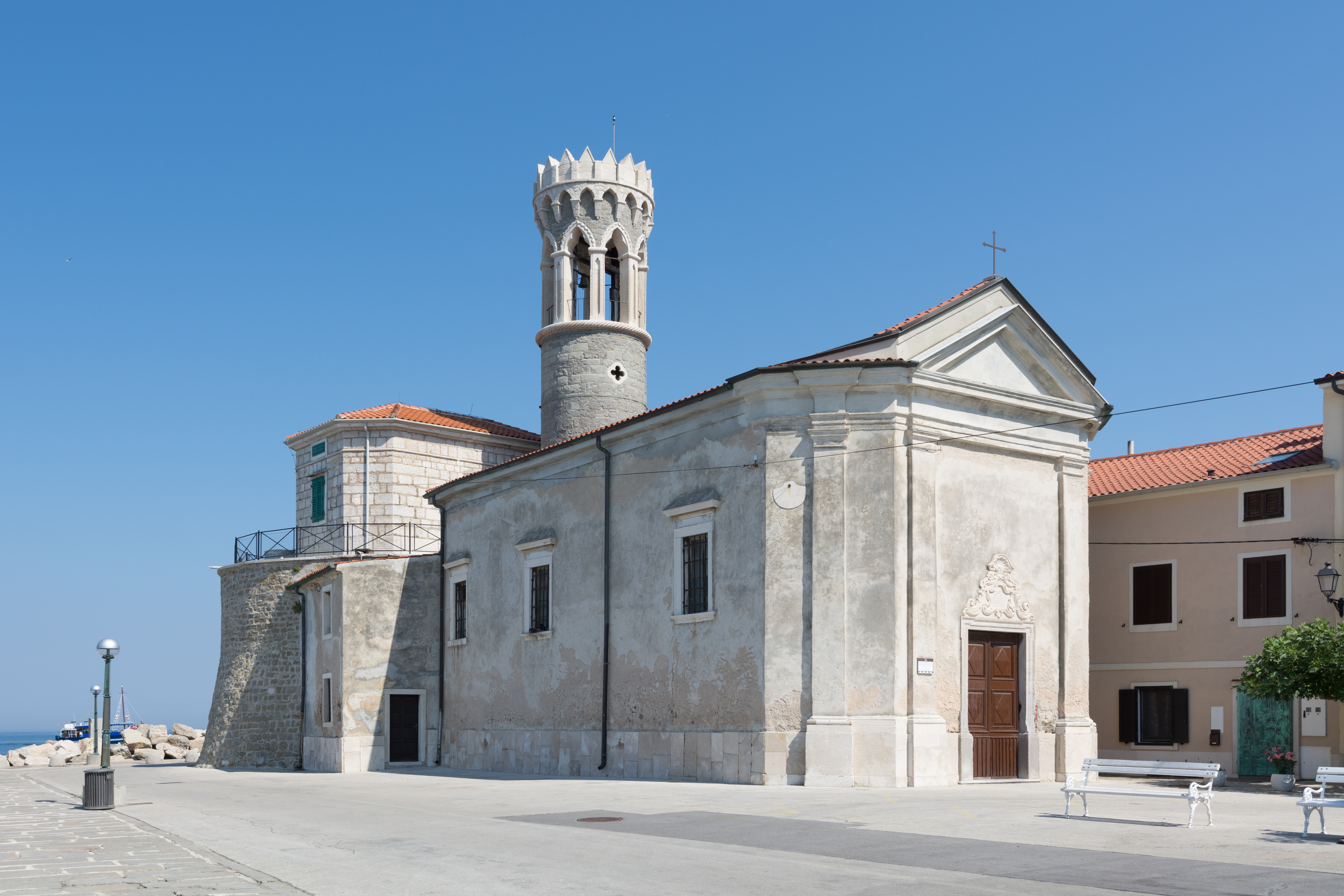
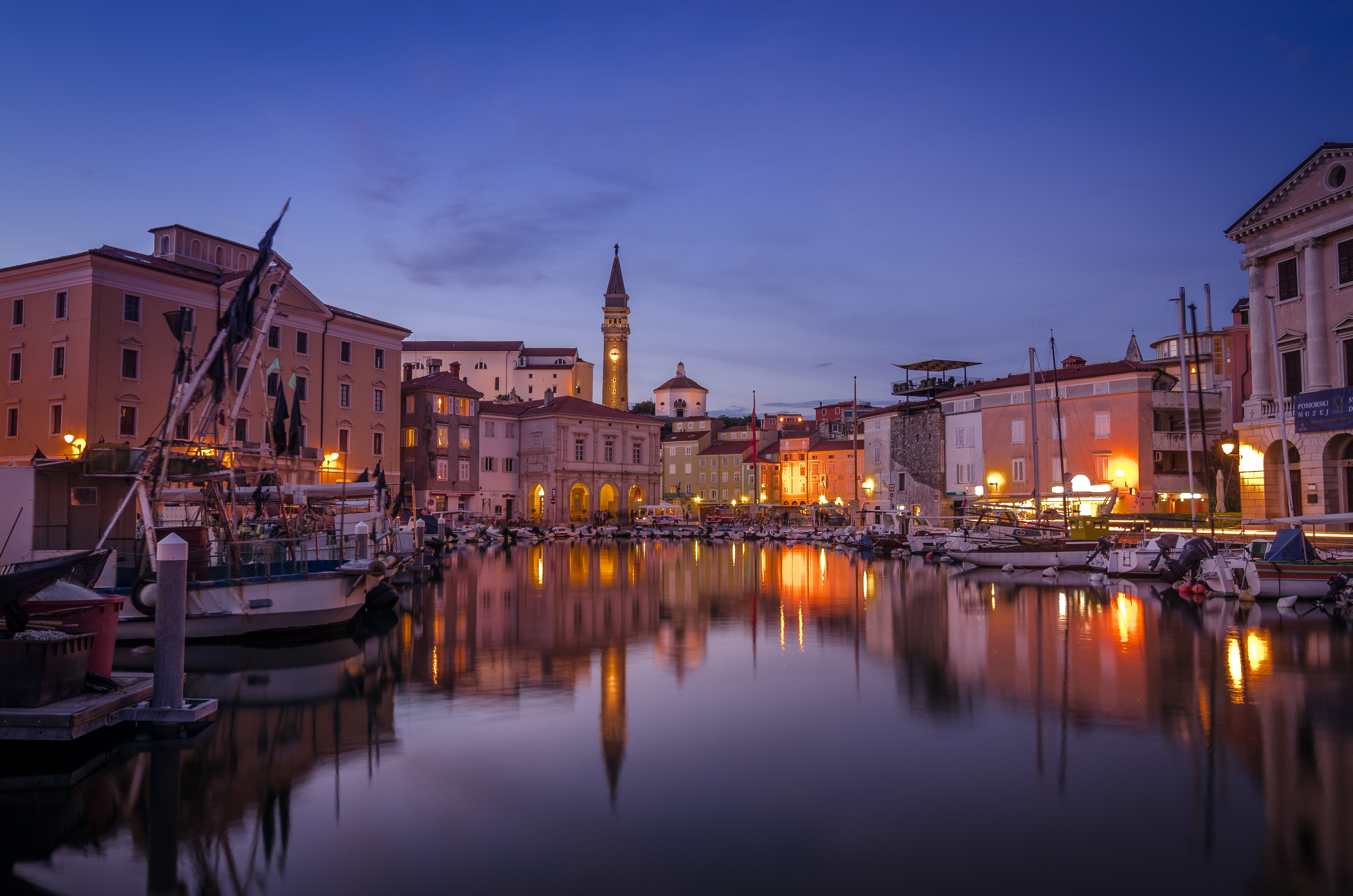
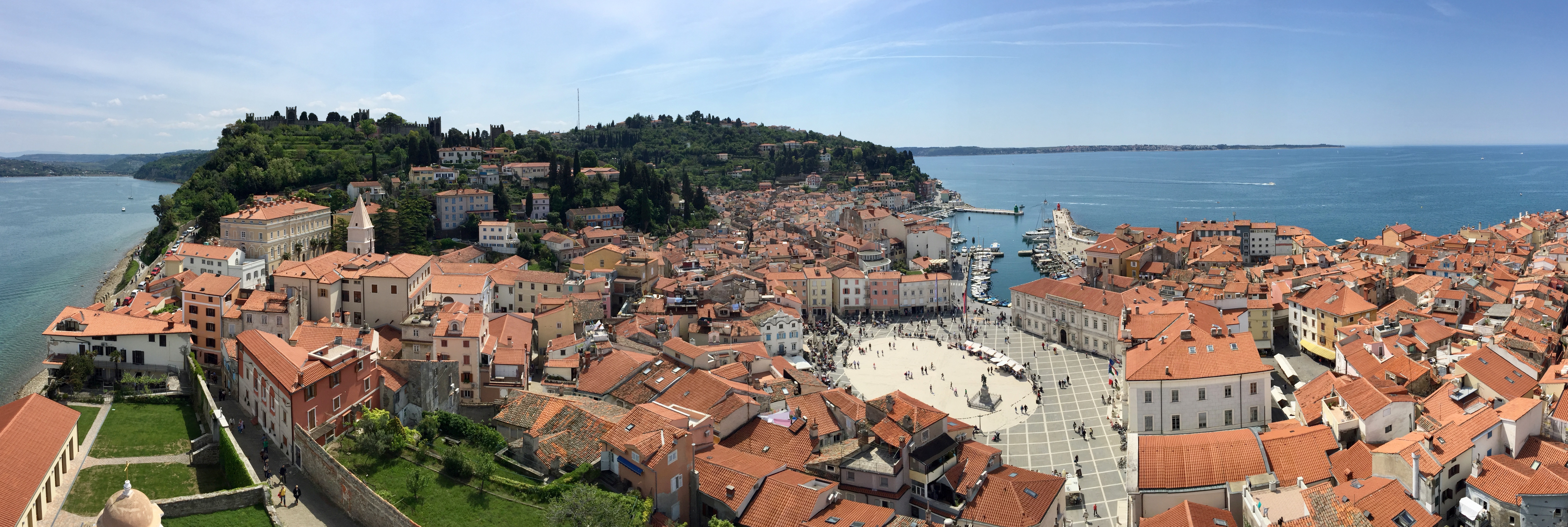
- Piran from the walls Piran Town Hall St. George's Church St. Clement's Church and Lighthouse Piran's harbour at night Town center with Tartini Square

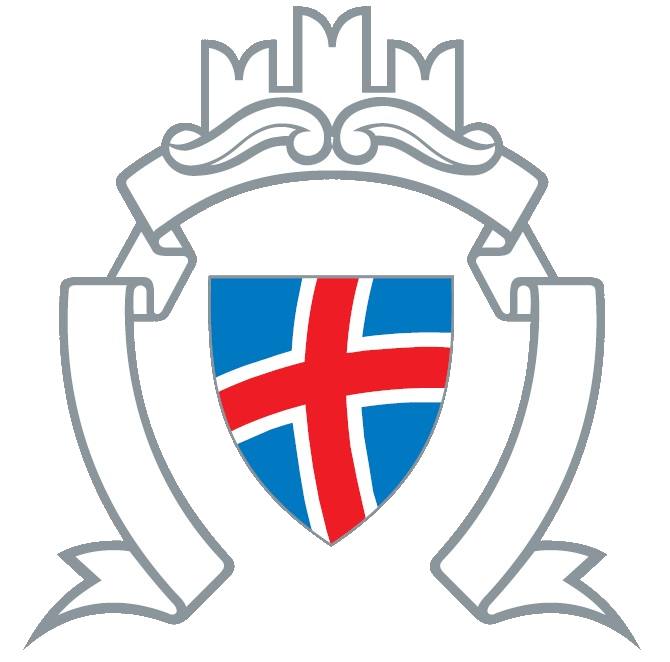
- Flag Coat of arms
- Interactive map of Piran
- Location in Slovenia
- Coordinates: 45°31′42″N 13°34′06″E
- Country: Slovenia
- Traditional region: Slovenian Littoral
- Statistical region: Coastal–Karst
- Municipality: Piran

Government
  - Mayor: Andrej Korenika (Independent)

Area
  - Total: 0.70 km^{2} (0.27 sq mi)
- Elevation: 16 m (52 ft)

Population (2019)
  - Total: 3,733
- Vehicle registration: KP

Piran (Slovene pronunciation: [piˈɾáːn]; Italian: Pirano [piˈraːno]) is a resort town in southwestern Slovenia on the Gulf of Piran on the Adriatic Sea. It is one of the three major towns of Slovenian Istria. A bilingual city, with population speaking both Slovene and Italian, Piran is known for its medieval architecture, with narrow streets and compact houses. Piran is the administrative seat of the Municipality of Piran and one of Slovenia's major tourist attractions.

== History ==
Piran by Leo von Klenze in 1831

In the pre-Roman era, the hills in the Piran area were inhabited by Illyrian Histri tribes who were farmers, hunters and fishermen. They were also pirates who disrupted Roman trade in the northern Adriatic.

The Piran peninsula was incorporated into the Roman Empire in 178 and 177 BC and settled in the following years with rural homes (villae rusticae).

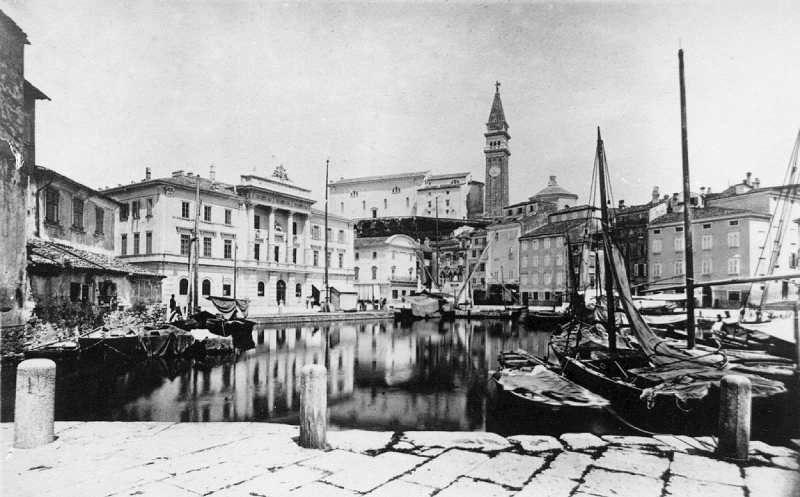
Piran before the inner marina was buried and remade into a town square

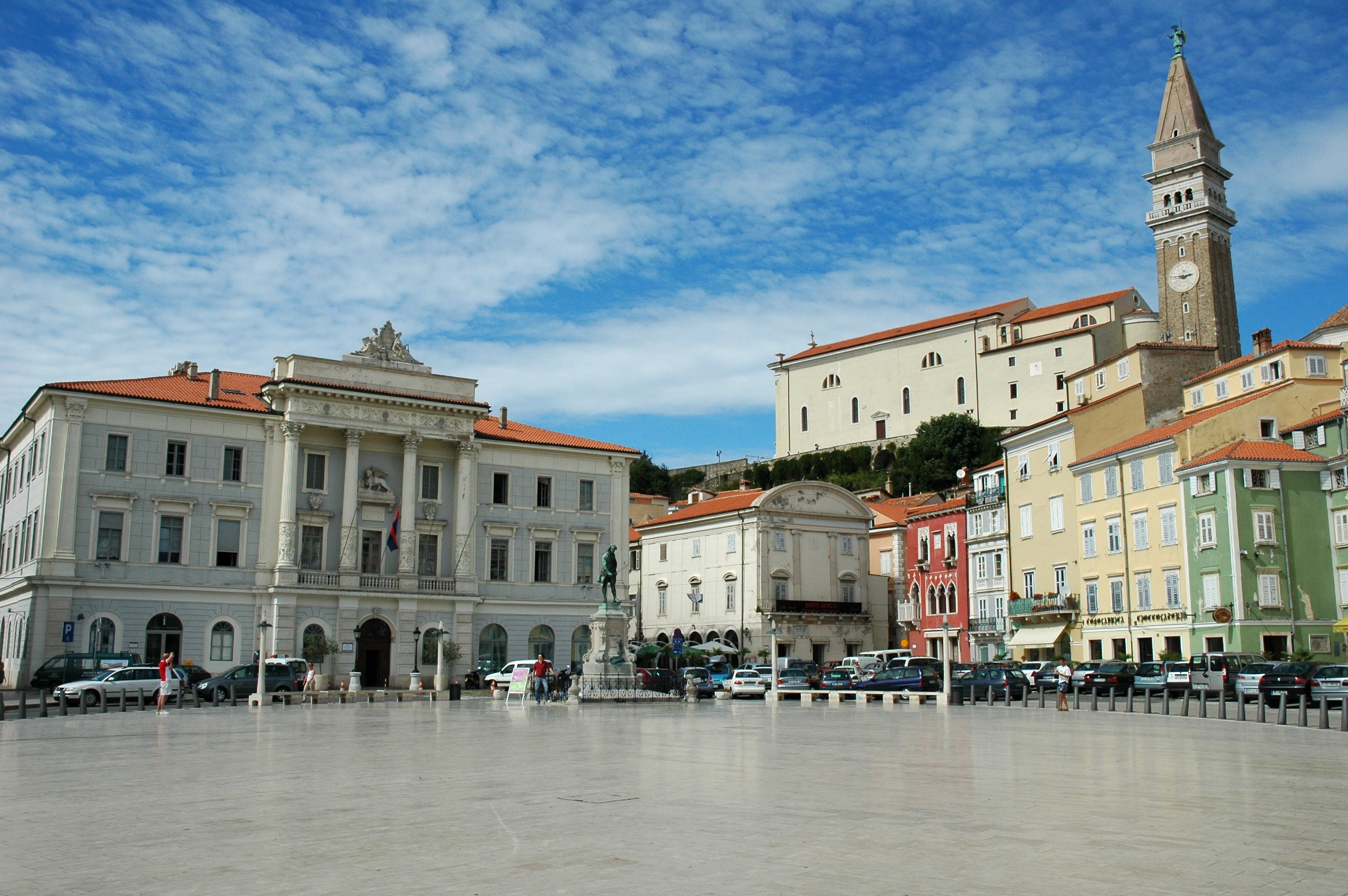
Tartini Square in 2006, when cars were still allowed to park there.

The decline of the Roman Empire, from the 5th century AD onward, and incursions by the Avars and Slavs at the end of the 6th century, prompted the Roman population to withdraw into easily defensible locations such as islands or peninsulas. This started local urbanisation and by the 7th century, under Byzantine rule, Piran had become heavily fortified. Despite the defences, the Franks conquered Istria in 788 and Slavs settled in the region. By 952, Piran had become a part of the Holy Roman Empire.

The earliest reliable records of the area are in the 7th century work Cosmographia by an anonymous cleric of Ravenna. The name of the town most probably originates from the Greek pyrrhos, which means 'red', because of the reddish flysch stones commonly found in the town's area. Some historians also refer it to pyros, meaning 'fire', due to ancient lighthouses which were supposed to be on the edge of the marina.

From 1283 to 1797, the town became part of the Republic of Venice, where it was governed in a semi-autonomous way, with a council of local noblemen assisting the Venetian delegate. Several enemy (e.g. from the Republic of Genoa) and pirate assaults were repelled during the late Middle Ages; a great pestilence hit the town in 1558, killing about two thirds of the population. The last decades of Venetian rule were marked by decadence, due to the competition with the nearby Austrian port town of Trieste.

Historical population
Year	Pop.	±%
1948	5,452	—
1953	3,574	−34.4%
1961	5,474	+53.2%
1971	5,483	+0.2%
1981	5,113	−6.7%
1991	4,820	−5.7%
2002	4,143	−14.0%
2011	4,192	+1.2%
2021	3,827	−8.7%
Population size may be affected by changes in administrative divisions.

The town was annexed to the Austrian Empire in 1797; but during the years from 1806 to 1814, it was ceded to the Napoleonic Empire. On 22 February 1812, the Battle of Pirano was fought between a British and a French ship of the line in the vicinity of Piran. This was a minor battle of the Adriatic campaign of the Napoleonic Wars.

At the end of the 19th century and the beginning of the 20th century, Piran was an Austro-Hungarian town with over 15,000 inhabitants, roughly the same size as nearby Koper. Around 80% of the population was ethnically and culturally Italian, with a Slovene minority of around 15%. It was a flourishing market and spa town with good transport connections. The first trolleybus line in the Balkans was introduced to public service on 24 October 1909 in Piran. In 1912, it was replaced by a tramway that operated on the same route till 1953.

After the First World War, together with Trieste and all Istria, the town was ceded to Italy. There were no particular events in those years, until Italy entered the Second World War in 1940. With the defeat of the Axis powers and the rise of Tito's rule, Piran was assigned to the Free Territory of Trieste, Zone B, under Yugoslavian administration, changing the official name in "Piran". The town was annexed to Yugoslavia in 1954, according to the London Memorandum signed together with Italy. A significant part of Piran's population chose to emigrate to Italy or abroad in the final phase of the Istrian–Dalmatian exodus, rather than stay in socialist Yugoslavia. The annexation to Yugoslavia was finally ratified with the Osimo Treaty in 1975, with the municipality becoming part of the Socialist Republic of Slovenia. Until the mid-20th century, Italian was the dominant language, but it was replaced by Slovene following the Istrian exodus. Since 1991, Piran has been part of independent Slovenia.

On 24 October 2010, Slovenia became the first country of former communist Europe to elect a black mayor. The physician Peter Bossman, who came from Ghana in the late 1970s, was elected the Mayor of Piran. He officially took office at the first constitutional meeting of the Municipal Council on 12 November 2010, succeeding Tomaž Gantar. He represents the Social Democrats.

The territorial claims of Croatia and Slovenia in the Gulf of Piran remain an important matter of debate in the Croatia–Slovenia border disputes that began after the dissolution of Yugoslavia.

== Culture and education ==
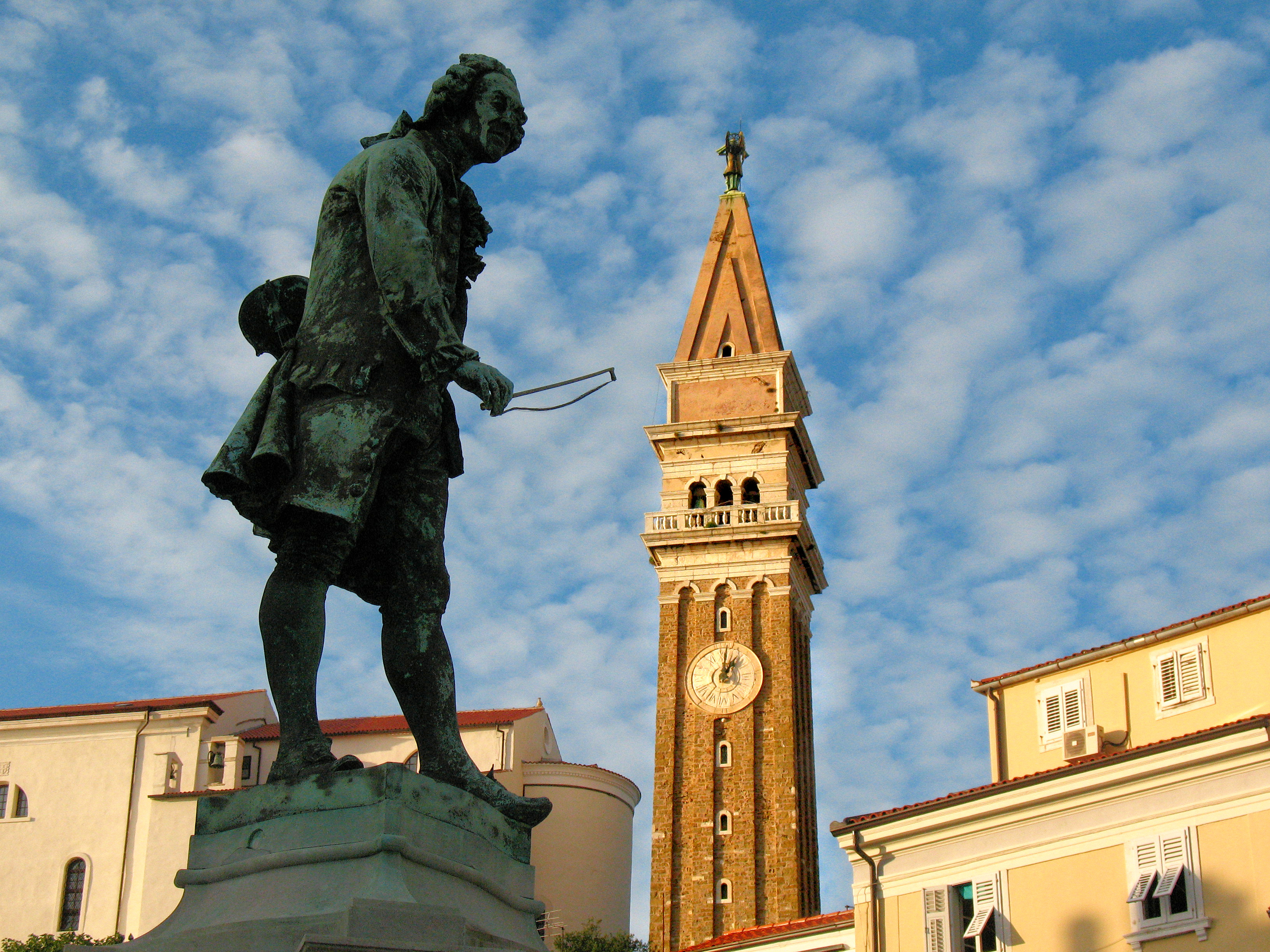
Giuseppe Tartini's statue of the sculptor with St. George's Cathedral in the background

Piran is the birthplace of the Italian composer and violinist Giuseppe Tartini, who played an important role in shaping its cultural heritage. The town's main square, Tartini Square (Slovene: Tartinijev trg, Italian: Piazza Tartini), is named after him. In 1892, the 200th anniversary of his birth, a monument to Tartini was erected in Piran. Venetian artist Antonio Dal Zotto was commissioned to create a larger-than-life bronze statue, which was mounted on its pedestal in 1896. The statue dominates the square, overlooked by the Cathedral of Saint George. The painter Cesare Dell'Acqua was also born in Piran.

The Piran Coastal Galleries, a public institution encompassing a group of six public contemporary art galleries, is based in Piran.

=== Cultural events ===
Musical evenings have taken place for decades in the Greyfriars Franciscan monastery's atrium, one of the cloister atriums in the Slovenian Littoral.

The municipality's festival is 15 October, which celebrates the foundation of the first Slovenian partisan naval detachment, named Koper, in 1944.

== Geography and climate ==
Piran is located at the tip of the Piran peninsula, part of the Gulf of Trieste.

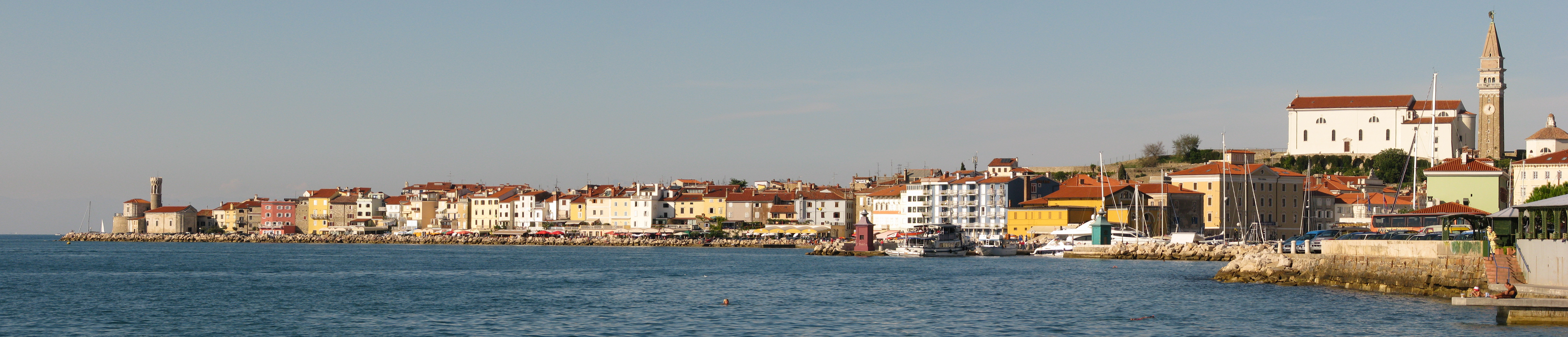

To the east of the town, along the northern coastline (in the direction to Strunjan) there is a small tourist settlement named Fiesa. Piran and Fiesa are connected by a promenade along the beach. Piran has a humid subtropical climate with warm summers and cool rainy winters. Snow is rare (usually 3 days per year, almost always in traces). There are 22 days a year with maximum temperatures of 30 °C (86 °F) or higher; on one day a year the temperature does not exceed 0 °C (32 °F). Fog appears about 4 days per year, mainly in winter.

== Demographics ==
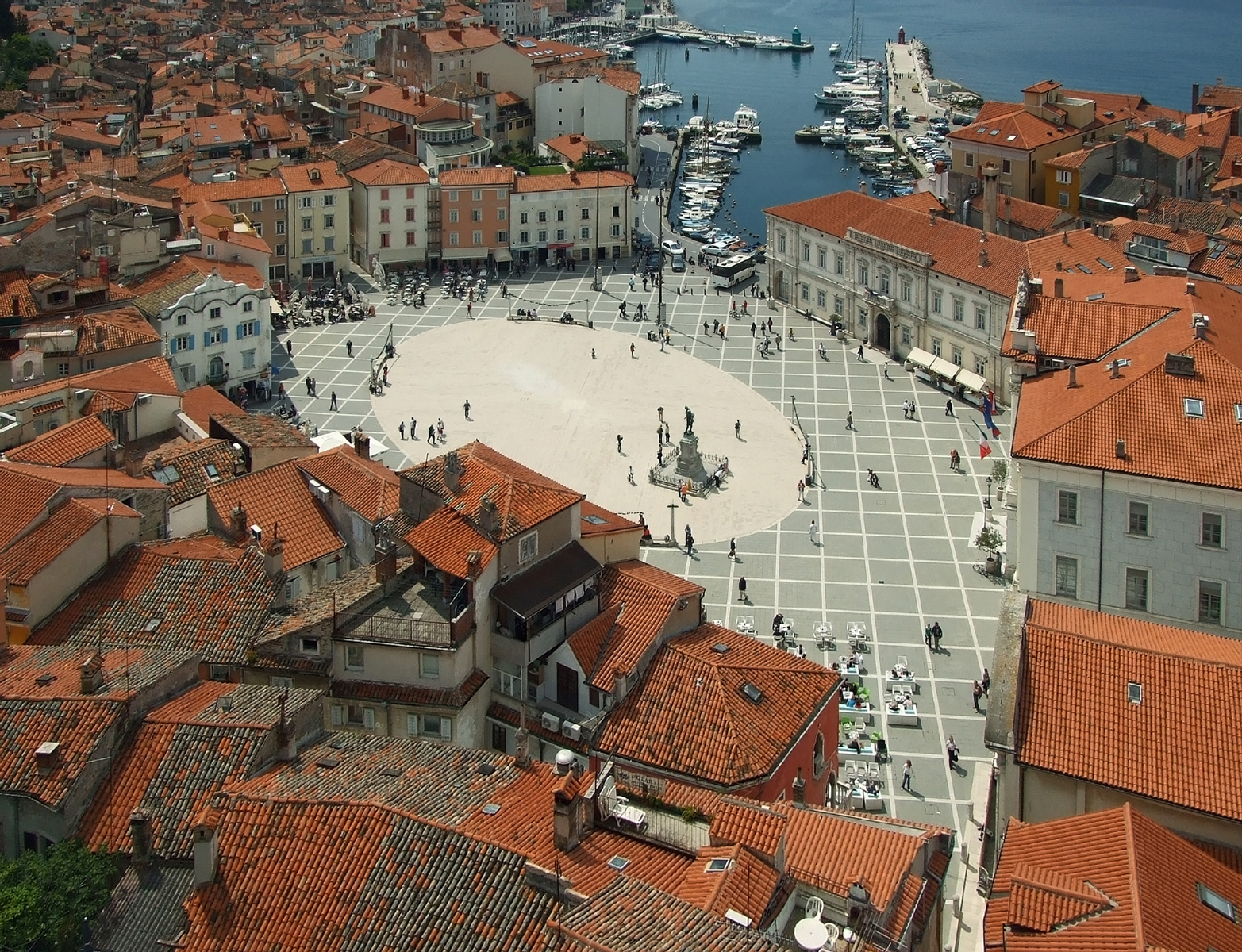
Tartini Square

According to the Austrian language census of 1910, there were 7,379 inhabitants in the town proper, 95.97% Italians and 0.09% Slovenes. In 1945, the town proper had 5,035 inhabitants, 91.32% Italian and 8.54% Slovene speakers. After World War II, when Piran became a part of Yugoslavia, there was an exodus of the Italian-speakers from the region. They were replaced by Slovene settlers, both from other areas of Slovenian Istria and from interior areas of the country. In 1956 there were 3,574 inhabitants, 67.6% Slovene and 15.5% Italian.

== Monuments ==
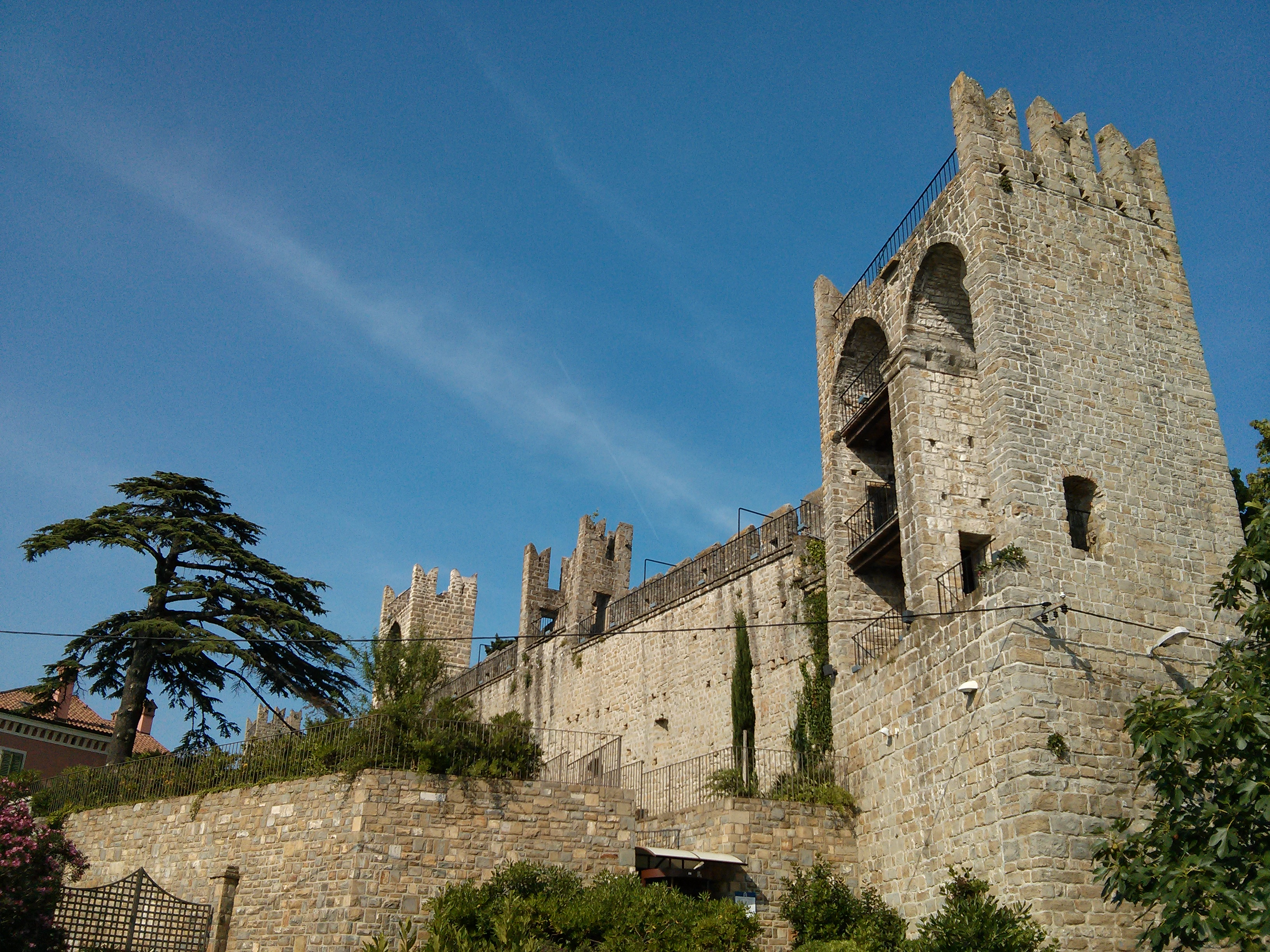
Piran town wall

Piran was heavily influenced by the Venetian Republic and Austria-Hungary, therefore the monuments differ greatly from those in inner parts of Slovenia. The Piran town walls were constructed to protect the town from Ottoman incursions; many parts of the town walls from different eras remain, and are of interest to tourists. In the middle of the town is the Tartini Square, with a monument in memory of Giuseppe Tartini. Nearby are located various important buildings, such as Tartini’s house, first mentioned in 1384 and one of the oldest in town, the Municipal Palace, Loggia and Benečanka, among others. On the hill above the town is the biggest and most important church, the Saint George's Church, with a Franciscan monastery nearby.

== Communications and transport ==
There is an international airport and a marina in the vicinity of the town. The AM transmitter of Radio Koper is in Piran. It transmits on 1170 kHz and has a 123.6-metre-tall guyed mast with cage antenna. The town is connected with Koper, Izola, Portorož (the location of the airport), Sečovlje and Lucija by a cheap bus line. The lines of other coastal settlements operate mostly during the tourist season.

The first trolleybus line in Slovenia entered public service on 24 October 1909 in Piran, then part of Austria-Hungary. It ran from Tartini Square along the coast and the shipyard to Portorož and Lucija. The town authorities bought five trolleybuses manufactured by Austrian company Daimler-Motoren-Gesellschaft. In 1912, it was replaced by a tram system that operated until 1953, when it was superseded by buses.

== Sports ==
Pod Obzidjem Stadium (Slovene: Stadion pod obzidjem) is a multi-purpose stadium in Piran. It is used for football matches and is the home ground of football team NK Portorož Piran. The stadium currently holds 750 spectators, 500 of them can be seated.

== International relations ==
=== Twin towns and sister cities ===
Piran is twinned with:

- Vis, Croatia (since 1973)
- Aquileia, Italy (since 1977)
- Ohrid, North Macedonia (since 1981)
- Bjugn, Norway (since 1985)
- Castel Goffredo, Italy (since 1993)
- Indianapolis, Indiana, United States (since 2001)
- Valletta, Malta (since 2002)
- Acqualagna, Italy (since 2003)
- Mangalia, Romania (since 2012)
- Porano, Italy (since 2012)
- Karsiyaka, Turkey (since 2013)
- Sittersdorf, Austria (since 2017)
- Tivat, Montenegro (since 2018)

== Gallery ==
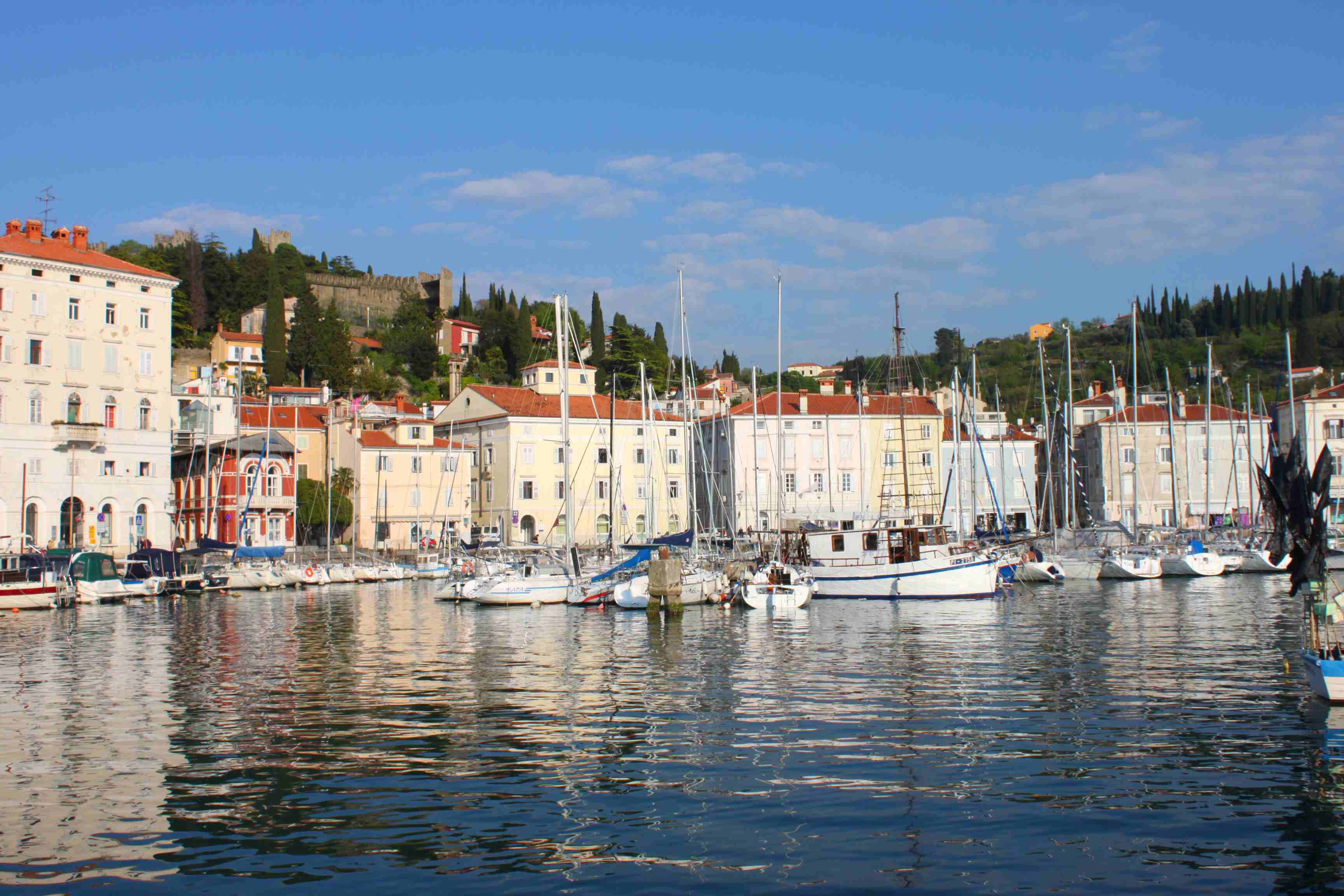
Piran's harbour

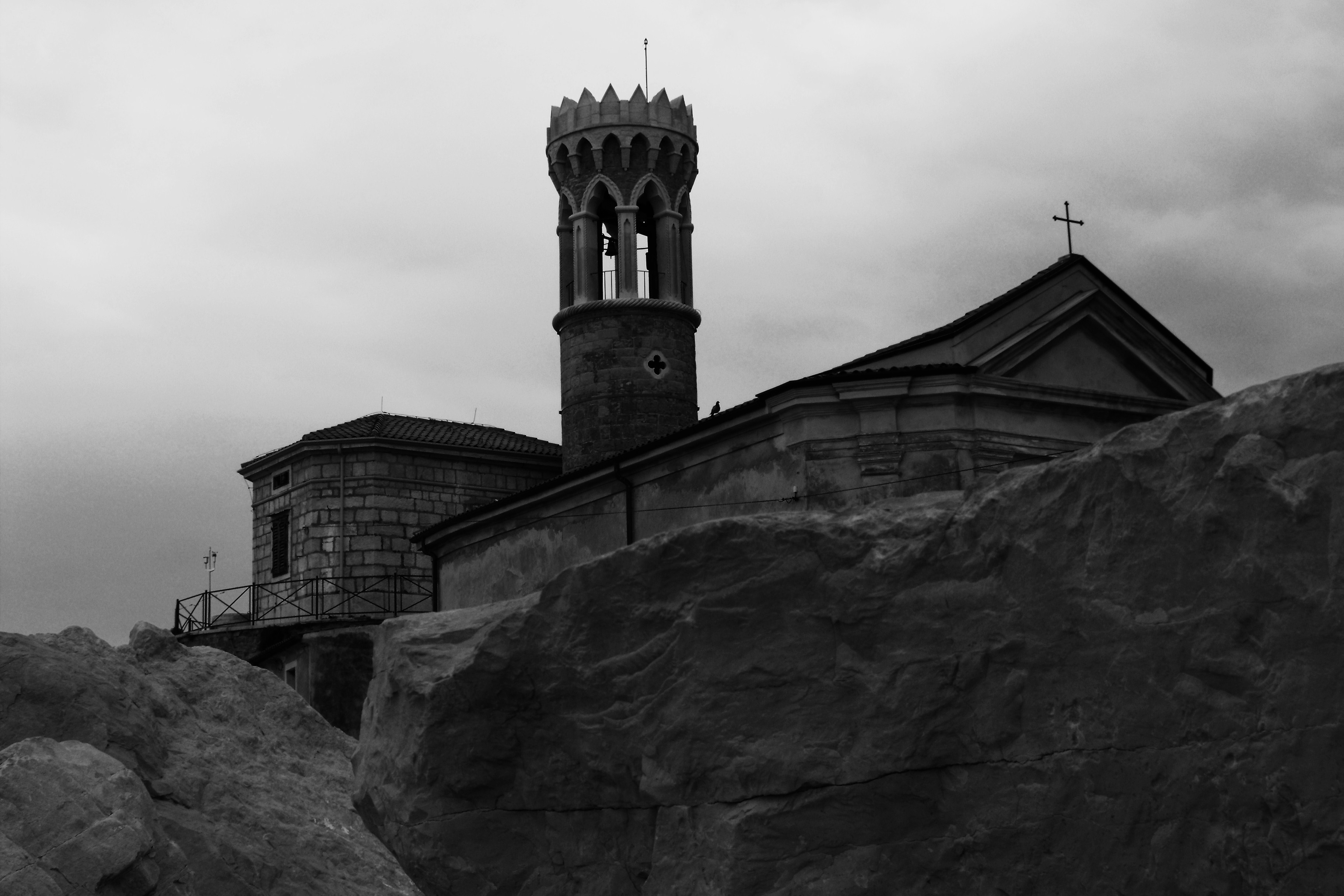
Piran's lighthouse

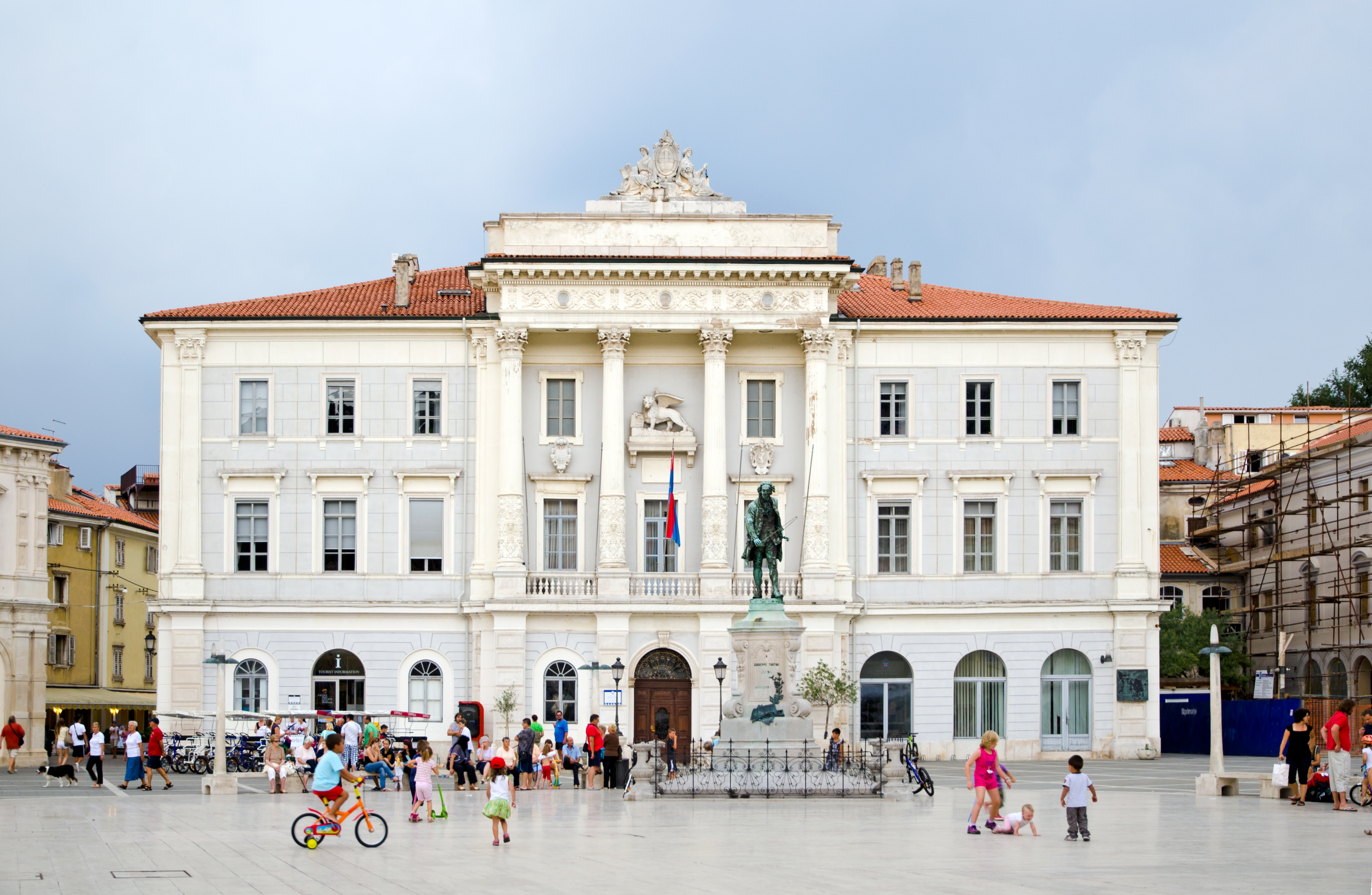
Piran's town hall on Tartini Square

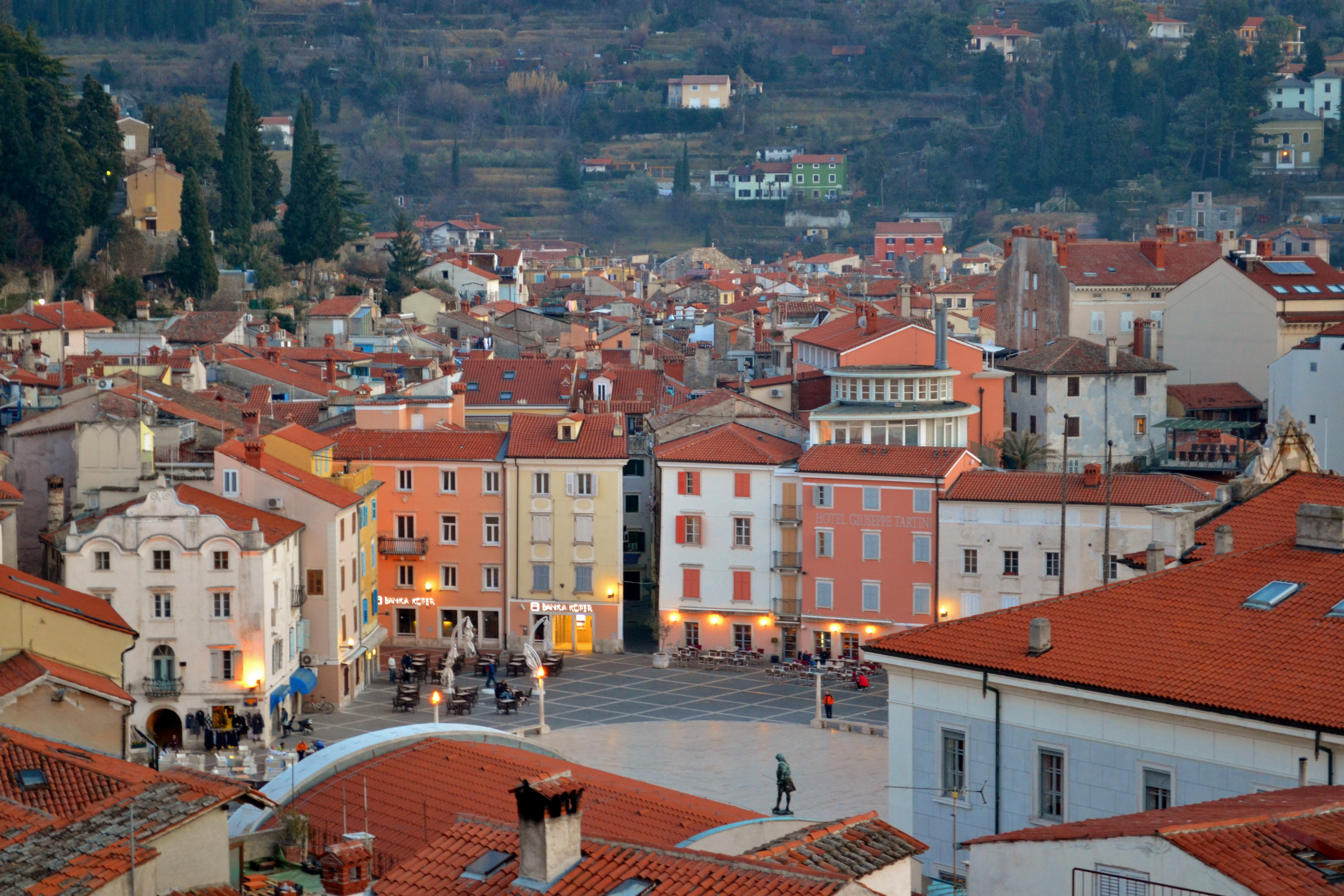
Panoramic view of Tartini Square

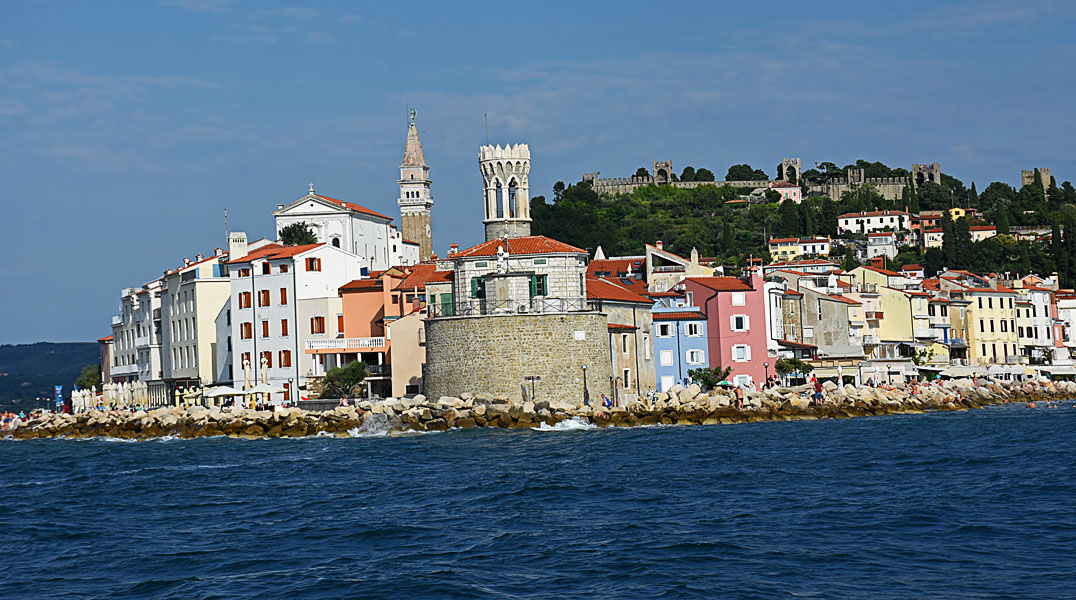
Cape Madonna, the westernmost tip of the peninsula

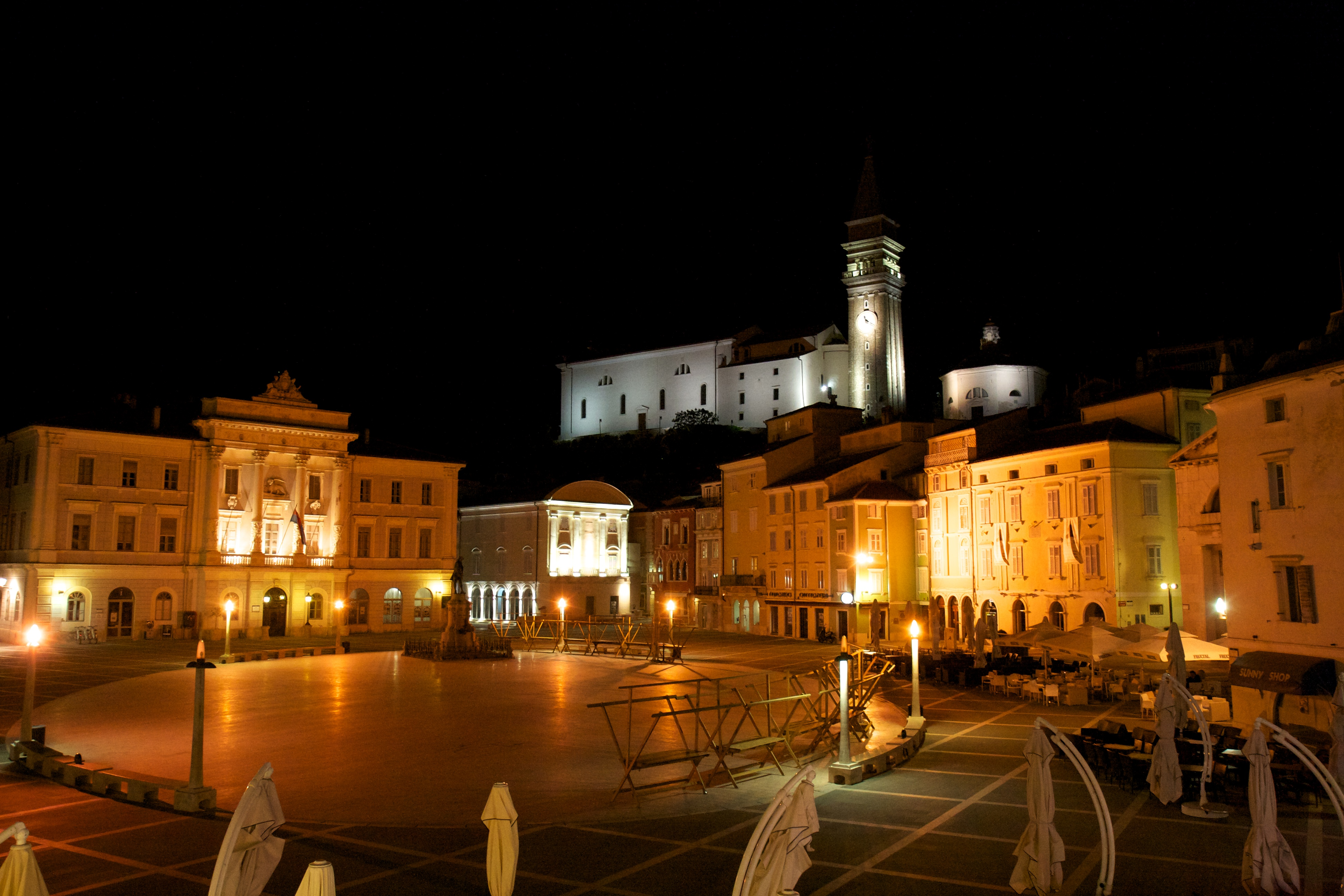
Tartini Square at night

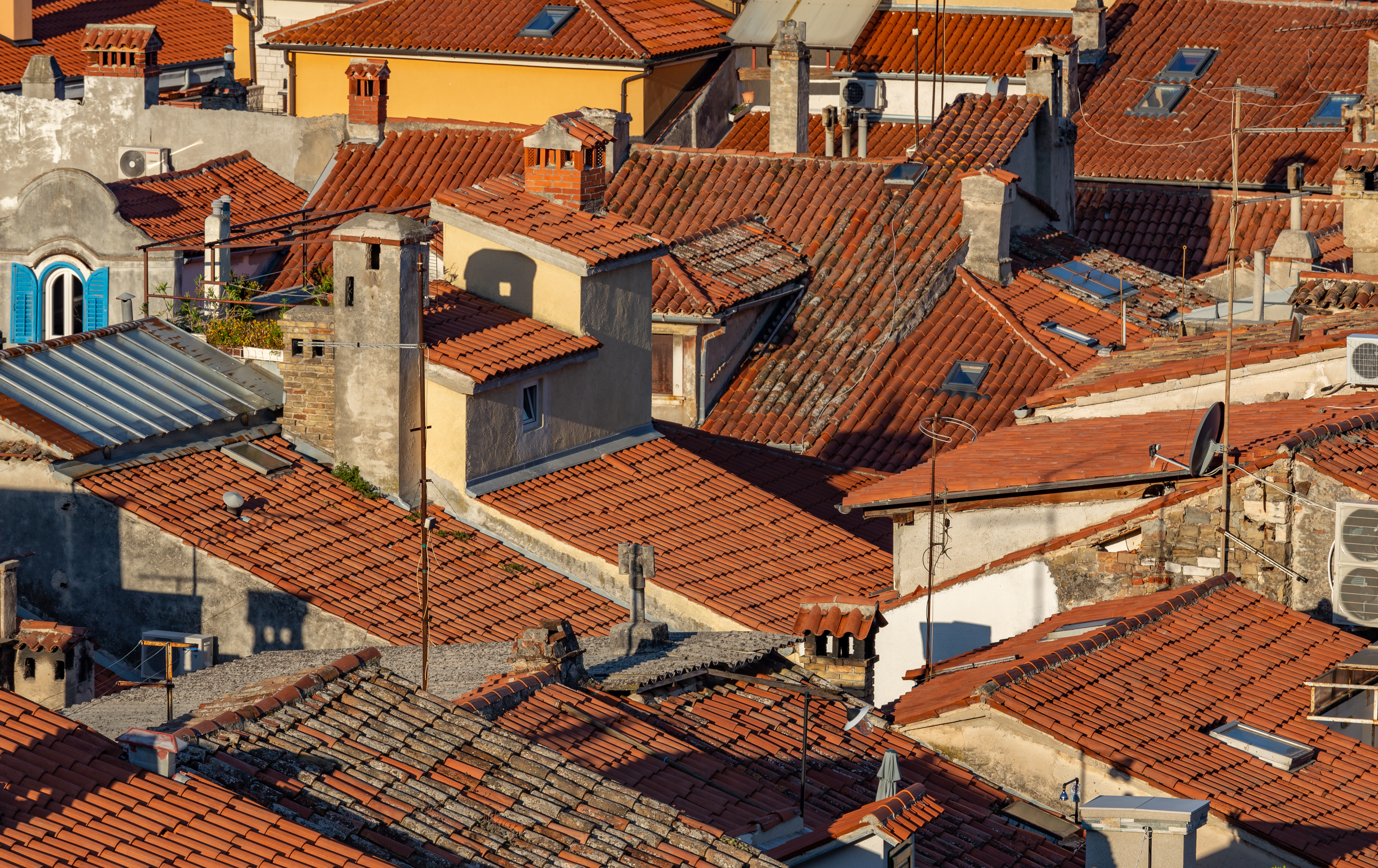
Red roofs of Piran seen from St. George's Cathedral

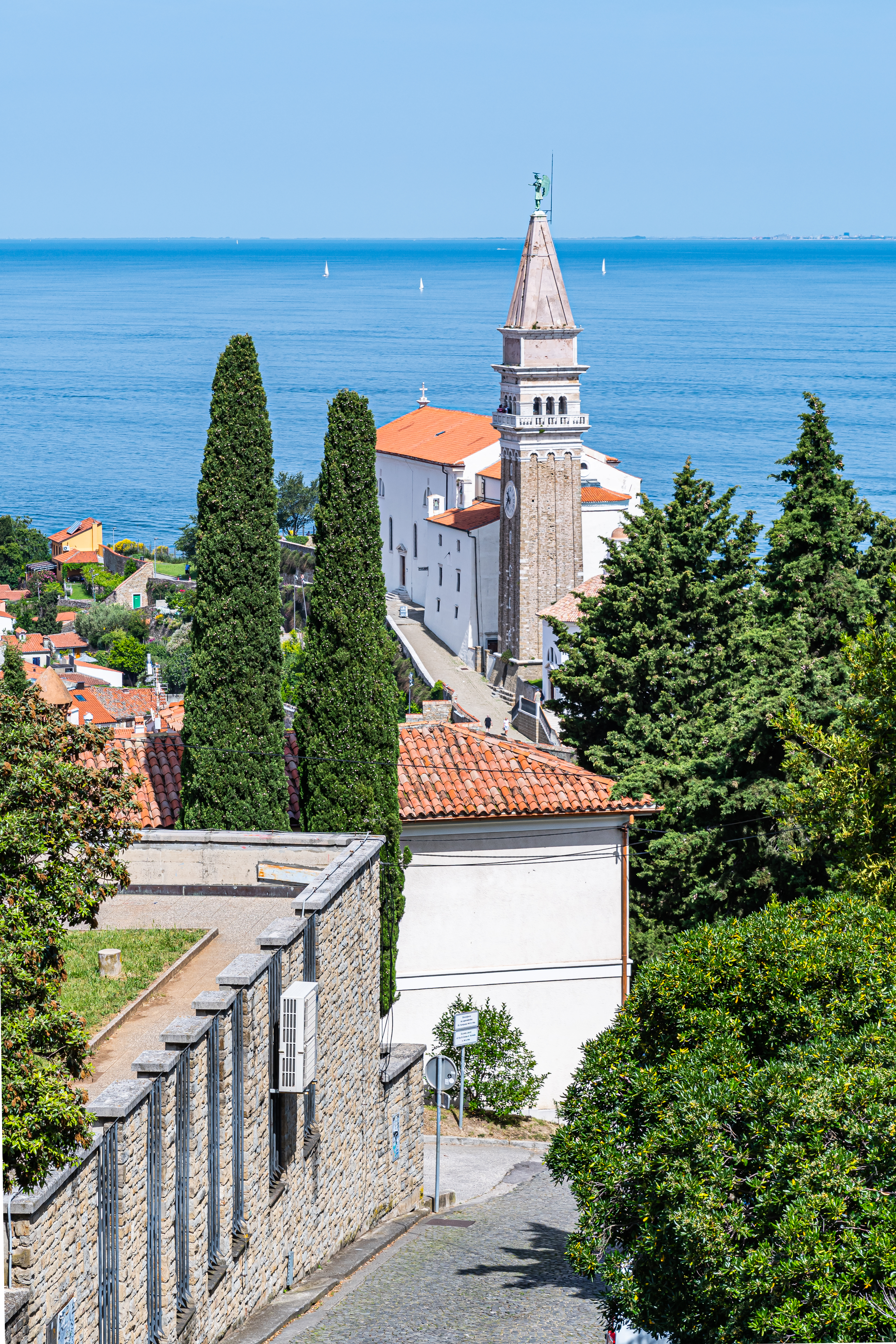
Side view of St. George's Cathedral
