= Walls of Piran =

Coordinates: 45.530243°N 13.563125°E

- Piransko obzidje
- Piran, southwestern Slovenia
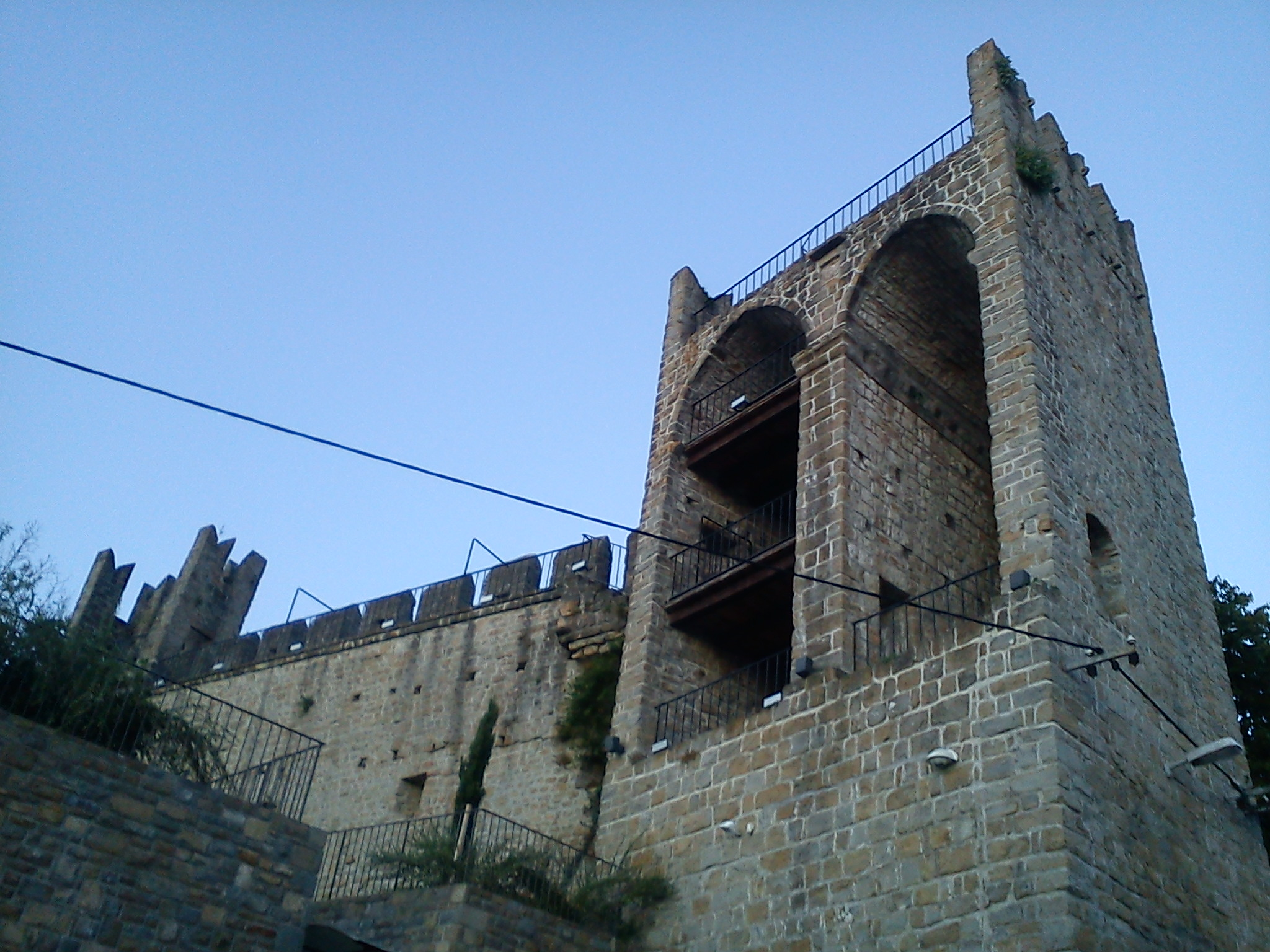
- The Third Wall

Site information
- Type: Walls
- Owner: Municipality of Piran
- Open to the public: all time
- Condition: Well-preserved

Site history
- Built: 7th century onward
- Materials: Limestone

The Walls of Piran (Slovene: Piransko obzidje) are the defensive walls of Piran, a coastal town on the Adriatic Sea in southwestern Slovenia. Significant parts of the fortification walls remain well-preserved.

== History ==
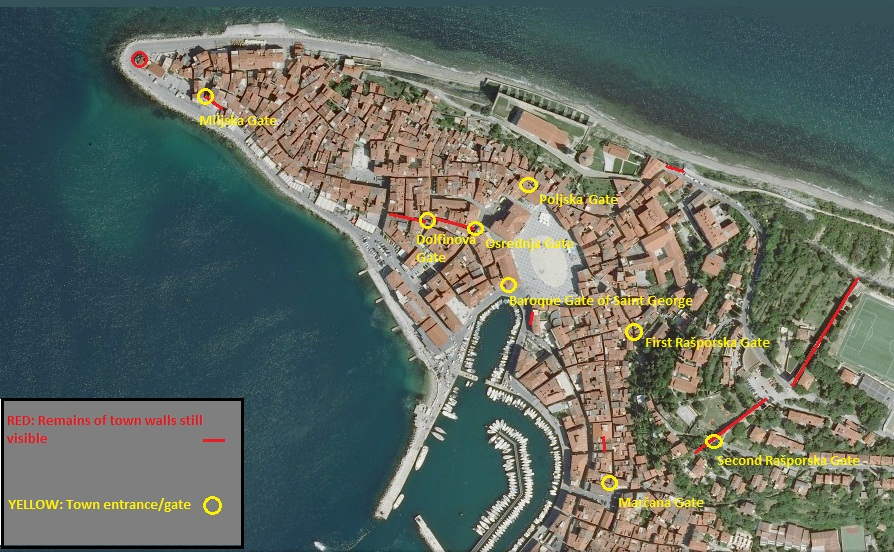
Map of the remains of the walls that are still visible

Piran's three walls were built in response to the city's expansion. The first wall was built in the 7th century, separating the town into four streets, named after each of the entrances into the town: Miljska, Stolna, Osrednja (main) and Poljska. The first wall can be seen in the old part of the town. The wall was moved south-west when new streets were built. The fortification wall, which was built along the southern coast of the town, hasn't changed much since it was first built.

At the end of the 13th century, when Piran came under Venetian rule, the town grew further and in response the second wall was built. This wall included the town quarter of Campo.

In the final phases of expansion between 1470 and 1538, the third fortification wall was built to protect the peninsula during construction. It protected the Marčana quarter. The biggest part was built when the use of gunpowder became frequent.

The third wall is almost completely intact. Its northern part is accessible while the southern wall's floors and stairs are missing or are under reconstruction. Between them a gap opened where the wall collapsed. A small portion of the third wall is next to the rectory, facing north. A tower viewer is located in one of the towers.

== Gates ==
Seven city entrances or gates remain preserved:

- The Central Gate (Osrednja vrata) at Partisan Street (Partizanska ulica).
- The gothic-styled First Rašpor Gate (Prva Rašporska vrata) is at Rozman Street (Rozmanova ulica).
- The Second Rašpor Gate (Druga Rašporska vrata) constructed in 1470 is on the third wall with the seven towers.
- The Renaissance-styled Marčana city entrance, constructed in 1534, is part of the third wall.
- The Muggia Gate (Miljska vrata) constructed in the 13th century, is among the oldest.
- The Dolfin Gate (Dolfinova vrata) is the best preserved gothic gate in the town. It was constructed in 1483 by the mayor Dolfin.
- The Field Gate (Poljska vrata) is from the 15th century. A church of Saint James the Greater is nearby and connected to the Town Palace.
- The Baroque-styled Saint George Gate (Vrata sv. Jurija), was renovated in 1660.
