= Tartini Square =

Square in Piran, Slovenia

Coordinates: 45°31′42.66″N 13°34′6.22″E

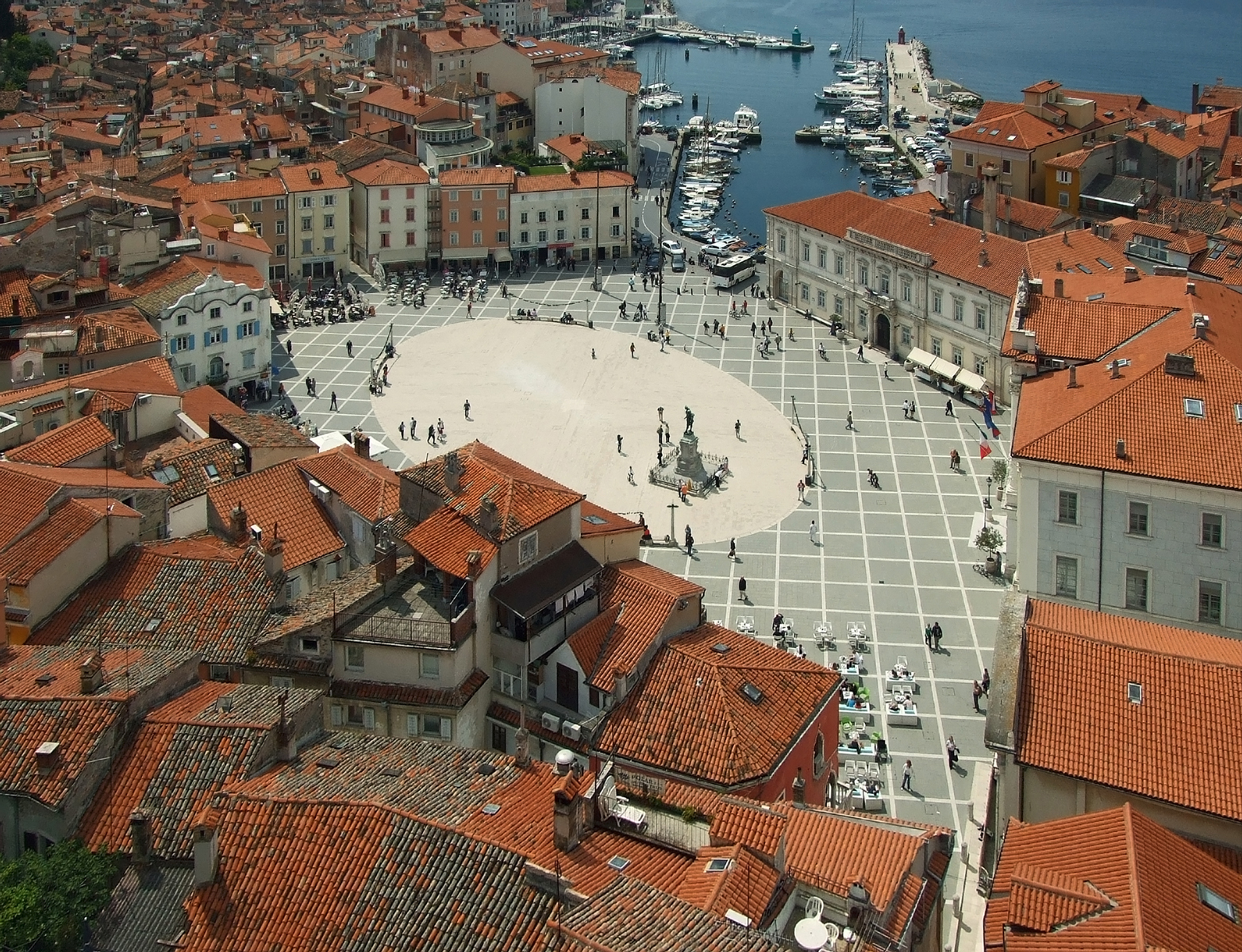
Tartini Square

Tartini Square (Slovene: Tartinijev trg, Italian: Piazza Tartini) is the largest and main town square in Piran, Slovenia. It was named after violinist and composer Giuseppe Tartini, of whom a monument was made in 1896.

== History ==
The square was once an inner dock for smaller vessels, such as fishing boats, and was located outside of the first city walls. In the Middle Ages the dock became surrounded by important buildings and palaces, because of which it became an important site of the town. However, because of the sewage which ended up there, the officials decided to bury the dock and set up a real square there in 1894. Around the newly created platform various new buildings appeared, including the town hall. Of those buildings, the only one that still has the original exterior is the Gothic house named Benečanka (Venetian house), dating to the 15th century.

The sculptor of the 1896 bronze monument to Tartini was Antonio Dal Zòtto.

From 1909 to 1912, a trolleybus path was made which connected Piran to the train station in Lucija, where the Parenzana railway was made, which connected Trieste and Poreč with various other towns. After 1912, the trolleybus was replaced by the more efficient tram, which was operational until 1953 when it was abolished. On the 300th anniversary of Tartini's birth, a huge renovation of the square occurred when an ellipse platform was formed out of white stone, designed by architect Boris Podrecca.

== Present ==
In recent years there have been some changes to reduce the number of personal vehicles within the square in favor of tourism, so during the main season (July 1 to September 1) no vehicles are allowed to park within the square; instead they have to park in the town's car park in Fornače. There is also a line of free mini-buses which drive from Piran to various other coastal towns in the main season.

== Gallery ==
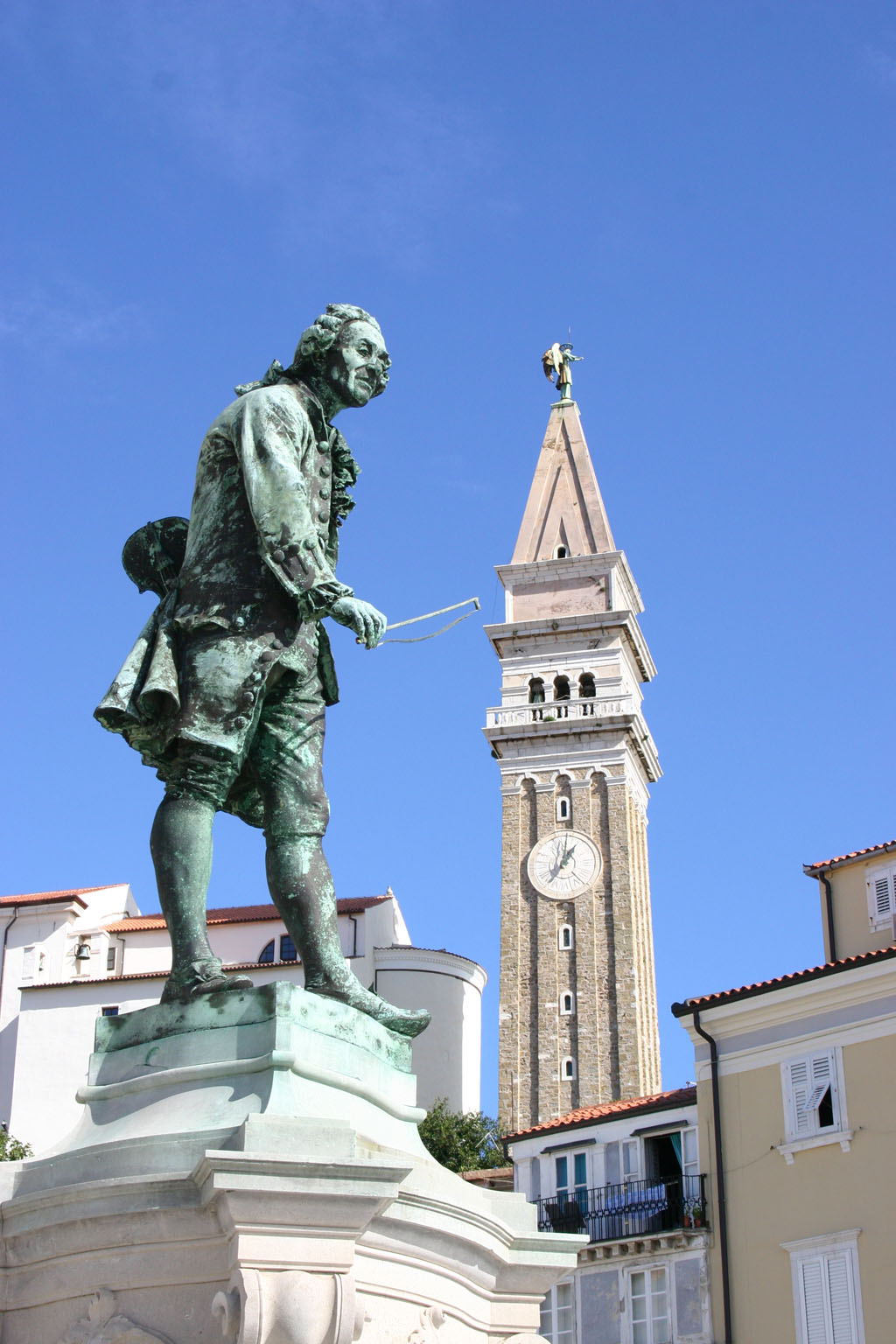
Giuseppe Tartini statue

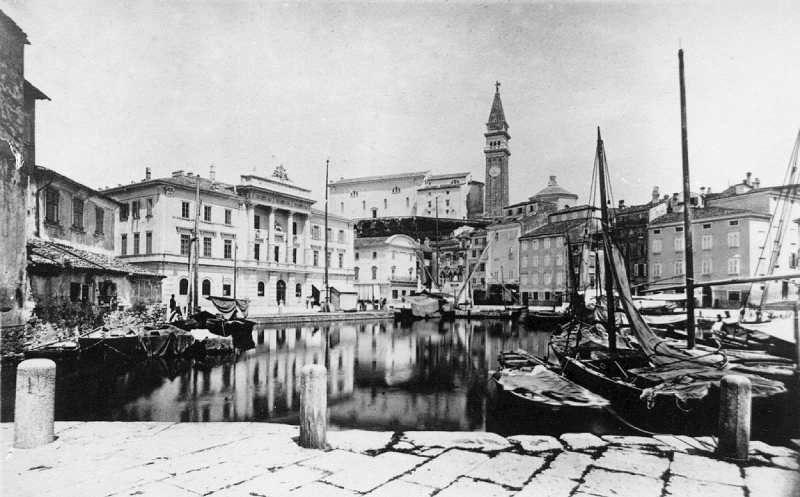
The docks before the platform
of the square was made

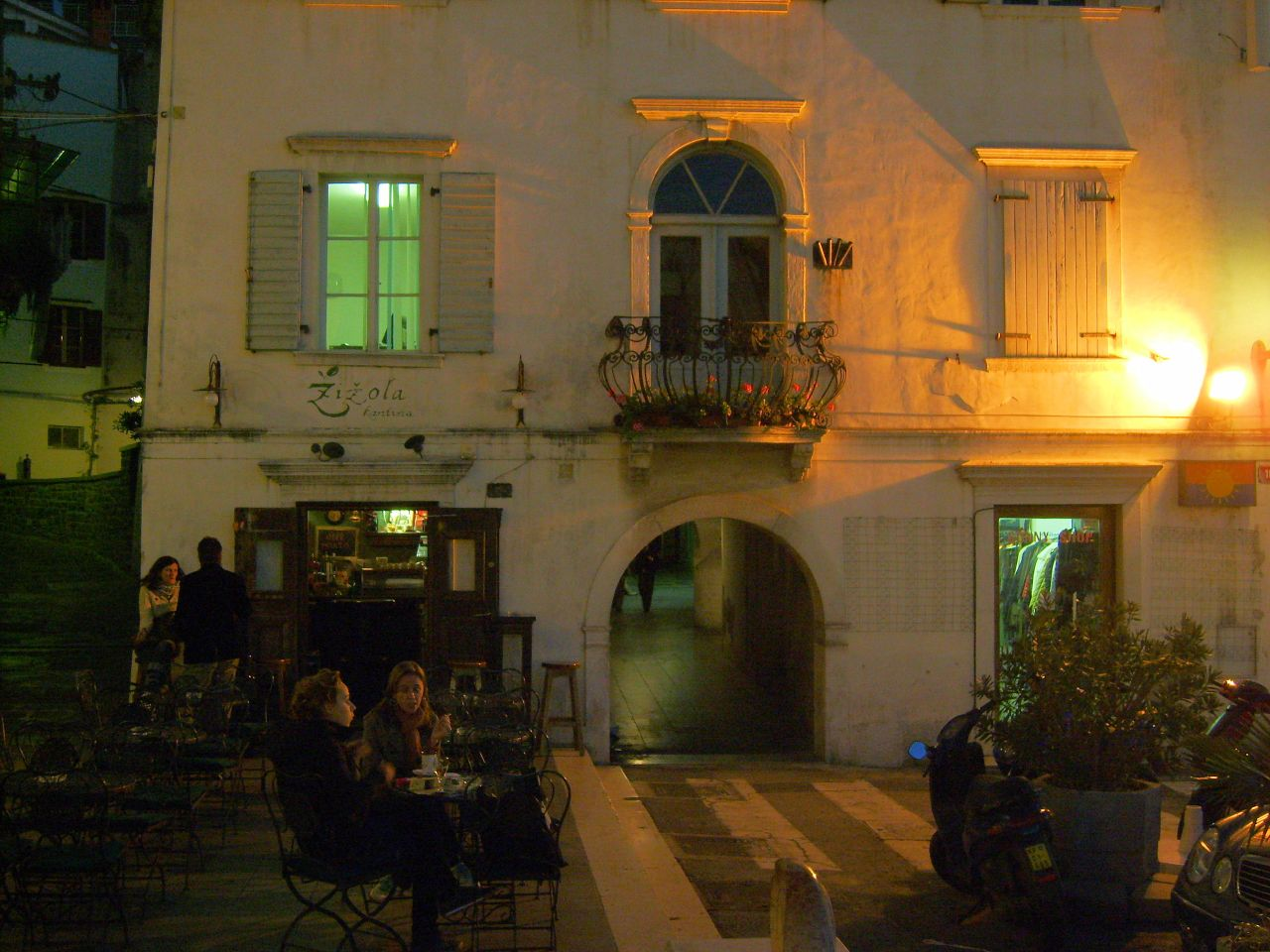
Cantina bar

== See also ==
- Slovenian Istria
- Slovenian Littoral
