= Antonio Dal Zòtto =

Italian sculptor (1841–1918)

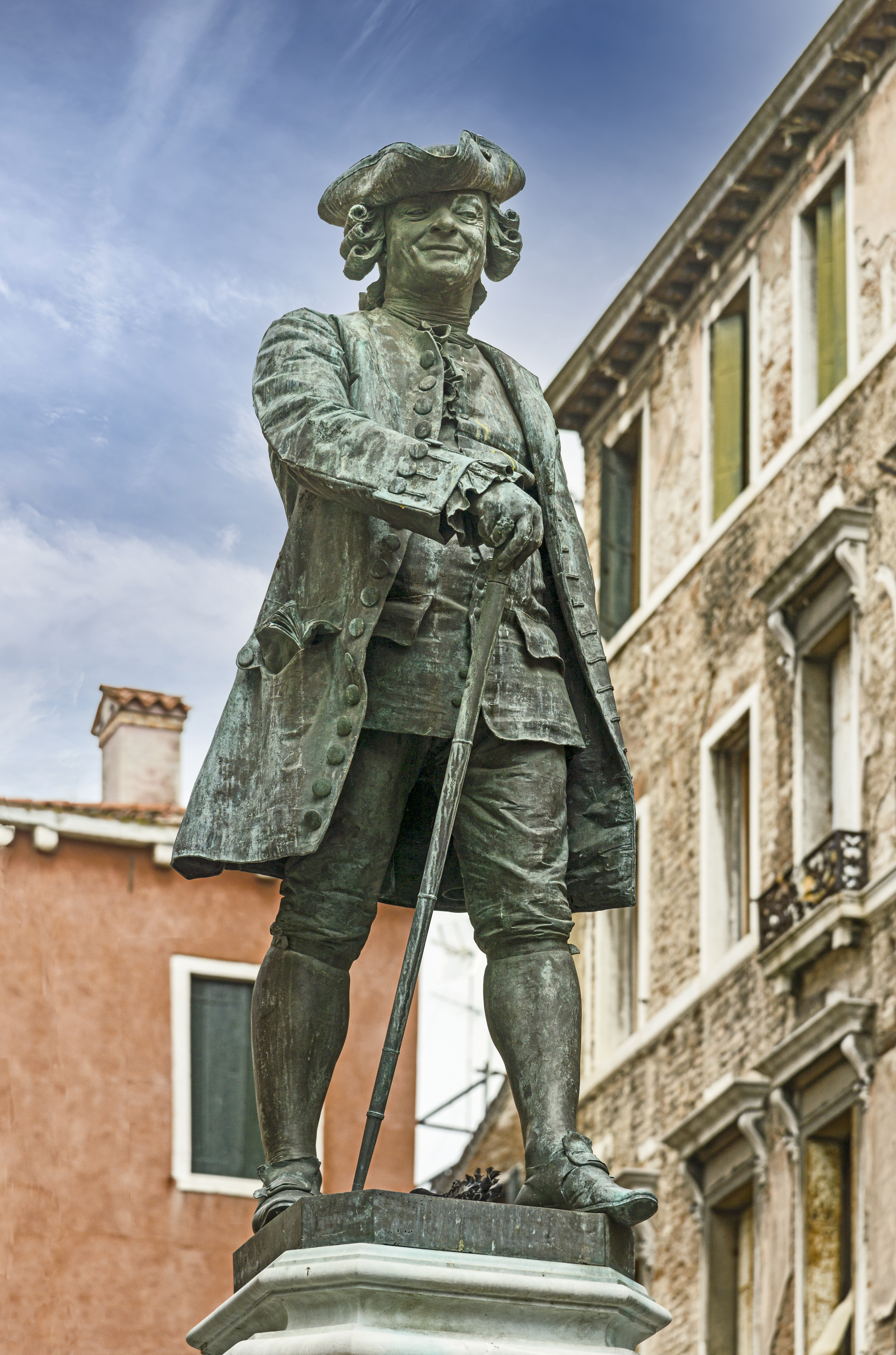
Carlo Goldoni monument, Campo san Bartolomeo Venice, 1883

Antonio Dal Zòtto (1841 in Venice – 1918 in Venice) was an Italian sculptor.

Initially trained in the studio of his father who was a carver of marble ornamentation, he then attended the Academy of Fine Arts of Venice, where he became a pupil of Luigi Borro, Michelangelo Grigoletti, and Luigi Ferrari. In 1870 he was nominated professor of modelling and anatomy at the School of Applied Art and Industry, and in 1879 he moved to teach at the Venetian Academy of Fine Arts, where he remained a teacher for 15 years.

Among his works, completed in a realist style are a bronze monument to Titian (1880) in Pieve di Cadore. In Venice, he has two major works: a monument to Carlo Goldoni (1883) in Campo San Bartolommeo and a monument to Doge Sebastiano Venier (1907) in the church of Santi Giovanni e Paolo. In 1880 he completed a bust of Vittorio Emanuele II, for the city of Este. He also created a popular bronze sculpture of Giuseppe Tartini (1896) in Piran, Slovenia. He made bronze busts of Francesco Avesani, Alvise Querini, and General Giuseppe Sirtori.
