= Trolleybuses in Piran =

Public transport (1909–1912)

Piran-Lucija Trolleybus Line
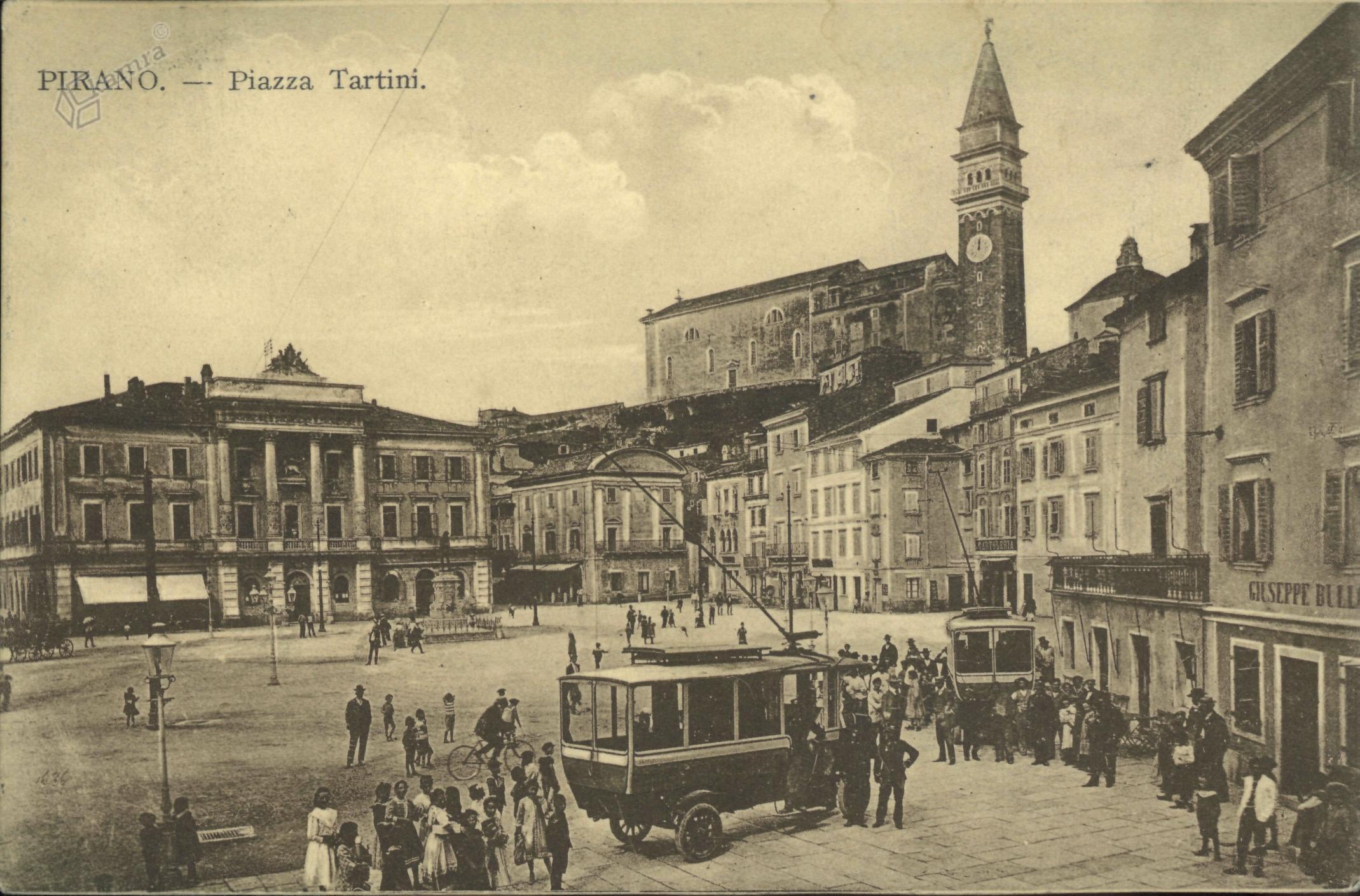
- A photograph of Tartini Square displaying two trolleybuses.

Operation
- Locale: Piran, Austro-Hungary
- Open: 24 October 1909
- Close: 20 July 1912
- Status: Closed
- Routes: 1
- Owner: Municipality of Piran
- Operator: Municipality of Piran

Infrastructure
- Electrification: 500 V DC parallel overhead lines
- Depot: 1
- Stock: 5

The Piran trolleybus line was a public transport system that operated between 1909 and 1912 between the Tartini Square in Piran and the railway station in the nearby town of Lucija. It was replaced by a tramway in 1912.

== History ==
At the end of the nineteenth century, Piran had a population of around 12,700 people (around three times more than today). It was also one of the largest cities in Istria and was an important shopping district. The municipality was concerned that Piran was able to fall into a decline if the most important transport links avoided the city, so the municipality strived to get a new narrow gauge railway connecting Trieste and Poreč to include a stop in Piran. Nevertheless, the terrain did not allow for such a development, so Piran instead got a revised stop around three miles away from the nearby town of Lucija. When this narrow gauge railway opened in 1902, the municipality asked the Royal Ministry of Railways of the Austro-Hungarian empire at the time to grant their request to open either a horse-powered or an electric-powered tramway between Piran and Lucija to support the growing number of visitors to Piran due to the new railway link. While the municipality waited for the request to be approved, they temporarily ran horse-drawn chariots which were unsuitable due to the Macadam roads at the time.

== Operation ==
The Royal Ministry of Railways did not respond to Piran's request, however in 1907, the municipality got word that the town of Gmünd successfully set up the first trolleybus line in the Austro-Hungarian empire. Since the municipality would not need the permission of the ministry to build a trolleybus line, the city briskly began construction on one. The municipality paid a German company to put up three miles of overhead wire between Piran's Tartini Square and the railway station in Lucija. Piran's trolleybus system was the first in the Balkans and it was also one of the world's first ten.

The five trolleybuses were built by Austrian-based Motoren-Daimler and ran at a fifteen-minute interval. Each trolleybus had a capacity of 25 people (fifteen seated, ten standing). Each trolleybus was powered by two Lohner-Porsche electric motors. The electricity used to power the line was generated using a steam engine at a thermal power plant in the dockyards of Portorož that was opened by Francesco Apollonio thirty years prior. The steam engine used coal from Sečovlje and had the power to produce 100 hp, there was also a transformer attached.

The trolleybus line had many issues. The first being the poorly maintained Macadam roads combined with stiff, solid wheels made for a pretty uncomfortable ride. The trolleybuses' poles often disconnected during periods of faster winds which meant the driver had to leave the trolleybus and manually put the poles back up. It was clear the trolleybus was not a permanent solution.

== Closure ==
On the 11th of September 1911, the municipality got word that the Royal Ministry of Railways approved the construction of a tramway linking Piran with Lucija. This meant the tramway's construction could begin. The trolleybus line's overhead wire support poles were reused in the construction of the tramway's overhead wires while the trolleybuses were briskly removed. Unfortunately, it is not clear what the fate of the five trolleybuses was; whether they were sold or scrapped is not known.

== See also ==
- Trams in Piran
- Trams in Ljubljana

== Sources ==
- Brate, T. (2007). Parenzana, železnica za vse čase. Ljubljana: Kmečki glas.
