= Narrow-gauge railways in Slovenia =

Most Slovenian railway lines were built during the Austro-Hungarian Empire.

== Overview ==
1,000 mm (3 ft 3 3/8 in) gauge

- Ljubljana tram system; 18.5 km (11.5 mi), 1901-1958

760 mm (2 ft 5 15/16 in) gauge

- Poljčane - Zreče; 20.8 km (12.9 mi), closed.
- Piran tram system; 5 km (3.1 mi) 750 V DC electrified tram, 1907-1952
- Parenzana railway; Triest - Škofije - Sečovlje border - Poreč, 33 km (21 mi), 1902-1935.

750 mm (2 ft 5 1/2 in) gauge

- Kobarid - Pojana border - Cividale del Friuli, 9 km (5.6 mi), Società Veneta 1915-1932

620 mm (2 ft 13/32 in) gauge

- Postojna Cave railway in Postojna; 2.5 km (1.6 mi) double track, opened in 1872.

600 mm (1 ft 11 5/8 in) gauge

- Brestanica to the north; 6 km (3.7 mi), closed construction railway.

== See also ==
- List of steam locomotives in Slovenia
- Ljubljana Castle funicular, 70 m (230 ft), opened in 2006.
- Slovenian Railway Museum
