= Sveta Lucija =

Sveta Lucija may refer to several places in Slovenia:

- Lucija, Piran, a settlement in the Municipality of Piran, known as Sveta Lucija until 1961
- Most na Soči, a settlement in the Municipality of Tolmin, known as Sveta Lucija ob Soči until 1955
- Zadnja Vas, a settlement in the Municipality of Radovljica, known as Sveta Lucija until 1955

or Croatia

- Sveta Lucija, Croatia, a settlement in the Municipality of Oprtalj
