= Parenzana =

Defunct Italy-Croatia railway line

Parenzana Porečanka
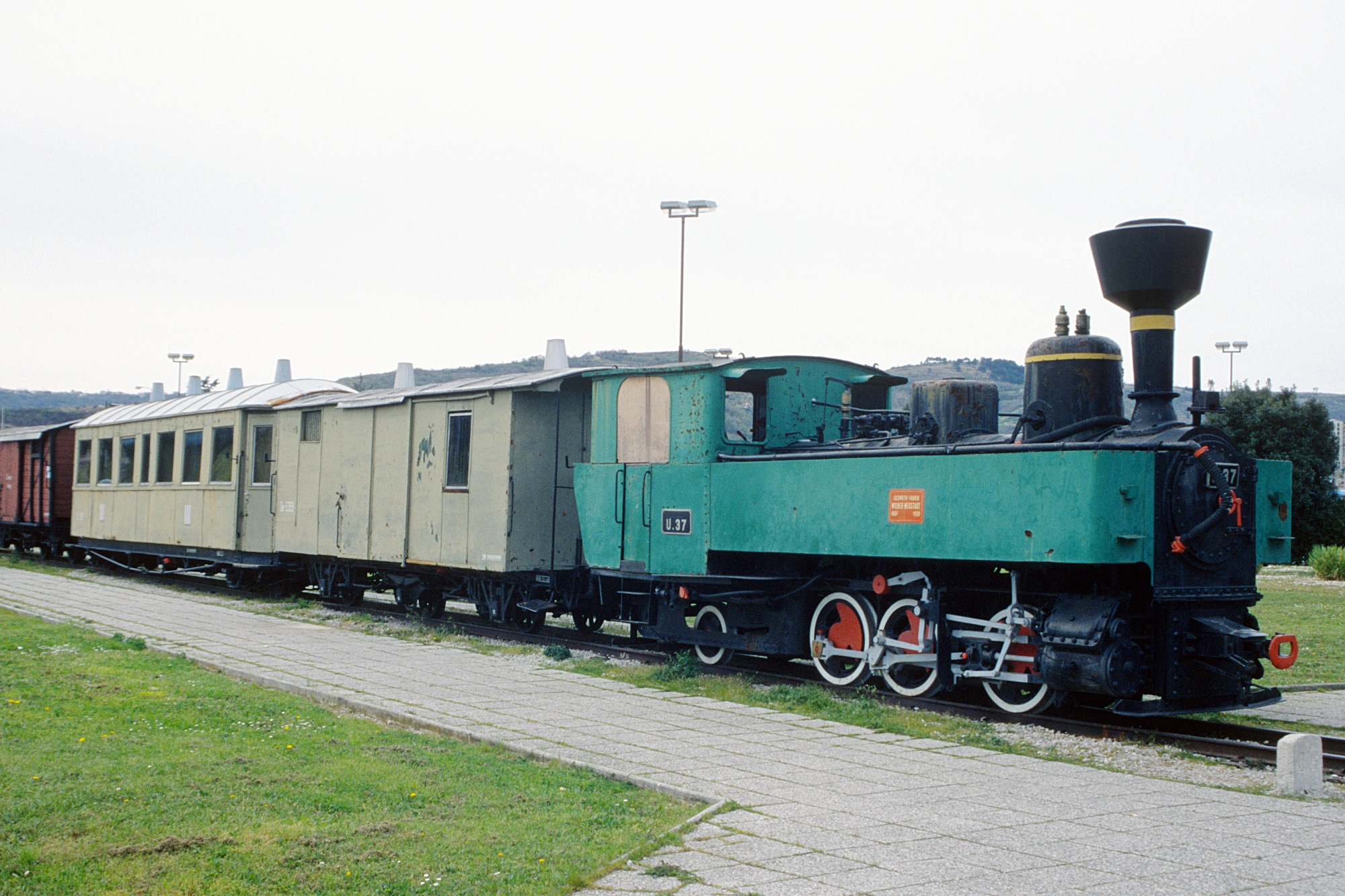

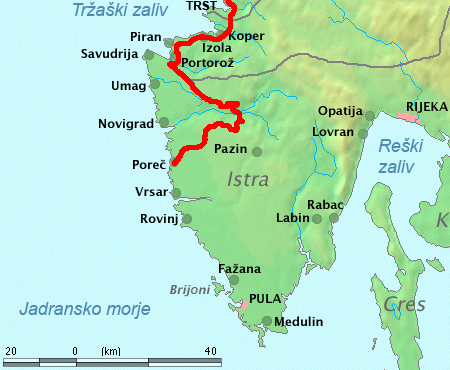
- Map of the Parenzana railway

Overview
- Headquarters: Vienna (1902–1920), Pula (1920–1935)
- Reporting mark: TPC
- Locale: Istria
- Dates of operation: 1 April 1902–31 August 1935

Technical
- Track gauge: 760 mm (2 ft 5 15/16 in)

The Parenzana in Italian or Porečanka in Slovene and Croatian is one of the nicknames of a defunct 760mm/15 15/16 inch narrow gauge railway (operating between 1902 and 1935) between Trieste and Poreč (at that time Parenzo, hence the name Parenzana), in present-day Italy, Slovenia and Croatia.

== Name ==
When constructed, the railway's official name was Parenzaner Bahn or simply Parenzaner. Later it was known as the Istrian Railway and TPC (standing for "Trieste - Parenzo (now Poreč) - Canfanaro (now Kanfanar)" ).

Among the area's current majority Croats and Slovenes, the railway is also known as the Istranka or Istrijanka, both meaning 'Istrian'. In Slovene, the railway is also known as Porečanka or Parenzana, while in Croatian it is sometimes referred to as Porečka or Porečanka. In Italian the railway's nickname is Parenzana.

== Route ==
The railway started at St. Andrew station (now a railway museum) in Trieste (Trst). It passed Milje (Muggia) and entered present day Slovenia in Škofije. The route first passed Dekani then turned towards the coast, passed Koper, Izola, Strunjan, Portorož, Lucija, Sečovlje, crossed the Dragonja river and entered the territory of the present day Croatia. Then it turned westwards, reached Valica, where Savudrija's station stood, then turned eastwards towards the Istrian interior. It passed Buje, climbed to Grožnjan, where soon, after passing this town, it reached its highest point at elevation of 293 meters above sea level, before starting to descend to Livade (13m above sea level) where it crossed the Mirna river. Then it started climbing again via Motovun and Vižinada to Baldaši where it reached another local extreme at 273 meters above sea level. From there it started to descend gradually, passing Višnjan and reaching Poreč after 123 kilometers from Trieste.

Although initially planned and much effort made by local authorities, the fork from Valica to Umag was never built. On the other hand, since 1909 Piran was connected with the station in Portorož (at that time Portorož was a spa and a stop for guests was arranged in a private villa two years after the rail line was completed), first with a trolleybus, in 1912 replaced by an electrical tramway which was operating till 1953.

=== List of stations ===
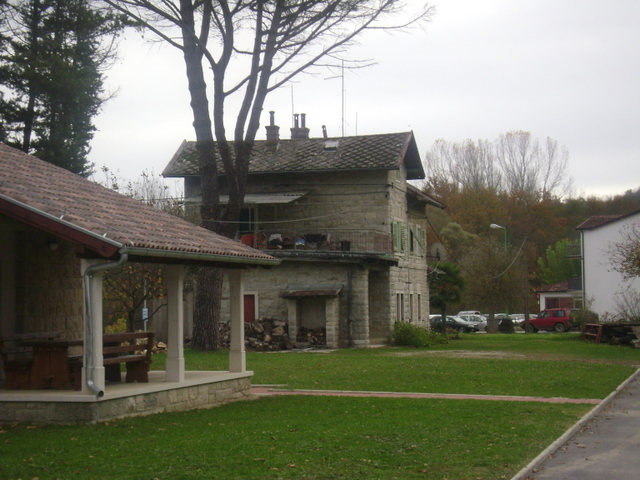
Livade railway station

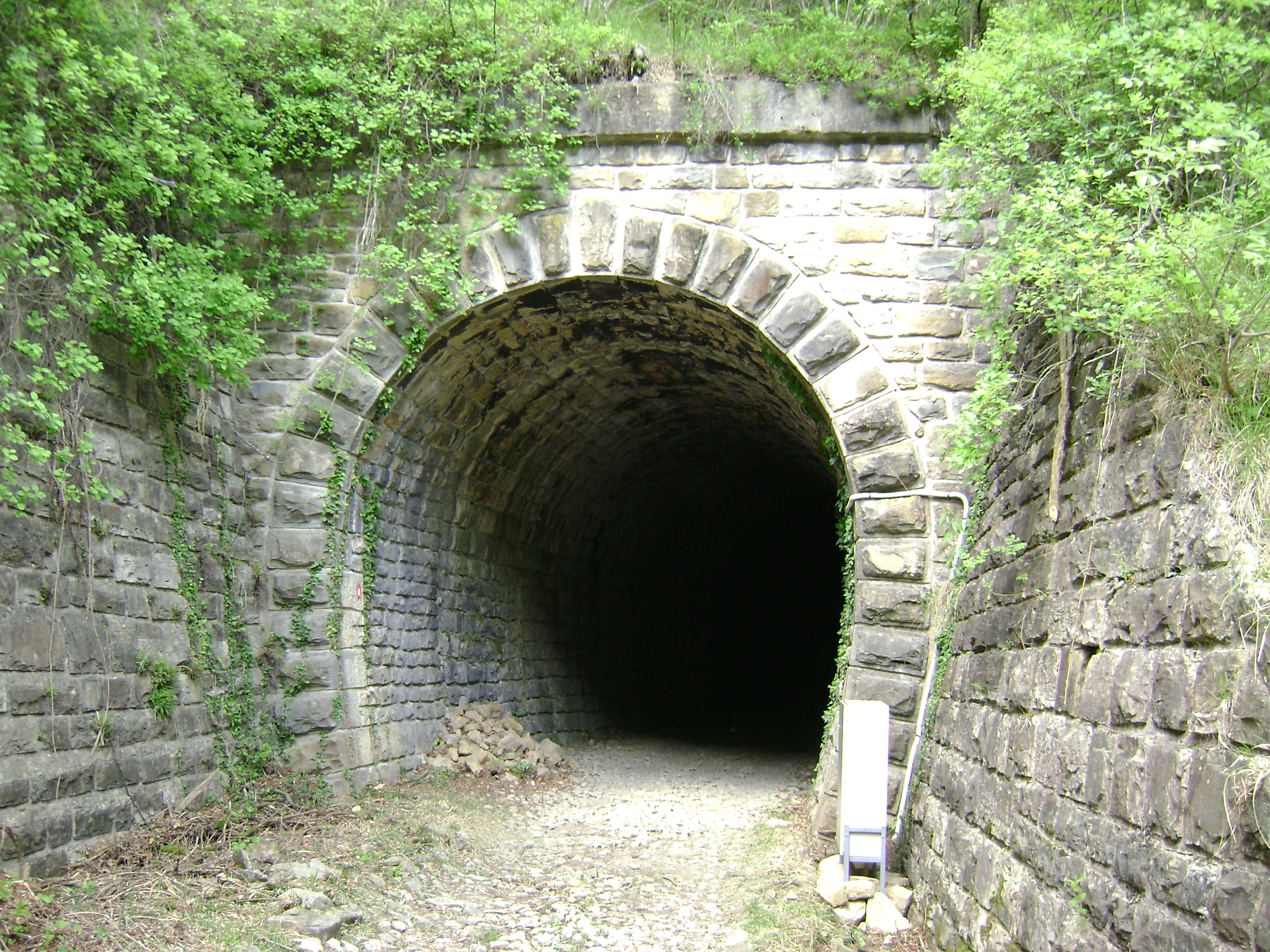
Freski tunnel entrance

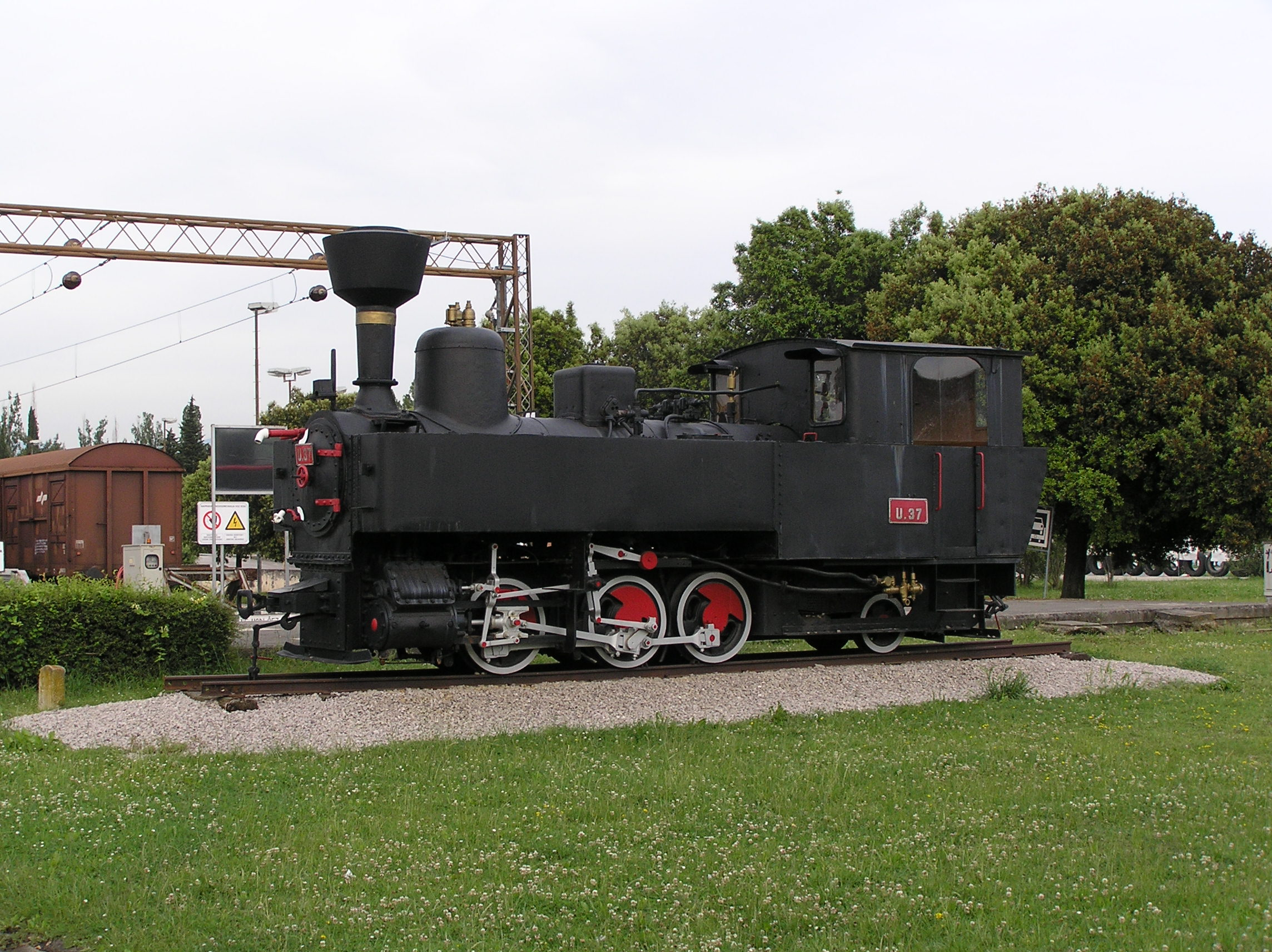
U.37 locomotive monument in Koper (side)

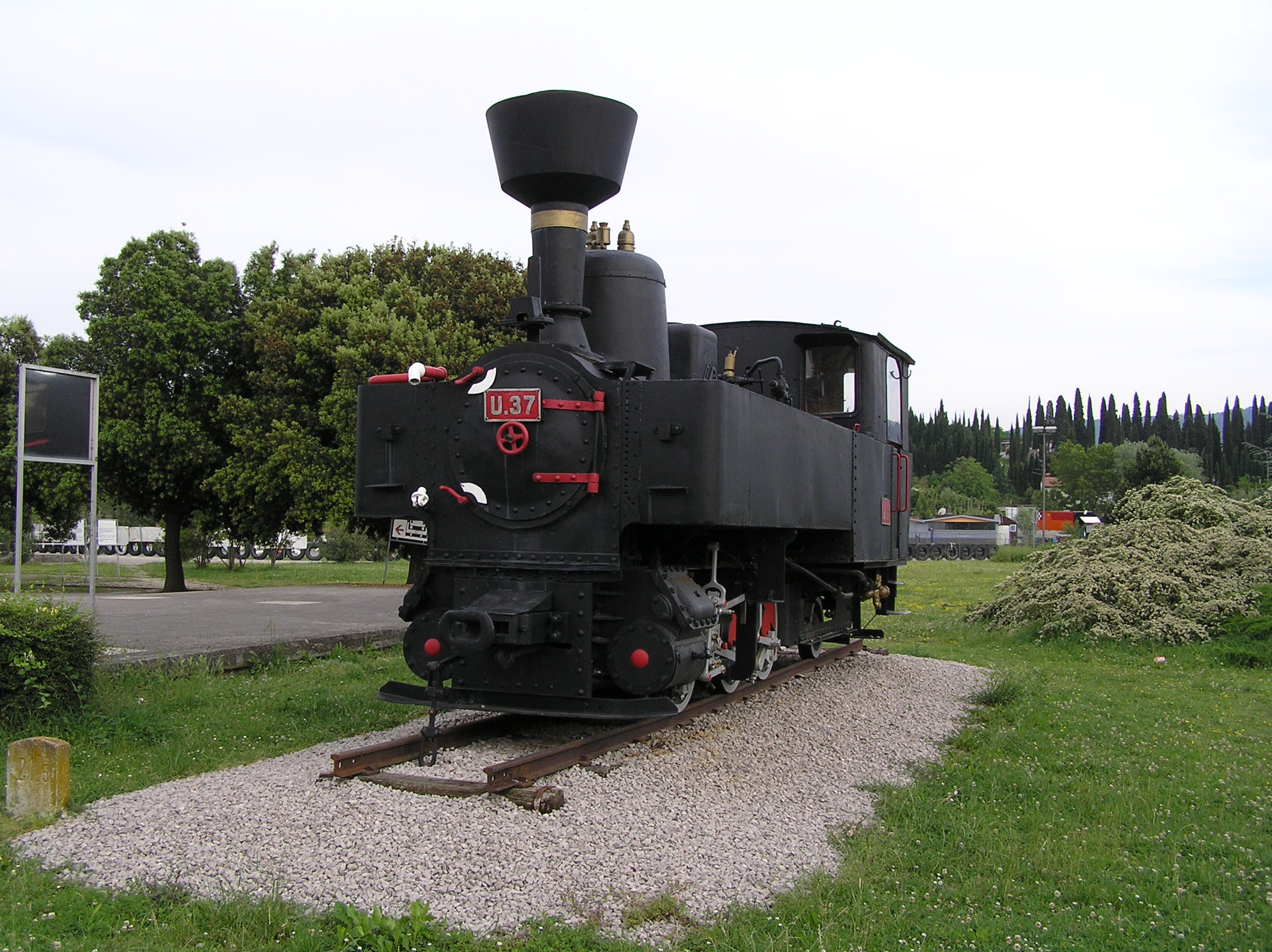
U.37 locomotive monument in Koper (front)

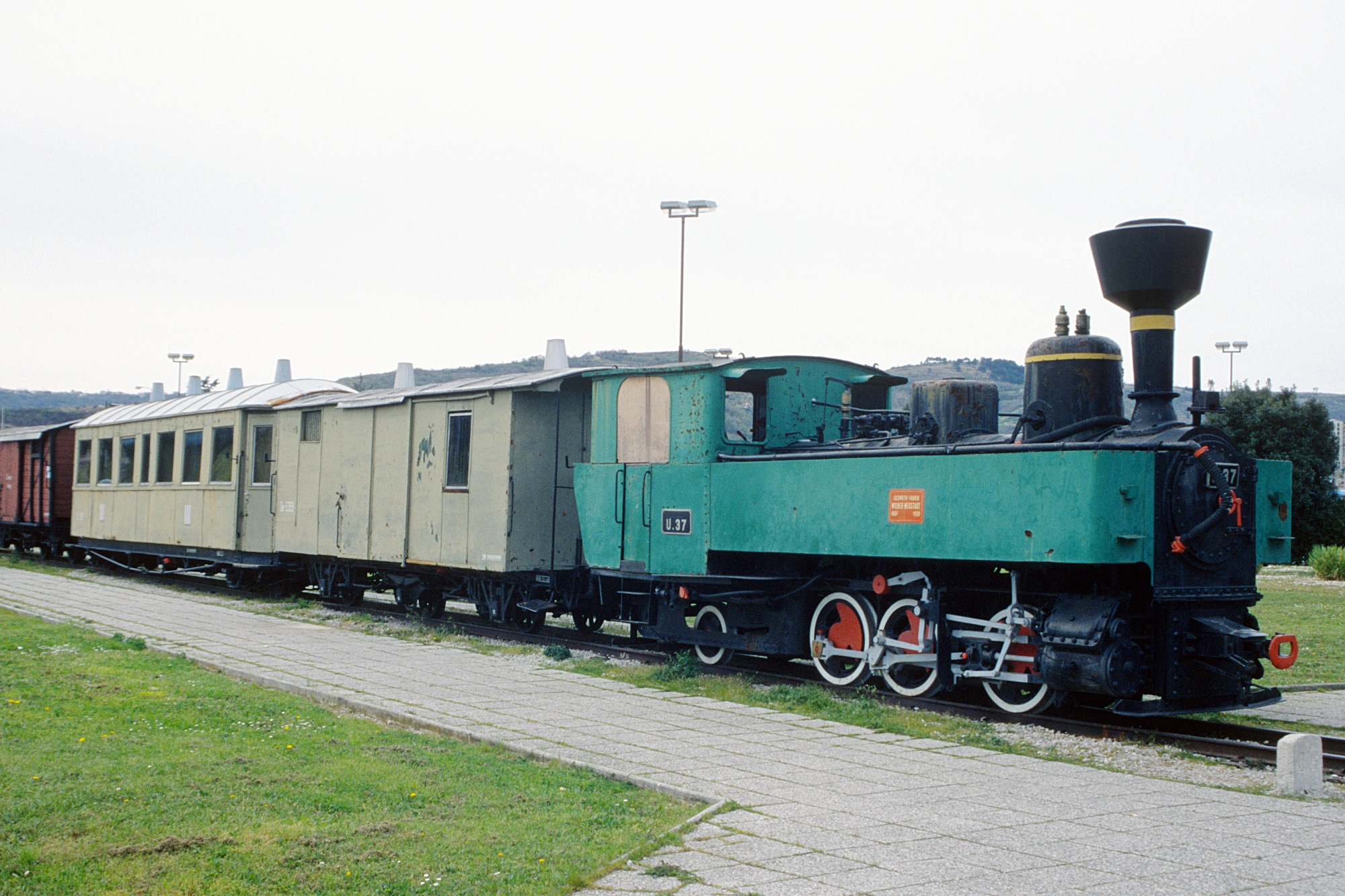
U.37 locomotive monument in Koper (with cars)

In parentheses the Italian names. Present day in Italy

- Trieste Campo Marzio
- Trieste Scalo Legnami
- Trieste Servola
- Monte Castiglione
- Val Rosandra (Rožna dolina)
- Muggia (Milje)

Present day in Slovenia

- Spodnje Škofije (Albaro Vescovà-Scoffie)
- Dekani (Villa Decani)
- Lazaret (Lazzaretto-Risano)
- Koper (Capodistria)
- Semedela (Semedella)
- Izola (Isola d'Istria)
- Strunjan (Madonna di Strugnano)
- Portorož (Portorose)
- Lucija (Santa Lucia)
- Dragonja (San Bortolo)
- Sečovlje (Sicciole)

Present day in Croatia

- Savudrija (Salvore)
- Markovac-Mažurija (Mazzoria)
- Kaldanija (Caldania)
- Buje (Buie)
- Triban (Tribano)
- Grožnjan (Grisignana)
- Kostanjica (Castagna)
- Završje (Piemonte d'Istria)
- Oprtalj (Pòrtole)
- Livade (Levade)
- Motovun (Montona)
- Karojba (Caroiba)
- Rakotule (Raccosole)
- Vižinada (Visinada)
- Baldaši (Baldassi)
- Labinci-Markovac (Santa Domenica)
- Višnjan (Visignano)
- Nova Vas (Villanova di Parenzo)
- Poreč (Parenzo)

== Technical data ==
- total length: 123 kilometres (76 mi)
- track gauge: 760 mm (2 ft 5 15/16 in)
- total number of railway stations and stops: 35
- the lowest point: 2 m (6 ft 7 in) above sea level (in Trieste and Koper)
- the highest point: 293 m (961 ft) above sea level (near Grožnjan)
- number of curves: 604
- the shortest bend radius: 60 m (200 ft)
- the steepest inclination: 28‰
- number of tunnels: 9, total length 1,530 m (5,020 ft)
- number of bridges: 11 (the most important rivers to cross: the Osp, the Rižana, the Dragonja and the Mirna)
- number of viaducts: 6
- average speed: 25 km/h (16 mph)
- the highest speed: 31 km/h (19 mph)

== History ==
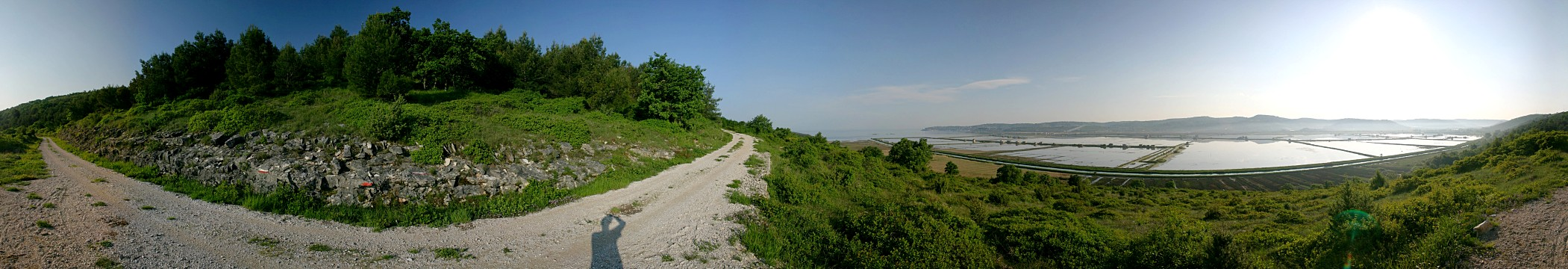
The Porečanka and the Sečovlje saltworks

When laws of Austria-Hungary allowed constructing local narrow gauge railways, the first economical analyses of a west Istrian railway were prepared around 1880. In 1888 a Berlin based company Sanderop & comp, led by Peter Walderstein started to prepare project plan of the route. A Trieste based company of Luigi Buzzi did the same independently of Sanderop & comp. In 1898 a construction permit was obtained and in 1900 the TPC company was founded in Vienna, its chief was Ludovico Rizzi, then a governor of Austrian Littoral. The construction started the same year. Several contractors were assigned the construction works. The section between Trieste and Portorož was constructed by Butoraz and Zifer, both from Trieste, the section between Portorož and Buje was built by Filip Zupančič's company from Ljubljana, the section between Buje and Vižinada was assigned to Brunetti, List and Radl, all from Graz, and the section between Vižinada and Poreč was constructed by Pellegrini and Strohmeier, both from Vienna as well. On 1 April 1902 the first section between Trieste and Buje was opened. The other section between Buje and Poreč was opened on 15 December 1902. Initial plans included an extension to Kanfanar, then a rail junction of standard gauge rail lines from Divača, Pula and Rovinj (the section between Kanfanar and Rovinj is now defunct) but it was never built due to lack of funds and later due to upcoming World War I.

The railway brought economic progress to towns along its route. It was mainly used to transport agricultural products (with fish and salt) to the Trieste market. Products of Piran's chemical industry and dimension stones from quarries in Grožnjan, Momjan, Kanegra, etc. were transported as well. During the World War I the railway was used to transport military and food supplies for the local population.

After the war and the independence of most parts of Austria-Hungary, the whole of Istria became part of the Kingdom of Italy. The railway was taken over by Italians, its headquarters were moved from Vienna to Pula, locomotives and personnel were brought from other parts of Italy. For about a decade the railway was still profitable, then the Great Depression arose and the railway could no longer compete with developing maritime, bus and automobile transport. The fascist regime found an excellent opportunity to further persecution of Slovene and Croatian population, forming majority of Istrian hinterland population. From Rome the order to abandon the railway arrived and the last train was operated on August 31, 1935. The economic situation deteriorated further as a result, and forced many people to emigrate. The rolling stock was sold to other Italian railways, mainly to Sicily, and a legend tells that tracks were dismantled to be transported to Abyssinia, then an Italian colony, but never reached Africa as the ship sank somewhere in the Mediterranean Sea.

During the operation of railway several minor accidents occurred. Some were a consequence of human factor while others resulted from a fact that planners from interior of the Austria-Hungary did not know the local microclimate well. Especially around Milje gusts of bora caused several derailments. The most tragic occurred on 31 March 1910 when three people were killed and many wounded. Another derailment near Muggia (Milje) happened in 1916, but no victims are reported. In 1917 Russian prisoners of war deliberately caused a derailment. An engineer and a fireman were killed.

The most tragic event in the railway's history occurred on 19 March 1921 at 18:20. A group of fascists was traveling to Trieste. During the stop in Strunjan they shot from the train at a group of children playing near the track. Two children were killed, 2 maimed and 3 wounded. In memory of this event Božidar Tvrdy later composed a poem Za Šentjanom je utonilo sonce (the Sun drowned at Šentjan, full text in Slovenian).

After the World War II several ideas arose to reconstruct the railway at least partially for the purpose of tourism, however this never happened. The last such initiative came from the Croatian association for reconstruction of the Parenzana railway in 2003. However, at the moment this does not seem likely to happen. During preparation of railway's centennial celebration, the Italian and most of Slovenian sections were, with the financial help of the European Union, converted into a recreation Trail of Health and Friendship (Pot zdravja in prijateljstva in Slovenian, Percorso della salute e dell'amicizia in Italian) for pedestrians and cyclists and similar works started at the Croatian side as well. On the Croatian side, viaducts have had new safety rails installed and some tunnels are now illuminated. The section between Vizinada and Motovun has been popular with walkers for some years. The section between Livade and Grosnjan is also accessible. In 2008, the section between Markovac and Visnjan was cleared. In 2010 it was apparent that efforts were being made to clear other sections of bushes and self seeded trees that were blocking them. Clearing has been going on near Salvore/Savudrija. The section from Vizinada to the Ypsilon (the fast road from Pula to the Slovenian border) was cleared in January 2011. In two places near Ohnici and Baldasi, vineyards appear to have been grown right across the trackbed, which is no longer visible at these points. When the Ypsilon was constructed, it caused the only major cut in the trackbed and it is unfortunate that an accommodation arch was not incorporated when it was planned. Beyond the Ypsilon, the trackbed has been cleared through to Markovac and the section from there to Višnjan was previously cleared. There is some sign of clearing starting between Višnjan and Nova Vas.

== Travelling ==
Due to frequent bends, curves and ascents the train's average speed was a mere 25 km/h; together with all stops, the whole journey between Trieste and Poreč took approximately 7 hours. At slower sections passengers often alighted the train to pick fruit from one of many orchards, or to relieve themselves (coaches were not fitted with toilets), then boarded the train anew. Fare dodgers would also board the train in such a manner, so as to avoid ticket controls. At the steepest grades the steam locomotives often had trouble ascending the slope, prompting passengers alight the train and help push it. Trains occasionally had to stop after children would grease the rails with figs, and the journey could only continue once the tracks were cleaned.

A P class steam locomotive on the Parenzana

== Locomotives and rolling stock ==
During the first years of the railway U-series 4-axle (0-6-2 / C'1) steam locomotives without tenders were used to operate trains. They proved underpowered for the many ascends and bends, so more efficient locomotives of P-series were ordered. These 0-8-2 (D'1) locomotives were designed by Karl Gölsdorf (as a combination of a larger version of U-series and a smaller version of a tender locomotive that were already operating in Bosnia) and the first three were assembled and delivered by the Krauss factory in Linz in 1911. Additional 3 were ordered but never finished due to the World War I. In 1903 a small single car train with a steam engine at one end, a BCM/s51, produced by Komarek factory in Vienna, was introduced. It did not meet all expectations so in 1906 it was sold to a local railway in Pinzgau. After Italian annexation of Istria the new administration of the railroad ordered four additional locomotives (copies of the P-series) from Officine Meccaniche Italiane in Reggio Emilia. They were delivered in 1922 and 1923.

All cars were 8.5 metres (28 ft) long. Passenger cars had 30 seats and were paraffin oil lit. They had balconies but no toilets. In addition, freight cars (both open and covered ones) and luggage cars were in use. In 1935, just before the decision to close down the line, a total of 180 cars of all types were in use.

== Remains ==
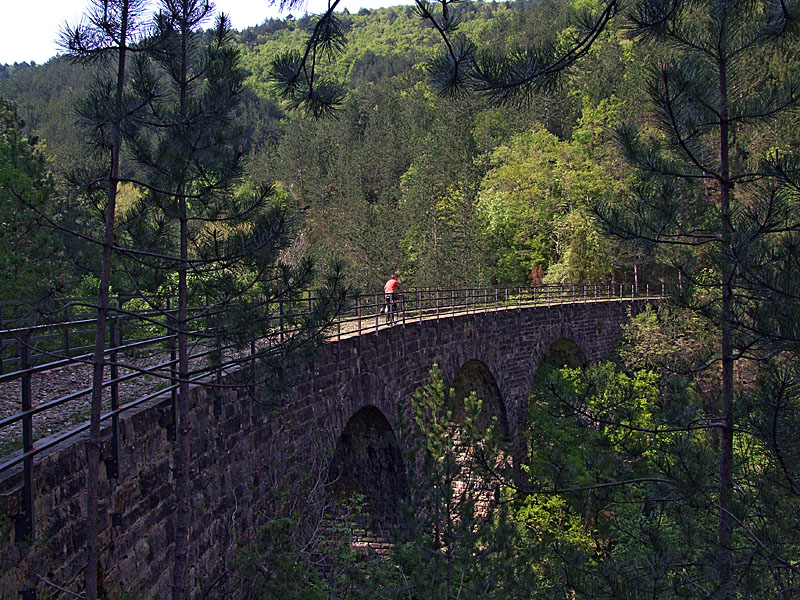
A preserved viaduct Freski - 68.5 m long, 30 m high.

Although all tracks were removed, a large part of other railway infrastructure (embankments, cuttings, bridges, viaducts, etc.) survives today. According to the Croatian association Porečanka it could still be possible to reconstruct the railway at 94% of the original route. Several milestones with the inscription "T.P.C." still stand along the former route.

Most of railway stations survive as well, mostly they were converted into homes, workshops, warehouses. The former "Savudrija station" in Valica still carries the original sign with an inscription "Salvore".

All 9 tunnels also still exist. Some of them were used to grow mushrooms. The others were and still are used by foot travellers and cyclists as "shortcuts". Probably the most famous of such tunnels is the tunnel Valeta between Strunjan and Portorož.

Of the original U-series of locomotives, U-37 is still preserved. After withdrawing from the Porečanka it was sold to the Austrian railway between Weiz, Birkfeld and Ratten, during World War I it was moved to a Bosnian logging railway and later it was operating at the brickworks in Busovača. After its "retirement" it was exhibited in front of the new railway station in Koper (built in 1967 for the new standard gauge line from Divača) together with a few Bosnian cars, that were never used at the Porečanka. Another preserved U-series locomotive, U-40, is still in operation at Austrian Murtalbahn.

Two of P-series locomotives survived. P-7 is now exhibited in the technical museum Leonardo da Vinci in Milan. P-4 arrived to Bosnia and Serbia during World War II. Before "retirement" it was in use around Čačak. In front of Izola's petrol station a P-3 was exhibited in 2002 but this locomotive never operated at the Porečanka. In the 1980s the railway museum in Ljubljana acquired another interesting locomotive of P-series. It was assembled after World War I by Krauss from the parts that were initially intended for three additional locomotives ordered by the TPC administration but the war canceled the order.

== In popular culture ==
The train was the subject of the song "La Parenzana" by the Istrian avant-garde music group Gori Ussi Winnetou.

== See also ==
- Istria
- Poreč
