= Nardacci =

Nardacci is an Italian surname. Notable people with the surname include:

- Anne M. Nardacci (born 1977), American jurist
- Nick Nardacci (1901–1961), American professional football halfback and quarterback

== See also ==
- Narducci, surname
