= History of rail transport in Slovenia =

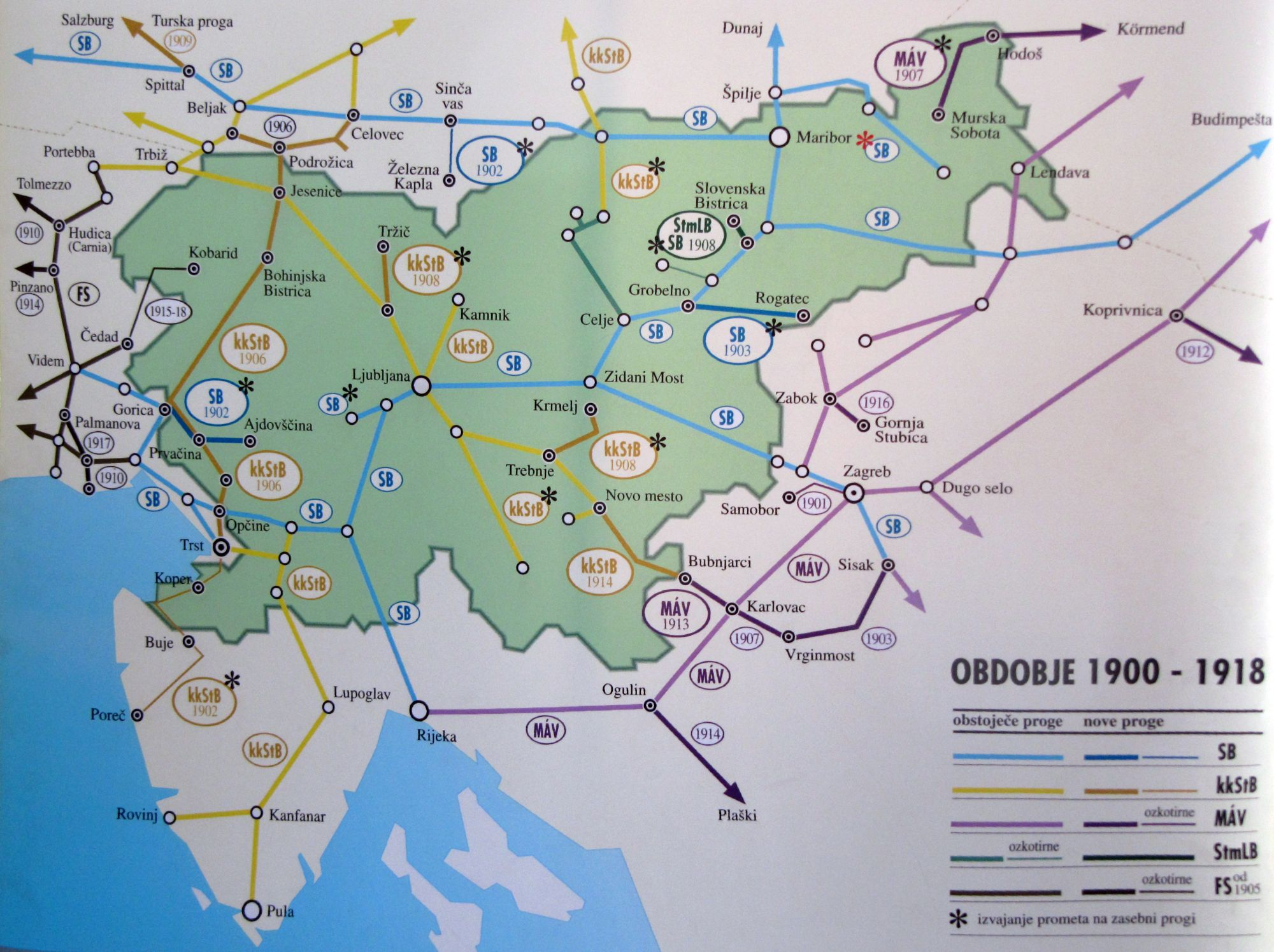
Railways in and around Slovenia by 1918

The history of rail transport in Slovenia dates back to 2 June 1846, the opening day of the Graz to Celje section of the Austrian Southern Railway. The events that day included the inaugural run of the first train to operate in Slovenia. The difficult and dangerous task of extending the line though challenging terrain to Ljubljana was completed by 1849. The line eventually continued to Trieste, now in Italy.

== See also ==
- History of rail transport
- History of Slovenia
- Narrow-gauge railways in Slovenia
- Slovenian Railways
