= Šorgi =

Šorgi Sorghi
- Village
- Location within Croatia
- Coordinates: 45.4137946°N 13.8180075°E
- Country: Croatia
- County: Istria County
- Municipality: Oprtalj

Area
  - Total: 3.0 sq mi (7.8 km^{2})

Population (2021)
  - Total: 34
  - Density: 11/sq mi (4.4/km^{2})
- Time zone: UTC+1 (CET)
  - Summer (DST): UTC+2 (CEST)
- Postal code: 52428 Oprtalj
- Area code: 052

Šorgi (Italian: Sorghi) is a village in the municipality of Oprtalj, Istria in Croatia.

== Demographics ==
According to the 2021 census, its population was 34.
