= Istarske Toplice =

Coordinates: 45°22′45″N 13°53′10″E

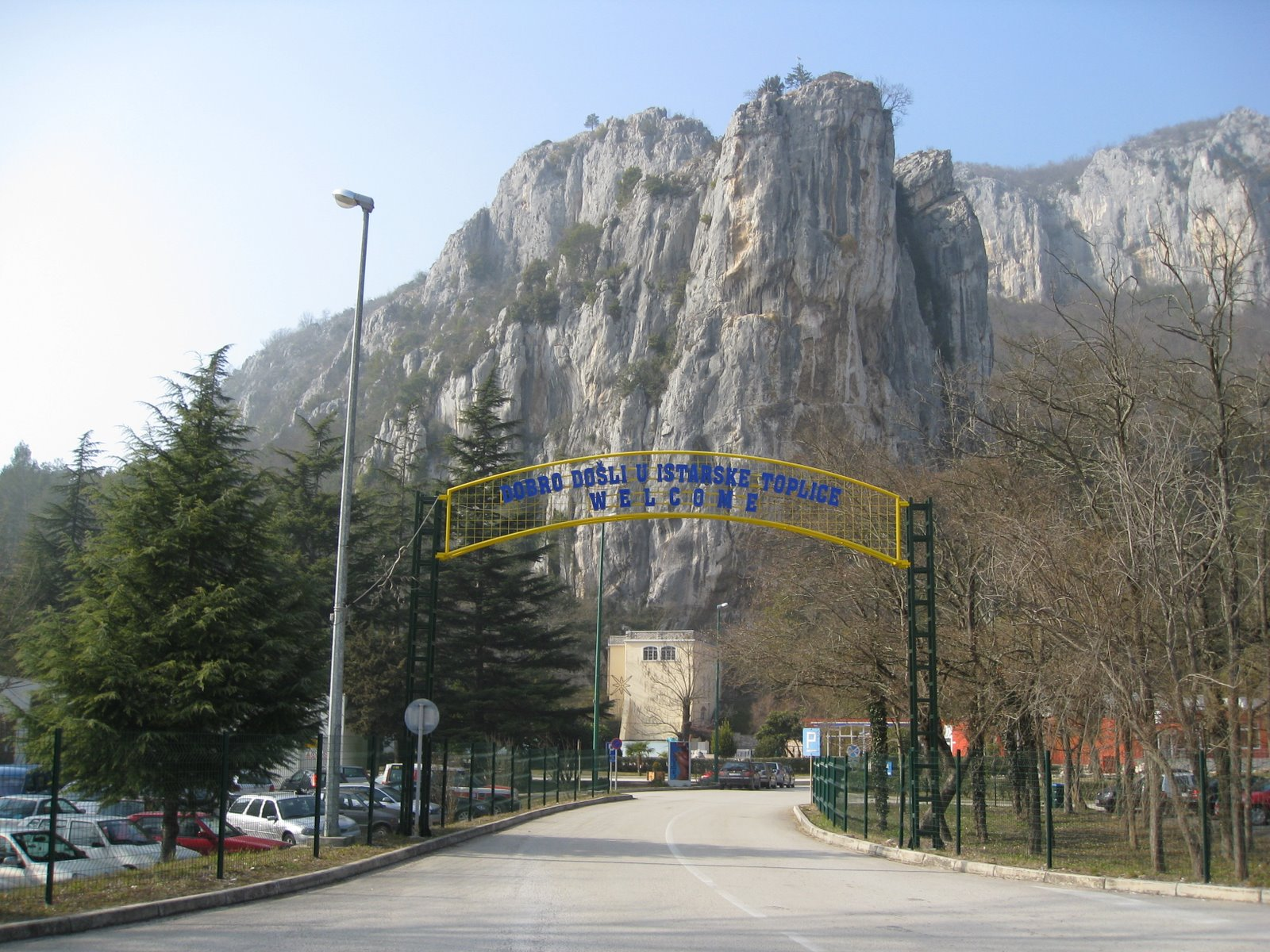
Istarske Toplice, entrance.

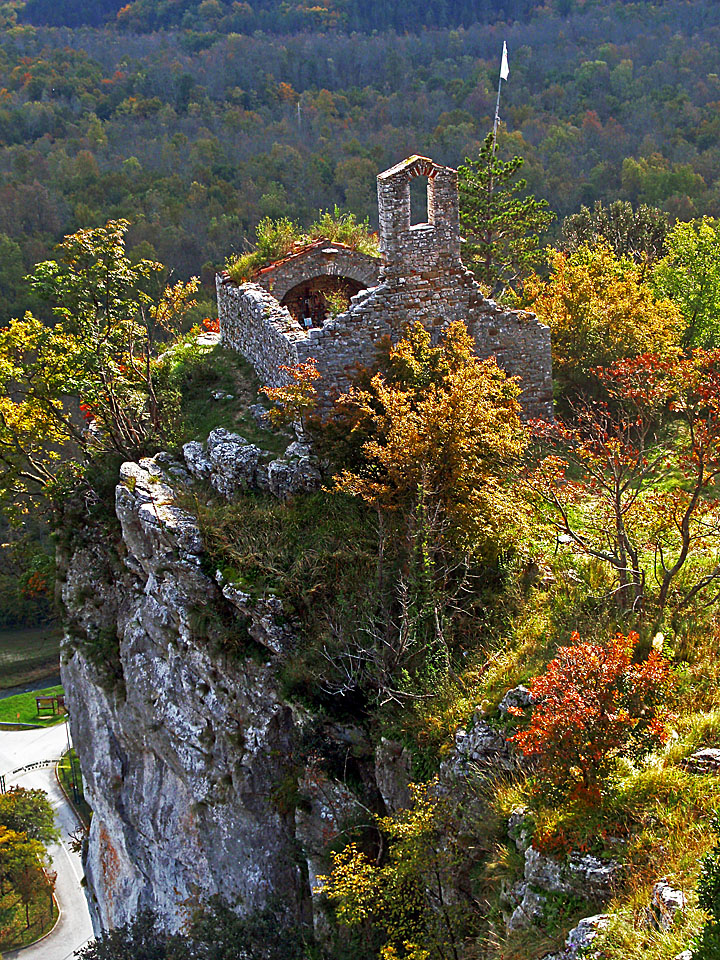
St. Stephen church ruine

Istarske Toplice (Croatian: Istarske toplice; Italian: Terme istriane), previously known as Terme Santo Stefano, is a thermal health resort in the central part of Istria, Croatia, in the village of Gradinje. It is located 11 kilometres southwest of town of Buzet, in the canyon part of the Mirna river.

== Sources ==
- "Istarske toplice". Istrapedia (in Croatian).
