= Narducci =

Narducci is an Italian surname. Notable people with the surname include:

- Francesco Narducci, a wealthy Perugian doctor, drowned in Lake Trasimeno in 1985, investigated with the Monster of Florence
- Kathrine Narducci (born 1965), American actress
- L. M. Narducci (1942–2006), Italian-American physicist
- Massimiliano Narducci (born 1964), Italian tennis player
- Roberto Narducci (1887–1979), Italian architect and engineer

== See also ==
- Nardozzi, surname
- Nardući, village in Croatia
- Narduzzi, surname
