= Bukori =

Bukori Bucori
- Village
- Location within Croatia
- Coordinates: 45°19′12″N 13°43′26″E
- Country: Croatia
- County: Istria County
- Municipality: Vižinada

Area
  - Total: 0.27 sq mi (0.7 km^{2})

Population (2021)
  - Total: 21
  - Density: 78/sq mi (30/km^{2})
- Time zone: UTC+1 (CET)
  - Summer (DST): UTC+2 (CEST)
- Postal code: 52447 Vižinada
- Area code: 052

Bukori (Italian: Bucori) is a village in Vižinada-Visinada municipality in Istria County, Croatia.

== Demographics ==
According to the 2021 census, its population was 21. It was 11 in 2001.
