= Zrenj =

Zrenj Stridone
- Village
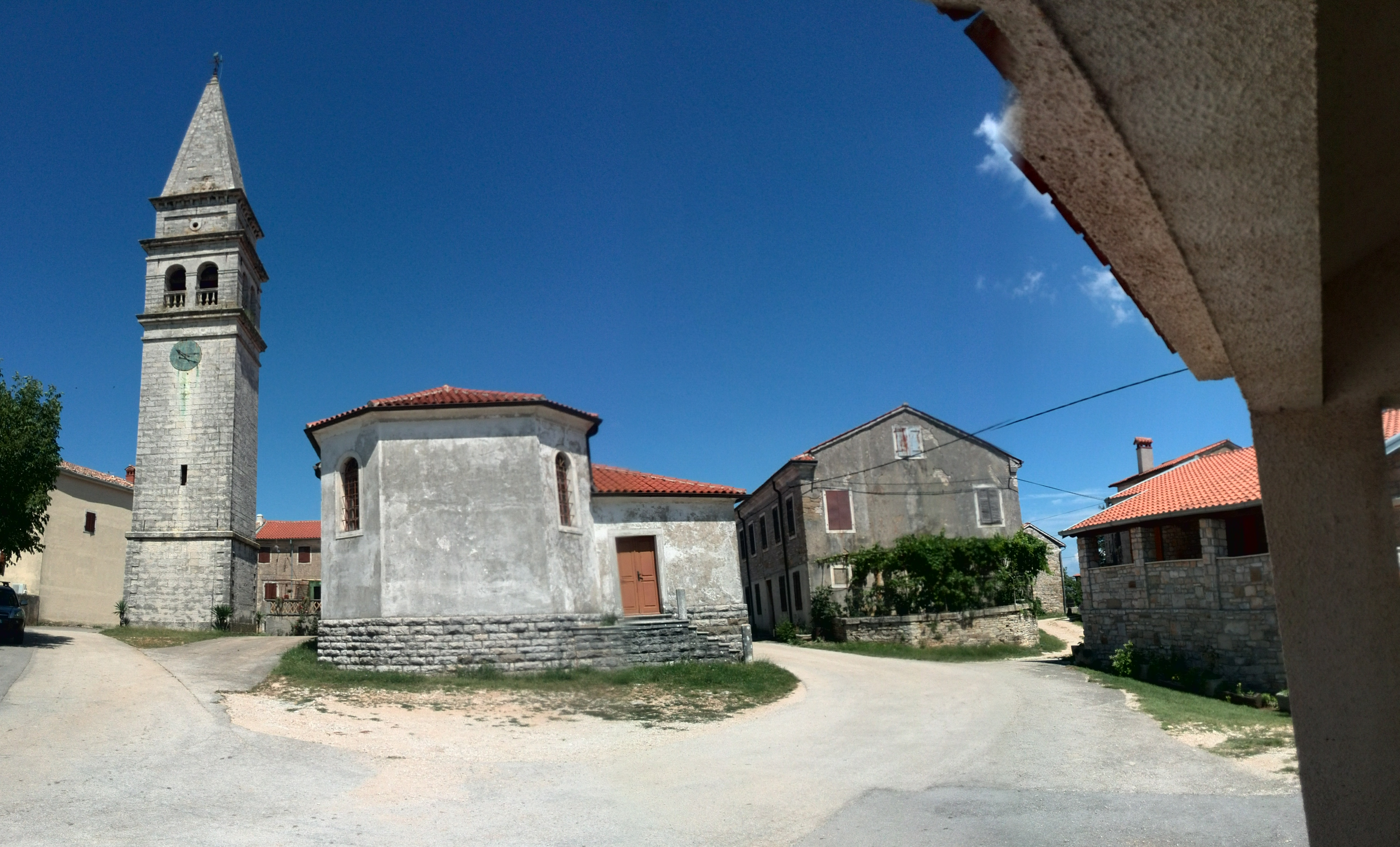

- Location within Croatia
- Coordinates: 45.4102976°N 13.8518786°E
- Country: Croatia
- County: Istria County
- Municipality: Oprtalj

Area
  - Total: 4.2 sq mi (11.0 km^{2})

Population (2021)
  - Total: 55
  - Density: 13/sq mi (5.0/km^{2})
- Time zone: UTC+1 (CET)
  - Summer (DST): UTC+2 (CEST)
- Postal code: 52428 Oprtalj
- Area code: 052

Zrenj (Italian: Stridone) is a village in the municipality of Oprtalj, Istria in Croatia.

== Demographics ==
According to the 2021 census, its population was 55.
