= Crklada =

Crklada Cerclada, Cerolada
- Village
- Location within Croatia
- Coordinates: 45°19′08″N 13°45′04″E
- Country: Croatia
- County: Istria County
- Municipality: Vižinada

Area
  - Total: 0.35 sq mi (0.9 km^{2})

Population (2021)
  - Total: 122
  - Density: 350/sq mi (140/km^{2})
- Time zone: UTC+1 (CET)
  - Summer (DST): UTC+2 (CEST)
- Postal code: 52447 Vižinada
- Area code: 052

Crklada (Italian: Cerclada, Cerolada) is a village in Vižinada-Visinada municipality in Istria County, Croatia.

== Demographics ==
According to the 2021 census, its population was 122. It was 114 in 2001.
