= Velići =

Velići Velli
- Village
- Location within Croatia
- Coordinates: 45°18′25″N 13°45′14″E
- Country: Croatia
- County: Istria County
- Municipality: Vižinada

Area
  - Total: 0.23 sq mi (0.6 km^{2})

Population (2021)
  - Total: 45
  - Density: 190/sq mi (75/km^{2})
- Time zone: UTC+1 (CET)
  - Summer (DST): UTC+2 (CEST)
- Postal code: 52447 Vižinada
- Area code: 052

Velići (Italian: Velli) is a village in Vižinada-Visinada municipality in Istria County, Croatia.

== Demographics ==
According to the 2021 census, its population was 45. It was 30 in 2001.
