= Ohnići =

Ohnići Ochinici
- Village
- Location within Croatia
- Coordinates: 45°18′40″N 13°42′50″E
- Country: Croatia
- County: Istria County
- Municipality: Vižinada

Area
  - Total: 0.12 sq mi (0.3 km^{2})

Population (2021)
  - Total: 30
  - Density: 260/sq mi (100/km^{2})
- Time zone: UTC+1 (CET)
  - Summer (DST): UTC+2 (CEST)
- Postal code: 52447 Vižinada
- Area code: 052

Ohnići (Italian: Ochinici) is a village in Vižinada municipality in Istria County, Croatia.

== Demographics ==
According to the 2021 census, its population was 30. It was 31 in 2001.
