= Narduzzi =

Narduzzi is a surname. Notable people with the surname include:

- Bill Narduzzi (1936–1988), American football player and coach
- Luigi Narduzzi (1932–1970), Italian fencer
- Pat Narduzzi (born 1966), American football coach and player
- Yves Narduzzi (born 1969), French slalom canoeist

== See also ==
- Nardozzi, surname
- Narducci, surname
