= Ferenci, Istria County =

Ferenci Ferenzi
- Village
- Location within Croatia
- Coordinates: 45°18′50″N 13°45′07″E
- Country: Croatia
- County: Istria County
- Municipality: Vižinada

Area
  - Total: 0.19 sq mi (0.5 km^{2})

Population (2021)
  - Total: 63
  - Density: 330/sq mi (130/km^{2})
- Time zone: UTC+1 (CET)
  - Summer (DST): UTC+2 (CEST)
- Postal code: 52447 Vižinada
- Area code: 052

Ferenci (Italian: Ferenzi) is a village in Vižinada-Visinada municipality in Istria County, Croatia.

== Demographics ==
According to the 2021 census, its population was 63. It was 89 in 2001.
