= Žnjidarići =

Žnjidarići Snidarici
- Village
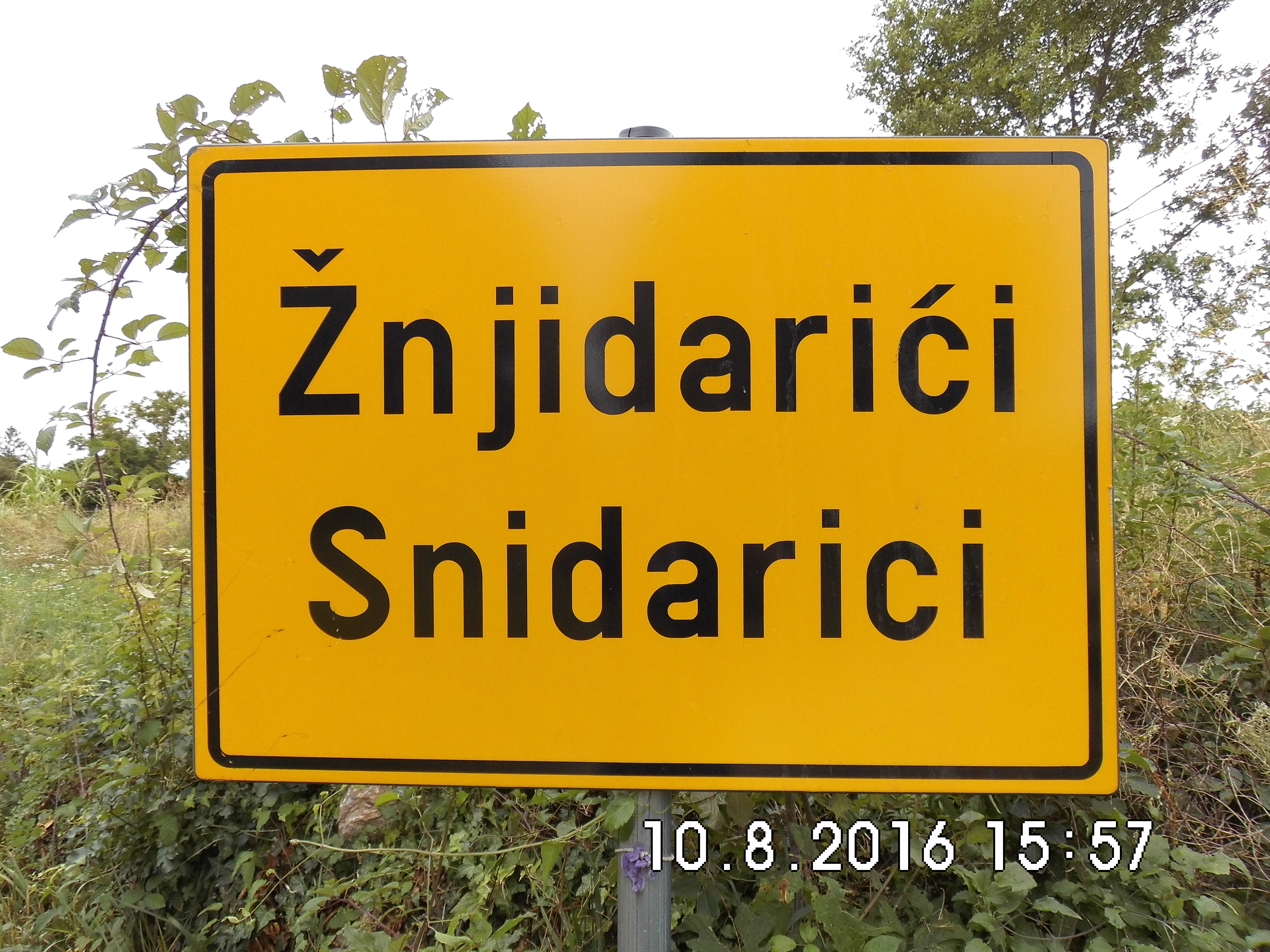

- Location within Croatia
- Coordinates: 45.3915423°N 13.8728947°E
- Country: Croatia
- County: Istria County
- Municipality: Oprtalj

Area
  - Total: 1.0 sq mi (2.6 km^{2})

Population (2021)
  - Total: 42
  - Density: 42/sq mi (16/km^{2})
- Time zone: UTC+1 (CET)
  - Summer (DST): UTC+2 (CEST)
- Postal code: 52428 Oprtalj
- Area code: 052

Žnjidarići (Italian: Snidarici) is a village in the municipality of Oprtalj, Istria in Croatia.

== Demographics ==
According to the 2021 census, its population was 42.
