= Vižintini =

Vižintini Visintini
- Village
- Location within Croatia
- Coordinates: 45.3879766°N 13.8556813°E
- Country: Croatia
- County: Istria County
- Municipality: Oprtalj

Area
  - Total: 0.69 sq mi (1.8 km^{2})

Population (2021)
  - Total: 24
  - Density: 35/sq mi (13/km^{2})
- Time zone: UTC+1 (CET)
  - Summer (DST): UTC+2 (CEST)
- Postal code: 52428 Oprtalj
- Area code: 052

Vižintini (Italian: Visintini) is a village in the municipality of Oprtalj, Istria, Croatia.

== Demographics ==
According to the 2021 census, its population was 24.
