= Sveti Ivan, Oprtalj =

Sveti Ivan San Giovanni
- Village
- Location within Croatia
- Coordinates: 45.3982793°N 13.791239°E
- Country: Croatia
- County: Istria County
- Municipality: Oprtalj

Area
  - Total: 1.0 sq mi (2.7 km^{2})

Population (2021)
  - Total: 38
  - Density: 36/sq mi (14/km^{2})
- Time zone: UTC+1 (CET)
  - Summer (DST): UTC+2 (CEST)
- Postal code: 52428 Oprtalj
- Area code: 052

Sveti Ivan (Italian: San Giovanni) is a village in the municipality of Oprtalj, Istria in Croatia.

== Demographics ==
According to the 2021 census, its population was 38.
