= Markovići (Vižinada) =

Markovići Marcovici
- Village
- Location within Croatia
- Coordinates: 45°19′41″N 13°43′48″E
- Country: Croatia
- County: Istria County
- Municipality: Vižinada

Area
  - Total: 0.15 sq mi (0.4 km^{2})

Population (2021)
  - Total: 50
  - Density: 320/sq mi (120/km^{2})
- Time zone: UTC+1 (CET)
  - Summer (DST): UTC+2 (CEST)
- Postal code: 52447 Vižinada
- Area code: 052

Markovići (Italian: Marcovici) is a village in Vižinada-Visinada municipality in Istria County, Croatia.

== Demographics ==
According to the 2021 census, its population was 50. It was 40 in 2001.
