= Mekiši kod Vižinade =

Mekiši kod Vižinade Mechissi
- Village
- Location within Croatia
- Coordinates: 45°18′32″N 13°45′04″E
- Country: Croatia
- County: Istria County
- Municipality: Vižinada

Area
  - Total: 0.15 sq mi (0.4 km^{2})

Population (2021)
  - Total: 37
  - Density: 240/sq mi (92/km^{2})
- Time zone: UTC+1 (CET)
  - Summer (DST): UTC+2 (CEST)
- Postal code: 52447 Vižinada
- Area code: 052

Mekiši kod Vižinade (Italian: Mechissi) is a village in Vižinada-Visinada municipality in Istria County, Croatia.

== Demographics ==
According to the 2021 census, its population was 37. It was 33 in 2001.
