= Nardozzi =

Nardozzi is a surname. Notable people with the surname include:

- Rachel Ann Bovier, f.k.a. Billie Nardozzi
- Cristina Nardozzi (born 1983), American model, actress, television personality, and beauty pageant titleholder
- Deborah Nardozzi, American political consultant and politician
- Severino Nardozzi (born 1946), Italian racing driver

== See also ==
- Narducci, surname
- Narduzzi, surname
