= Livade, Croatia =

Livade Levade
- Village
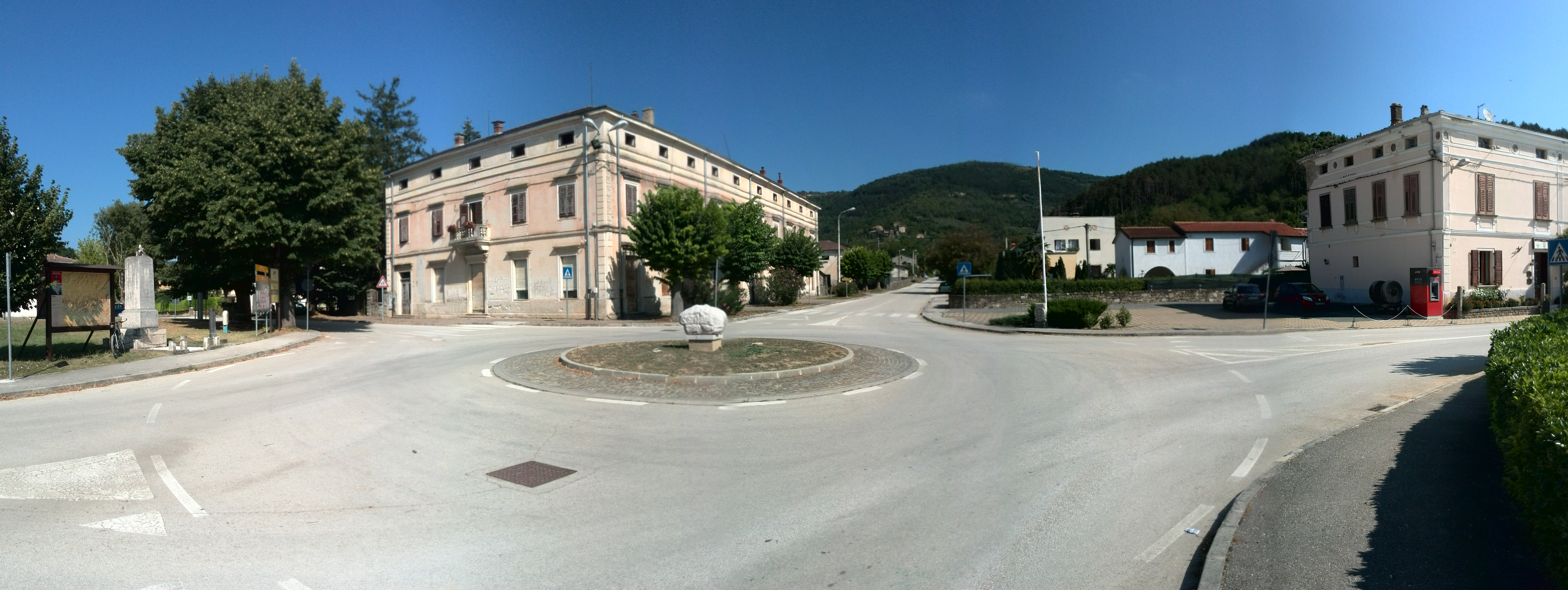

- Location within Croatia
- Coordinates: 45.354944°N 13.829077°E
- Country: Croatia
- County: Istria County
- Municipality: Oprtalj

Area
  - Total: 0.85 sq mi (2.2 km^{2})

Population (2021)
  - Total: 169
  - Density: 200/sq mi (77/km^{2})
- Time zone: UTC+1 (CET)
  - Summer (DST): UTC+2 (CEST)
- Postal code: 52427 Livade
- Area code: 052

Livade (Italian: Levade) is a village located near Oprtalj and Motovun, in Istria, Croatia.

The spa Istarske Toplice is located in Livade.

== Demographics ==
According to the 2021 census, its population was 169. It was 190 in 2011.
