= Golubići, Istria County =

Golubići Golobici
- Village
- Location within Croatia
- Coordinates: 45.360461°N 13.8333615°E
- Country: Croatia
- County: Istria County
- Municipality: Oprtalj

Area
  - Total: 0.85 sq mi (2.2 km^{2})

Population (2021)
  - Total: 23
  - Density: 27/sq mi (10/km^{2})
- Time zone: UTC+1 (CET)
  - Summer (DST): UTC+2 (CEST)
- Postal code: 52427 Livade
- Area code: 052

Golubići (Italian: Golobici) is a village in the municipality of Oprtalj, Istria in Croatia.

== Demographics ==
According to the 2021 census, its population was 23.
