= Vranje Selo =

Vranje Selo Vragnasello, Vernisello
- Village
- Location within Croatia
- Coordinates: 45°20′02″N 13°43′59″E
- Country: Croatia
- County: Istria County
- Municipality: Vižinada

Area
  - Total: 0.35 sq mi (0.9 km^{2})

Population (2021)
  - Total: 48
  - Density: 140/sq mi (53/km^{2})
- Time zone: UTC+1 (CET)
  - Summer (DST): UTC+2 (CEST)
- Postal code: 52447 Vižinada
- Area code: 052

Vranje Selo (Italian: Vragnasello, Vernisello) is a village in Vižinada-Visinada municipality in Istria County, Croatia.

== Demographics ==
According to the 2021 census, its population was 48. It was 54 in 2001.
