= Grubići =

Grubići Grubissi
- Village
- Location within Croatia
- Coordinates: 45°19′05″N 13°45′22″E
- Country: Croatia
- County: Istria County
- Municipality: Vižinada

Area
  - Total: 0.42 sq mi (1.1 km^{2})

Population (2021)
  - Total: 37
  - Density: 87/sq mi (34/km^{2})
- Time zone: UTC+1 (CET)
  - Summer (DST): UTC+2 (CEST)
- Postal code: 52447 Vižinada
- Area code: 052

Grubići (Italian: Grubissi) is a village in Vižinada-Visinada municipality in Istria County, Croatia.

== Demographics ==
According to the 2021 census, its population was 37. It was 32 in 2001.
