= Čepić =

Čepić Ceppich
- Village
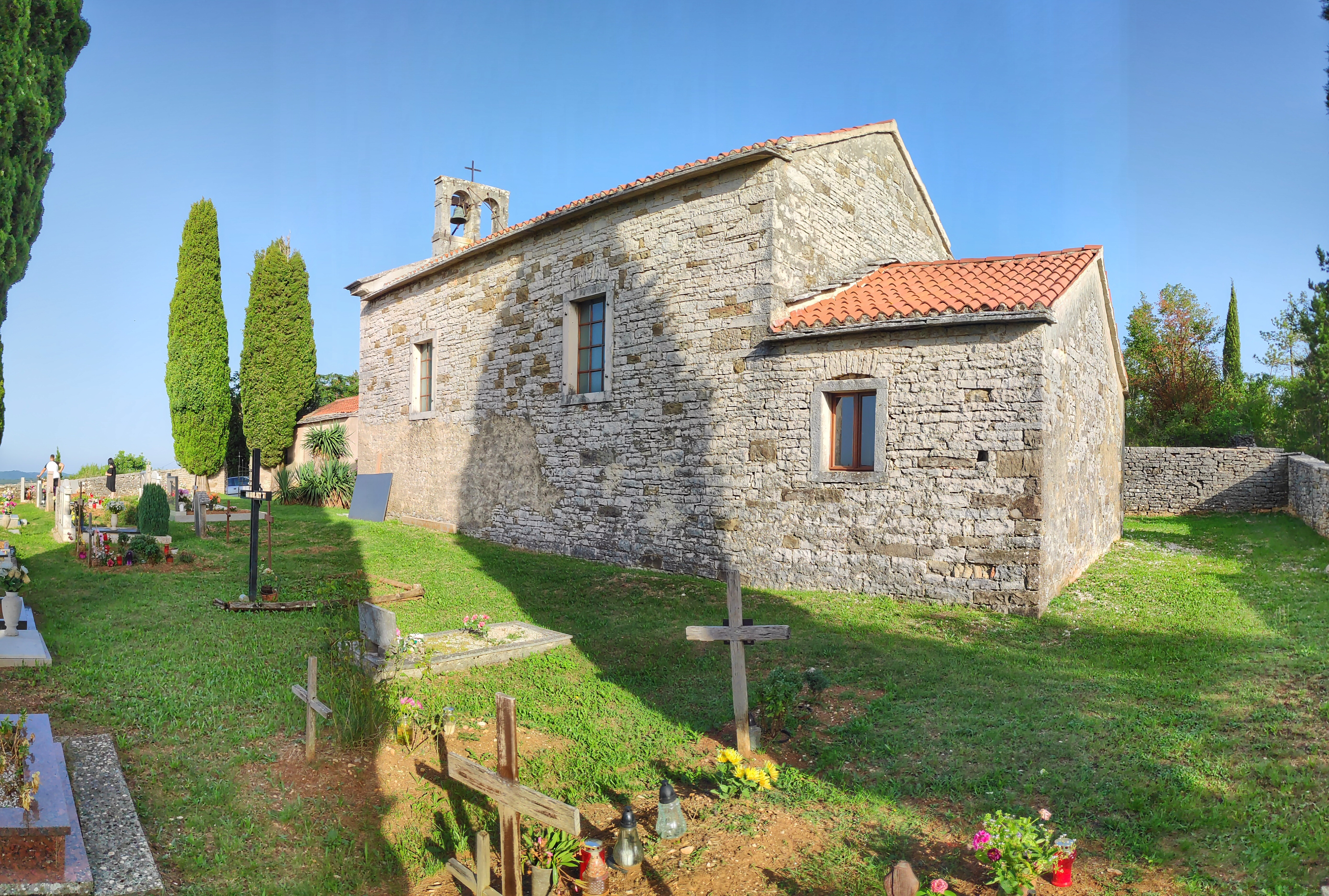

- Location within Croatia
- Coordinates: 45°25′01″N 13°48′45″E
- Country: Croatia
- County: Istria County
- Municipality: Oprtalj

Area
  - Total: 2.3 sq mi (6.0 km^{2})
- Elevation: 1,273 ft (388 m)

Population (2021)
  - Total: 52
  - Density: 22/sq mi (8.7/km^{2})
- Time zone: UTC+1 (CET)
  - Summer (DST): UTC+2 (CEST)
- Postal code: 52428 Oprtalj
- Area code: 052

Čepić or Cepich is a village in Istria, Croatia. The name is also spelled Ceppi, Cepic, Čepich, or Ceppich.

== Climate ==
Since records began in 1981, the highest temperature recorded at the local weather station was 40.0 °C (104.0 °F), on 3 August 2017. The coldest temperature was −17.6 °C (0.3 °F), on 8 January 1985.

== Demographics ==
According to the 2021 census, its population was 52. In 2011 it was 57.

Population number according to the census
1857	1869	1880	1890	1900	1910	1921	1931	1948	1953	1961	1971	1981	1991	2001	2011
201	213	190	233	234	245	246	250	241	217	172	117	98	77	60	57

== See also ==
- List of Glagolitic inscriptions (16th century)

== Bibliography ==
=== Biology ===
- Šašić, Martina; Nahirnić, Ana; Tarmann, Gerhard M. (2016-12-31). "Zygaenidae (Lepidoptera) in the Lepidoptera collections of the Croatian Natural History Museum". Natura Croatica: Periodicum Musei Historiae Naturalis Croatici. 25 (2): 233–248. doi:10.20302/NC.2016.25.19. eISSN 1848-7386.
