= Brig, Istria County =

Brig Monteritossa
- Village
- Location within Croatia
- Coordinates: 45°18′22″N 13°46′16″E
- Country: Croatia
- County: Istria County
- Municipality: Vižinada

Area
  - Total: 1.2 sq mi (3.1 km^{2})

Population (2021)
  - Total: 109
  - Density: 91/sq mi (35/km^{2})
- Time zone: UTC+1 (CET)
  - Summer (DST): UTC+2 (CEST)
- Postal code: 52447 Vižinada
- Area code: 052

Brig (Italian: Monteritossa) is a village in Vižinada-Visinada municipality in Istria County, Croatia.

== Demographics ==
According to the 2023 census, its population was 107. It was 115 in 2001.
