= Jadruhi =

Jadruhi Iadrucchi
- Village
- Location within Croatia
- Coordinates: 45°18′04″N 13°45′00″E
- Country: Croatia
- County: Istria County
- Municipality: Vižinada

Area
  - Total: 0.46 sq mi (1.2 km^{2})

Population (2021)
  - Total: 54
  - Density: 120/sq mi (45/km^{2})
- Time zone: UTC+1 (CET)
  - Summer (DST): UTC+2 (CEST)
- Postal code: 52447 Vižinada
- Area code: 052

Jadruhi (Italian: Iadrucchi) is a village in Vižinada-Visinada municipality in Istria County, Croatia.

== Demographics ==
According to the 2021 census, its population was 54. It was 56 in 2001.
