= Filipi =

Filipi Filippi
- Village
- Location within Croatia
- Coordinates: 45°13′16″N 13°40′17″E
- Country: Croatia
- County: Istria County
- Municipality: Vižinada

Area
  - Total: 0.23 sq mi (0.6 km^{2})

Population (2021)
  - Total: 28
  - Density: 120/sq mi (47/km^{2})
- Time zone: UTC+1 (CET)
  - Summer (DST): UTC+2 (CEST)
- Postal code: 52447 Vižinada
- Area code: 052

Filipi (Italian: Filippi) is a village in Vižinada-Visinada municipality in Istria County, Croatia.

== Demographics ==
According to the 2021 census, its population was 28. It was 36 in 2001.
