= Pirelići =

Pirelići Perelici
- Village
- Location within Croatia
- Coordinates: 45.3556979°N 13.7972165°E
- Country: Croatia
- County: Istria County
- Municipality: Oprtalj

Area
  - Total: 1.0 sq mi (2.6 km^{2})

Population (2021)
  - Total: 47
  - Density: 47/sq mi (18/km^{2})
- Time zone: UTC+1 (CET)
  - Summer (DST): UTC+2 (CEST)
- Postal code: 52427 Livade
- Area code: 052

Pirelići (Italian: Perelici) is a village in the municipality of Oprtalj, Istria in Croatia.

== Demographics ==
According to the 2021 census, its population was 47.
