= Lašići =

Lašići Lassici
- Village
- Location within Croatia
- Coordinates: 45°18′54″N 13°43′37″E
- Country: Croatia
- County: Istria County
- Municipality: Vižinada

Area
  - Total: 0.69 sq mi (1.8 km^{2})

Population (2021)
  - Total: 44
  - Density: 63/sq mi (24/km^{2})
- Time zone: UTC+1 (CET)
  - Summer (DST): UTC+2 (CEST)
- Postal code: 52447 Vižinada
- Area code: 052

Lašići (Italian: Lassici) is a village in Vižinada-Visinada municipality in Istria County, Croatia.

== Demographics ==
According to the 2021 census, its population was 44. It was 37 in 2001.
