= Sveta Lucija, Croatia =

Sveta Lucija Santa Lucia
- Village
- Location within Croatia
- Coordinates: 45.3949464°N 13.8121755°E
- Country: Croatia
- County: Istria County
- Municipality: Oprtalj

Area
  - Total: 2.6 sq mi (6.7 km^{2})

Population (2021)
  - Total: 37
  - Density: 14/sq mi (5.5/km^{2})
- Time zone: UTC+1 (CET)
  - Summer (DST): UTC+2 (CEST)
- Postal code: Sveta Lucija
- Area code: 052

Sveta Lucija (Italian: Santa Lucia) is a village in the municipality of Oprtalj, Istria in Croatia.

== Demographics ==
According to the 2021 census, its population was 37.
