= Gradinje, Oprtalj =

Gradinje Gradigne
- Village
- Location within Croatia
- Coordinates: 45.3730097°N 13.8503196°E
- Country: Croatia
- County: Istria County
- Municipality: Oprtalj

Area
  - Total: 1.4 sq mi (3.7 km^{2})

Population (2021)
  - Total: 109
  - Density: 76/sq mi (29/km^{2})
- Time zone: UTC+1 (CET)
  - Summer (DST): UTC+2 (CEST)
- Postal code: 52427 Livade
- Area code: 052

Gradinje is a village in the municipality of Oprtalj, Istria in Croatia.

== Demographics ==
According to the 2021 census, its population was 109.
