= Nardući =

Nardući Narducci
- Village
- Location within Croatia
- Coordinates: 45°21′00″N 13°43′15″E
- Country: Croatia
- County: Istria County
- Municipality: Vižinada

Area
  - Total: 1.2 sq mi (3.1 km^{2})

Population (2021)
  - Total: 14
  - Density: 12/sq mi (4.5/km^{2})
- Time zone: UTC+1 (CET)
  - Summer (DST): UTC+2 (CEST)
- Postal code: 52447 Vižinada
- Area code: 052

Nardući (Italian: Narducci) is a village in Vižinada-Visinada municipality in Istria County, Croatia. It is approximately 250 kilometres west of the capital Zagreb.

== Demographics ==
According to the 2021 census, its population was 14. It was 22 in 2001.
