= Vižinada =

Vižinada Visinada
- Municipality
- Vižinada Municipality; Općina Vižinada - Comune di Visinada
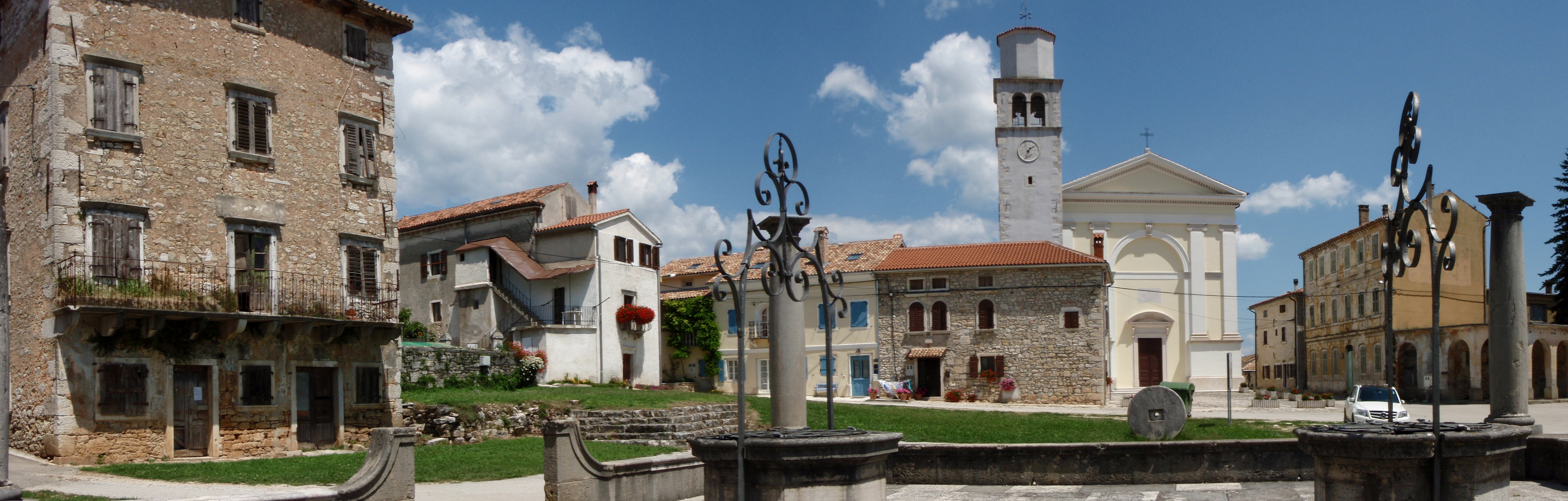
- Panorama of town centre

- Flag

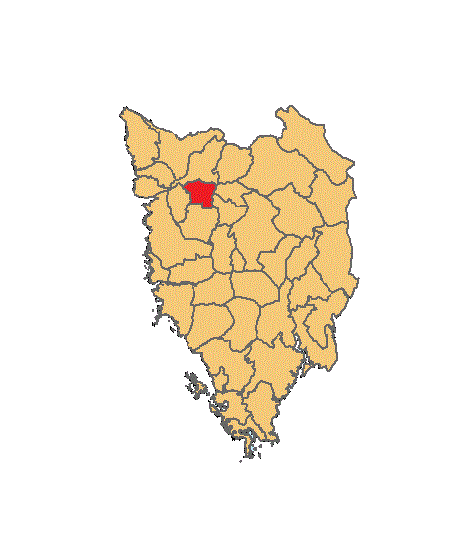
- Location of Vižinada in Istria
- Interactive map of Vižinada
- Location within Croatia
- Coordinates: 45°20′N 13°46′E
- Country: Croatia
- County: Istria County

Government
  - Mayor: Marko Ferenac

Area
  - Municipality: 35.7 km^{2} (13.8 sq mi)
  - Urban: 2.8 km^{2} (1.1 sq mi)
- Elevation: 40 m (130 ft)

Population (2021)
  - Municipality: 1,142
  - Density: 32.0/km^{2} (82.9/sq mi)
  - Urban: 269
  - Urban density: 96/km^{2} (250/sq mi)
- Time zone: UTC+1 (CET)
  - Summer (DST): UTC+2 (CEST)
- Postal code: 52440 Poreč
- Website: vizinada.hr

Vižinada ( Italian: Visinada) is a village and municipality in the interior of the western part of Istria, west Croatia. It is 17 kilometres (11 mi) northeast of Poreč-Parenzo at an elevation of 400 metres (1,300 ft). The economy is agriculture-based.

== History and culture ==
The parish was first mentioned in 1177, in the papal document granting a privilege to the bishop of Poreč. Vižinada is located at the intersection of the main road Buje - Pula (M2, E751) and a local road toward Poreč.

Despite various attempts at defacing stone effigies of the Lion of St Mark in the square and church interior, the township and its environs were under Venetian control at various periods throughout history.

Traditional events are Versi na sterni, festival of poetry, as well as the folk feasts of Krostulijada, St. Mary and St. Valentine.

The ballet story of Giselle was created in Vižinada. There is also the Gothic church of St. Mary with a stone head on the facade which, according to legend, depicts Attila, the Hun general.

== Demographics ==
According to the 2021 census, its population was 1,142 with 269 living in the village of Vižinada itself. The municipality consists of the following 27 settlements:

- Bajkini, population 37
- Baldaši, population 36
- Brig, population 109
- Bukori, population 21
- Crklada, population 122
- Čuki, population 6
- Danci, population 17
- Ferenci, population 63
- Filipi, population 28
- Grubići, population 37
- Jadruhi, population 54
- Lašići, population 44
- Markovići, population 50
- Mastelići, population 0
- Mekiši kod Vižinade, population 37
- Nardući, population 14
- Ohnići, population 30
- Piškovica, population 0
- Staniši, population 14
- Trombal, population 0
- Velići, population 45
- Vižinada, population 269
- Vranići kod Vižinade, population 0
- Vranje Selo, population 48
- Vrbani, population 8
- Vrh Lašići, population 44
- Žudetići, population 9
Vižinada: Population trends 1857–2021
v

population	2061	2272	2177	2394	2643	2786	3523	3753	2768	1961	1760	1350	1268	1150	1137	1158	1142
	1857	1869	1880	1890	1900	1910	1921	1931	1948	1953	1961	1971	1981	1991	2001	2011	2021

Sources: Croatian Bureau of Statistics publications

=== Languages ===
Although though the Government of the Republic of Croatia does not guarantee official Croatian-Italian bilinguialism here, the statute of Vižinada itself does.

== In popular culture ==
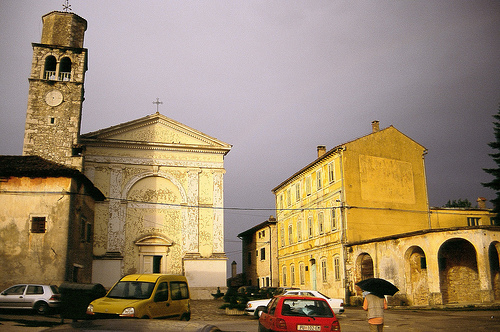
Vizinada's square where the climax of Kelly's Heroes was filmed.

In 1969, various locations in Vižinada were used as sets during the filming of the heist film Kelly's Heroes; the village was used as a stand-in for the French town of Clermont, with the script having a German-held bank full of gold bullion being up for grabs. Yugoslavia itself had been chosen for a shooting location for, among other reasons, that at the time it was one of the few nations whose army still possessed operational WWII-era tanks and other vehicles suitable for use in the film. Vižinada today remains mostly the same as it was in the production, as seen in the photograph of the church square, in which the confrontation with the Tiger tank takes place.

The photograph (right) shows Vižinada as seen in the film. The church tower is where the characters Cowboy (Jeff Morris) and Gutowski (Richard Davalos) are positioned, overlooking the town square, and the bank. To the right of the photograph, where the gentleman is standing, the Tiger Tank was sitting, as the three men (Kelly, Oddball and Big Joe) approached it to confront the commander.
