= Oprtalj =

Oprtalj Portole
- Municipality
- Oprtalj Municipality; Općina Oprtalj - Comune di Portole
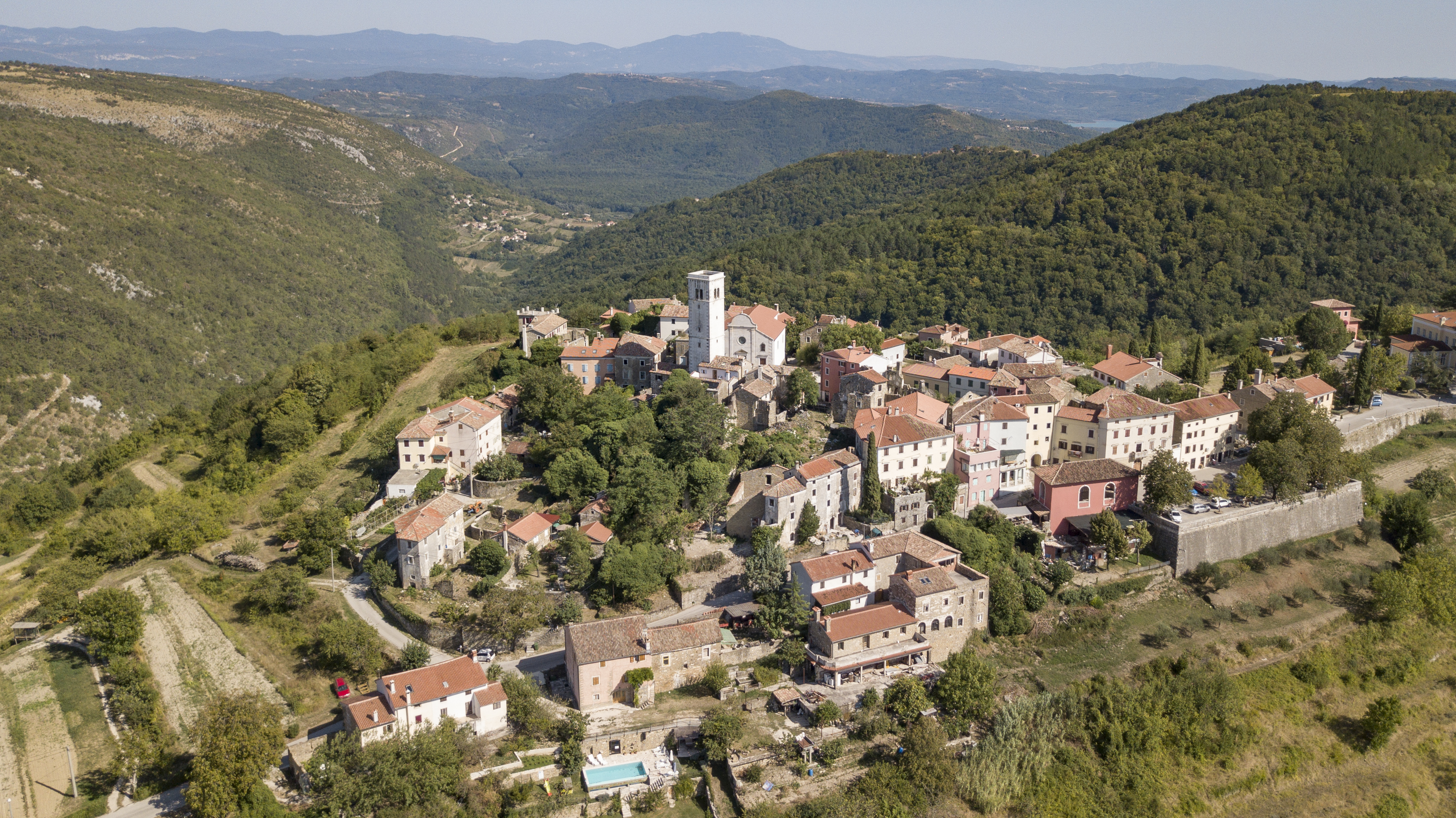
- Oprtalj, panoramic view

- Flag
- Interactive map of Oprtalj
- Location within Croatia
- Coordinates: 45°23′N 13°50′E
- Country: Croatia
- County: Istria County

Government
  - Mayor: Aleksandar Krt

Area
  - Municipality: 60.3 km^{2} (23.3 sq mi)
  - Urban: 4.4 km^{2} (1.7 sq mi)

Population (2021)
  - Municipality: 748
  - Density: 12.4/km^{2} (32.1/sq mi)
  - Urban: 75
  - Urban density: 17/km^{2} (44/sq mi)
- Time zone: UTC+1 (CET)
  - Summer (DST): UTC+2 (CEST)
- Postal code: 52460 Buje
- Area code: 052
- Website: oprtalj.hr

Oprtalj (Italian: Portole) is a village and municipality in Istria, Croatia. Oprtalj is a community in the central northern part of Istria County, situated across the Mirna river valley from the village of Motovun, about 20 km northwest of Pazin.

Oprtalj used to be a fortress surrounded by walls. In front of the former door, there is a large Venetian loggia with a lapidary.

== Demographics ==
According to the 2021 census, its population was 748, with 75 living in the village of Oprtalj itself.

The municipality consists of the following settlements:

- Bencani, population 5
- Čepić, population 52
- Golubići, population 23
- Gradinje, population 109
- Ipši, population 17
- Krajići, population 8
- Livade, population 169
- Oprtalj, population 75
- Pirelići, population 47
- Sveta Lucija, population 37
- Sveti Ivan, population 38
- Šorgi, population 34
- Vižintini, population 24
- Vižintini Vrhi, population 13
- Zrenj, population 55
- Žnjidarići, population 42
Oprtalj: Population trends 1857–2021
v

| population | 3678 | 3896 | 3895 | 4198 | 4232 | 4649 | 4524 | 4382 | 3803 | 3186 | 2220 | 1500 | 1255 | 1109 | 981 | 850 | 748 |
| | 1857 | 1869 | 1880 | 1890 | 1900 | 1910 | 1921 | 1931 | 1948 | 1953 | 1961 | 1971 | 1981 | 1991 | 2001 | 2011 | 2021 |

Sources: Croatian Bureau of Statistics publications

== Gallery ==
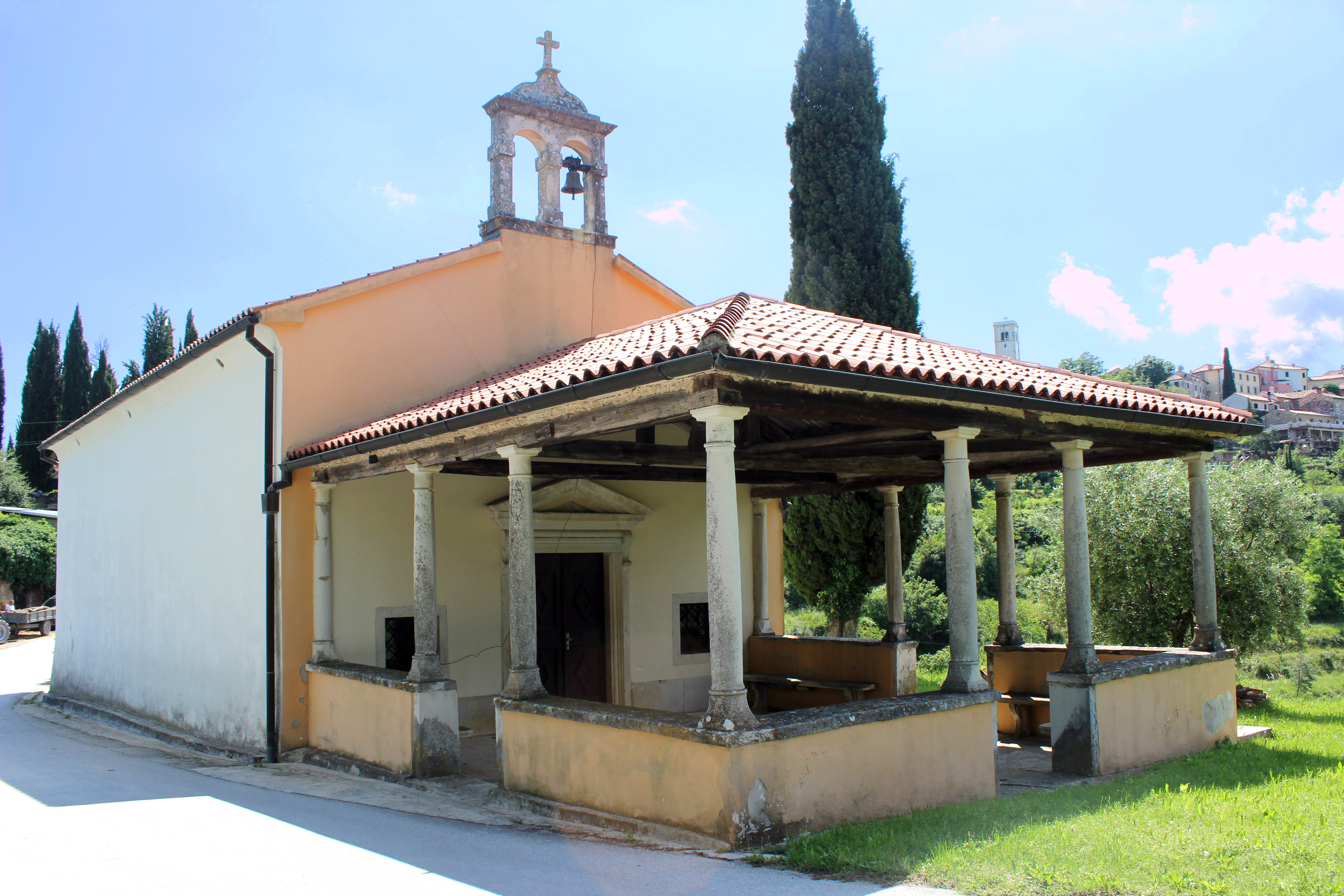
Church of Our Lady of the Greeks

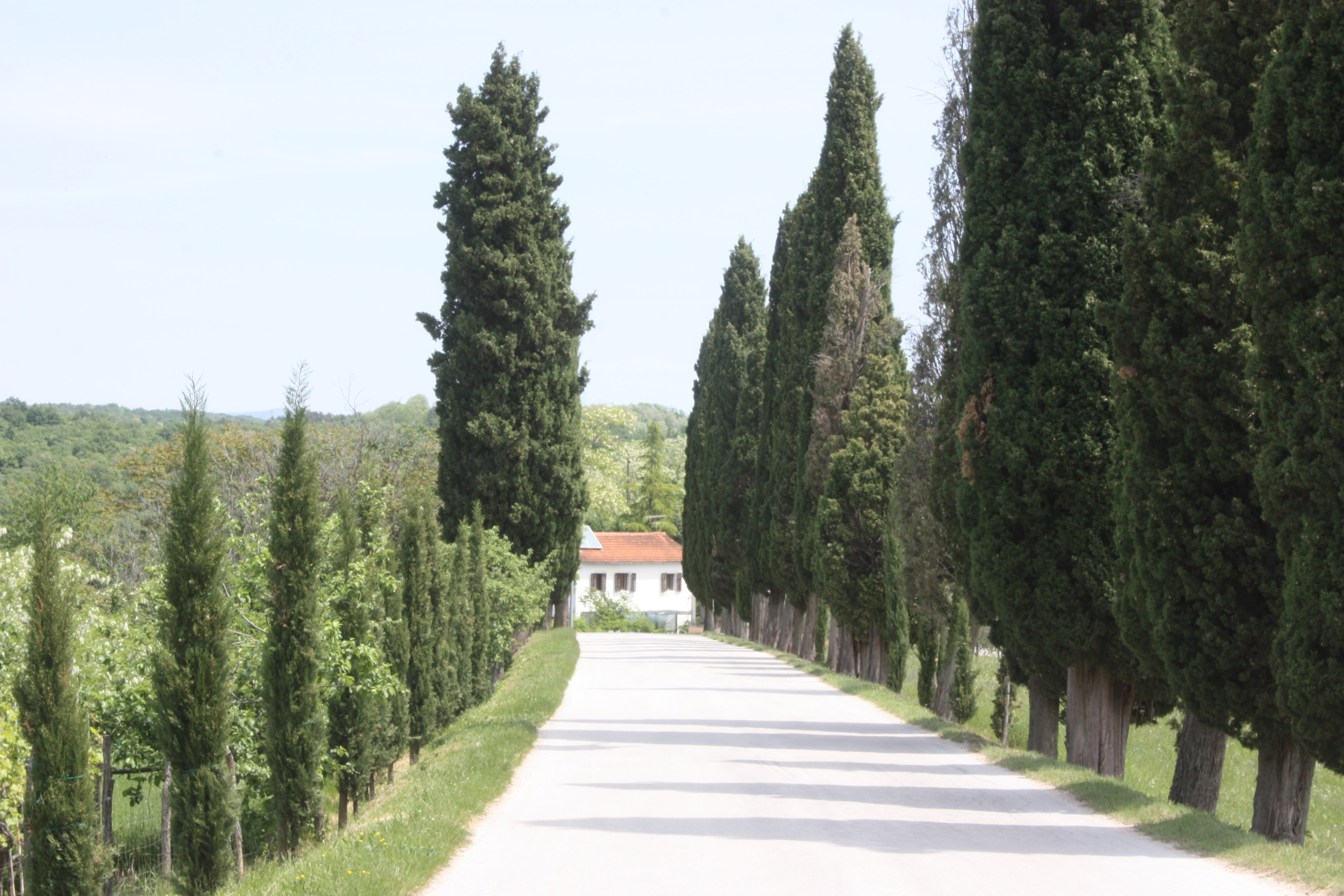
Oprtalj cypress tree-lined road

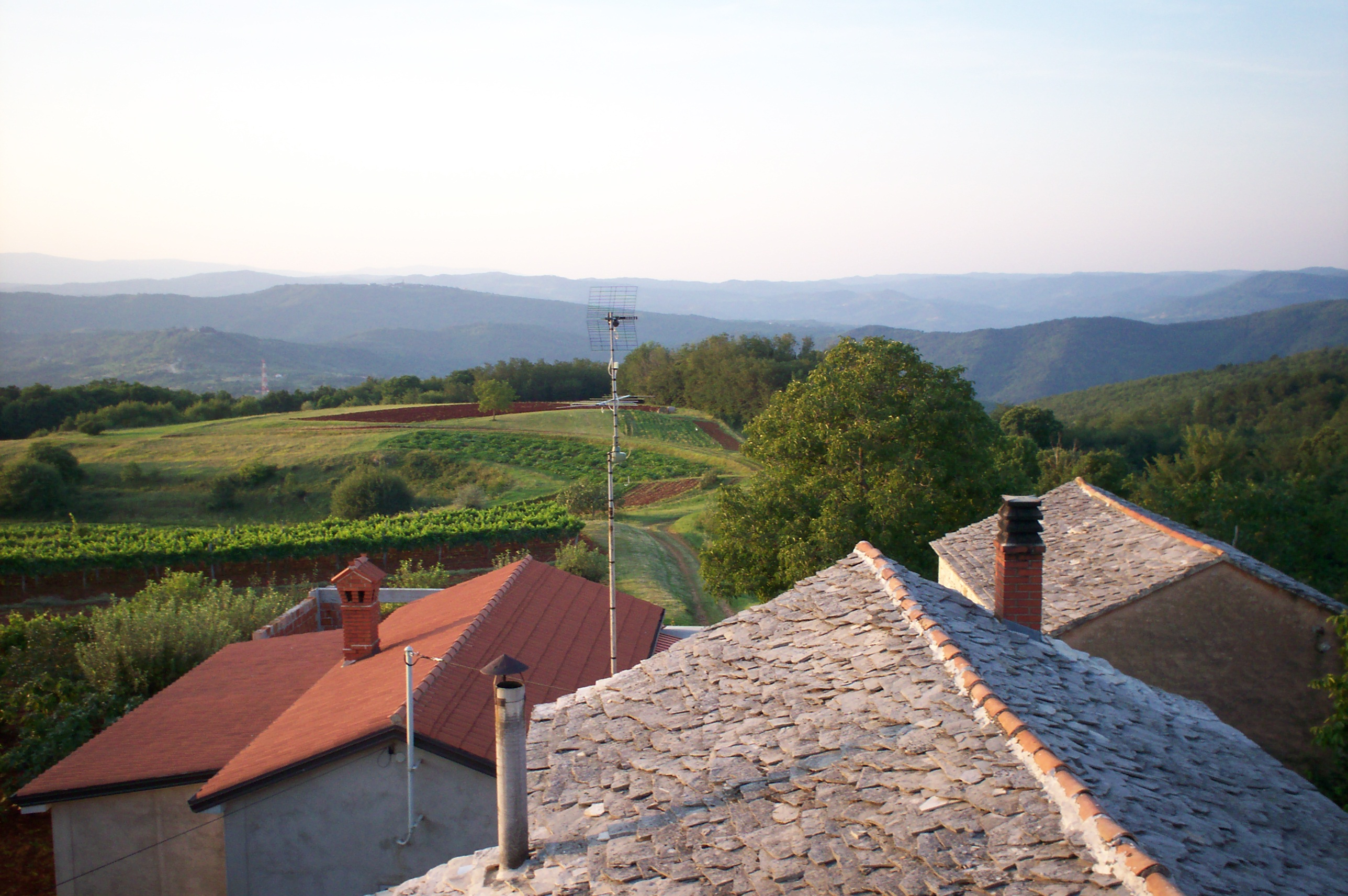
Čabrnica/Zabarnizza

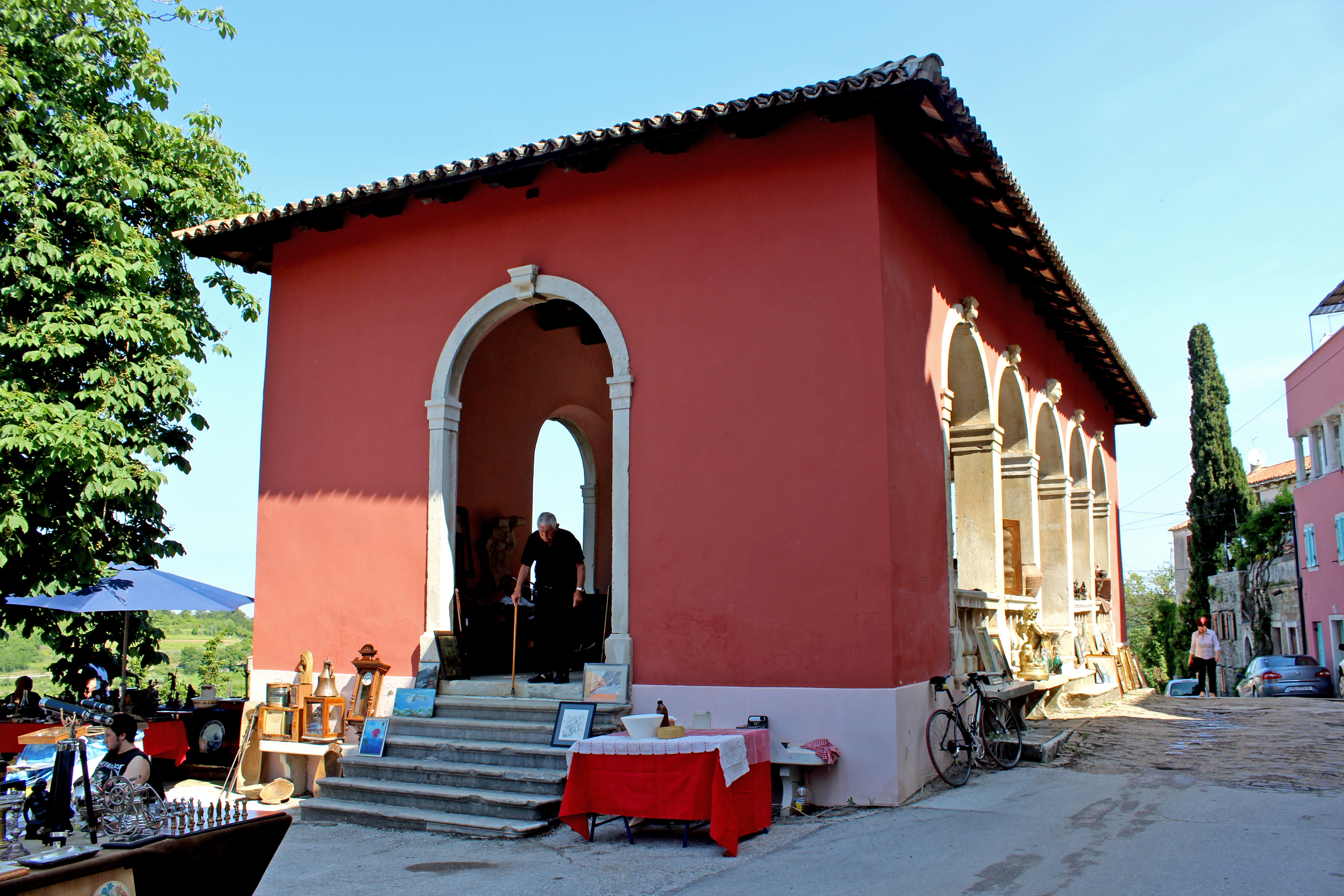
Oprtalj Loggia

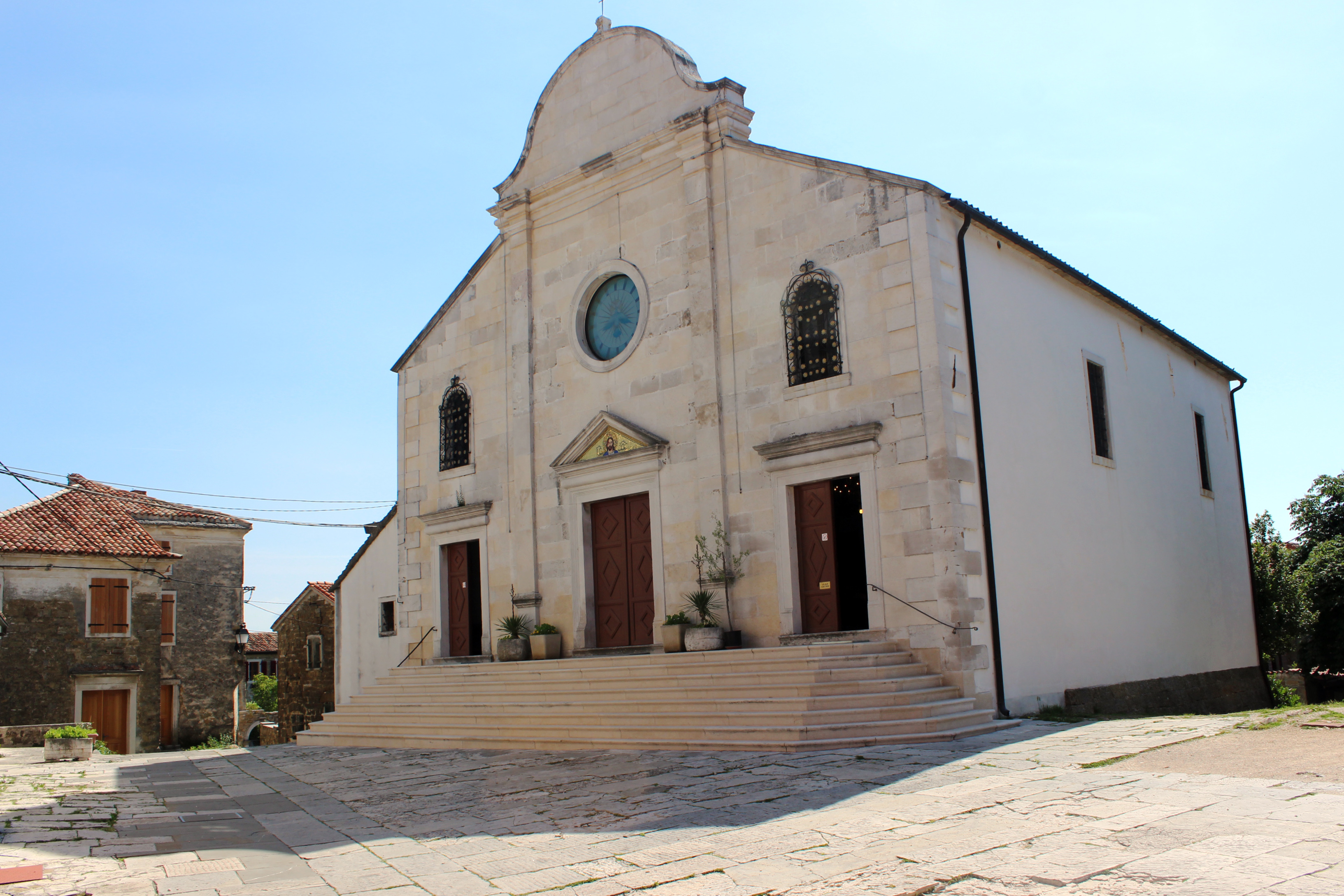
Church of Saint George
