= Trams in Ljubljana =

Transportation system in Slovenian city

Coordinates: 46°3′15.94″N 14°30′16.22″E

Ljubljana Tramway
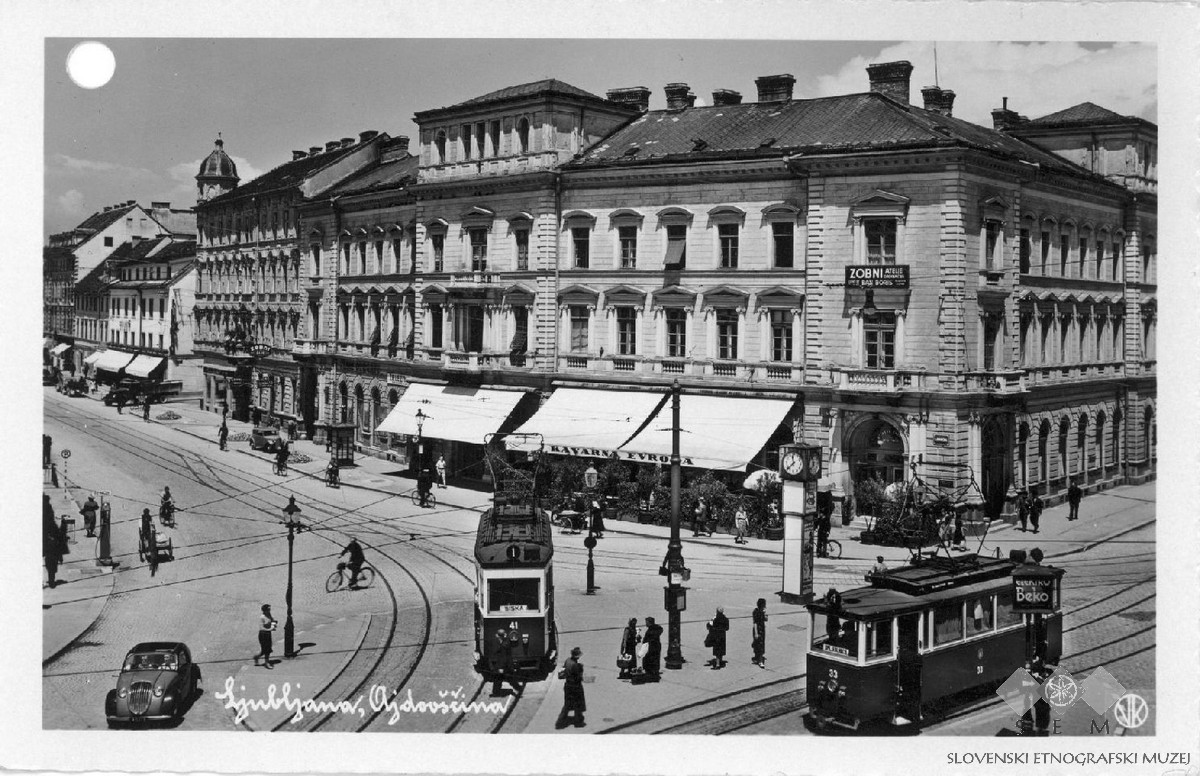
- Trams on Tavčar palace featured on a postcard

Operation
- Locale: Ljubljana, Slovenia
- Open: 6 September 1901
- Close: 20 December 1958
- Status: Closed
- Routes: 4
- Operator: Električna cestna železnica

Infrastructure
- Track gauge: 1,000 mm (3 ft 3 3/8 in)
- Electrification: 500 V DC
- Depot: 1
- Stock: 53 motor cars and 19 trailers

Statistics
- Route length: 21 km (13 mi)

The oldest preserved film recordings of Ljubljana, with a depiction of the Ljubljana tram (at 1:35 and 2:50), streets, and a celebration. Salvatore Spina Company, Trieste, 1909.

The tram system in Ljubljana, the capital of Slovenia, was originally built in 1901 and was operated until 1958. Slovenia was then part of Austria-Hungary and Yugoslavia, respectively. Work started in 1900 and the tram was put in use after postponements and without a special ceremony on 6 September 1901. The tram system's end came on 20 December 1958, when it was replaced in a ceremony by 12 buses.

== History ==
On 1 January 1900, the mayor of Ljubljana Ivan Hribar proposed the construction of an electric tramway. Soon after Ivan's proposal, work began with the first tracks being laid in Spring of 1901. In Summer of the same year, the city began test journeys with the network officially opening on the 6th of September 1901. At the inauguration and for some time after, the tram network consisted of three lines with a rolling stock of thirteen trams and one unpowered trailer. The network also had a small truck for the maintenance and upkeep of the line. The line was 5220 metres long and was fully electrified to a current of 500V. The trams had a driver cab on either side, which meant no turntables were needed as they were able to drive the other way at a terminus point. The trams were able to accommodate a maximum of thirty people with a maximum speed of 18/mph.

The owner of the tramway was a firm called 'Splošna maloželezniška družba' (English: 'General small-railway group') that was a subsidiary of a German firm called 'Siemens & Halske'. In the first years of tram operation, the tramway did not bring in the expected profit the firm had hoped, so in the 1930s, the tramway went under the ownership of a new municipally owned firm called 'Električna cestna železnica' (English: Electric road railway). In the years between 1931 and 1940, the city built more lines and extended the existing station platforms. The city then purchased fifteen pieces of new rolling stock; nine of these trams were locally made in the depot. From this point onwards, Slovenian engineer Feliks Lobe oversaw the tramway's new projects and expansions.

After these extensions, the netwerk reached its final form in 1940 with a total length of 21 kilometres (13 mi). The fleet consisted of 53 motor cars and 19 trailers. A new depot was also constructed in Šiška. This depot is the present day bus depot and some older residents of Ljubljana still call the bus depot 'Tramvajkomanda' (English: Tram Command Station).

During the second World War, the tramway operated relatively normally. The trams had bilingual signs, the timetable was adjusted to limit nighttime services, and there was a shortage of replacement parts. Two intriguing aspects of the tramway's operation during the war, is that the tramway's operation expanded and that Italian soldiers travelled on the trams free of charge. The line towards Šentvid even crossed the Italian border, where on Celovška Road there was a border crossing between Italy and "Slovenia" (Slovenia was occupied by Germany at the time). Later on, the German occupiers prevented the trams from crossing the border, meaning all tram journeys to Šentvid were ultimately cancelled.

After the second World War, many Yugoslav towns and cities with tram systems took out their systems, as they took up a lot of space in an era when it was needed for an increasing number of automobiles. In Ljubljana however, the city at first tried to modernise the tram tracks and rolling stock, even though the tramway started to fall out of fashion with the locals. In 1951, a few trolleybuses began running on a brand new trolleybus line. This was the beginning of the end for the tramway. On the 20th of December 1958, the Ljubljana tramway made its last ever journey. The tram's "funeral" was experienced by a sizeable crowd.

Soon after the last day of operation the tracks were dismantled and the remaining usabLe rolling stock was sold to the cities of Osijek and Subotica, where they served for a few more years. Not long after the tramway's closure, there were proposals to reinstate it, although they just remained on paper.

=== Style of Operation ===
The tramway operated according to two published timetables; a summer timetable, and a partially reduced winter timetable. According to the most recent timetable, the trams started running at 06:00 and finished at 22:00 however during the winter, they started and finished half an hour early at 05:30, and then at 21:30. The interval of trams on the network was around every fifteen minutes between 09:00 and 22:00 according to said timetables, however in reality, the trams operated at a five to seven minute interval.

=== Tramway Network in the 1900s ===
Combined length of tramway network: 3.2 miles

Tramway Network in the 1900s
| Line Number | Route |
|---|---|
| Line 1 | Railway Station - Magistrat/Town Square |
| Line 2 | Magistrat/Town Square - Military Hospital |
| Line 3 | Magistrat/Town Square - Dolenjski Kolodvor |

=== Tramway Network in the 1940s ===
Combined length of tramway network: 13.2 miles

Tramway Network in the 1940s
| Line Number | Route |
|---|---|
| Line 1 | Šentvid - Ajdovščina - General Hospital |
| Line 2 | Vič - Ajdovščina - Sveti Križ/Žale |
| Line 3 | Magistrat - Rakovnik |
| Line 4 | Post Office - Sveti Križ/Žale |

== Plans for a New Tramway ==
Reintroduction of an actual tram system to Ljubljana has been proposed again repeatedly in the 2000s.

According to the new Area Plan MOL (2008), that talks about changes to areas in Ljubljana to the year 2025, a new tramway that could potentially be built in the future would be the primary public transport option for the city. It would focus on the Celovška, Dunajska, Šmartinska, Zaloška, Barjanska, and Tržaška roads as they all meet near the city centre. This project could cost an estimated two billion euros.
