= Lucija, Piran =

Lucija Sveta Lucija (until 1961), Lucia (Italian)
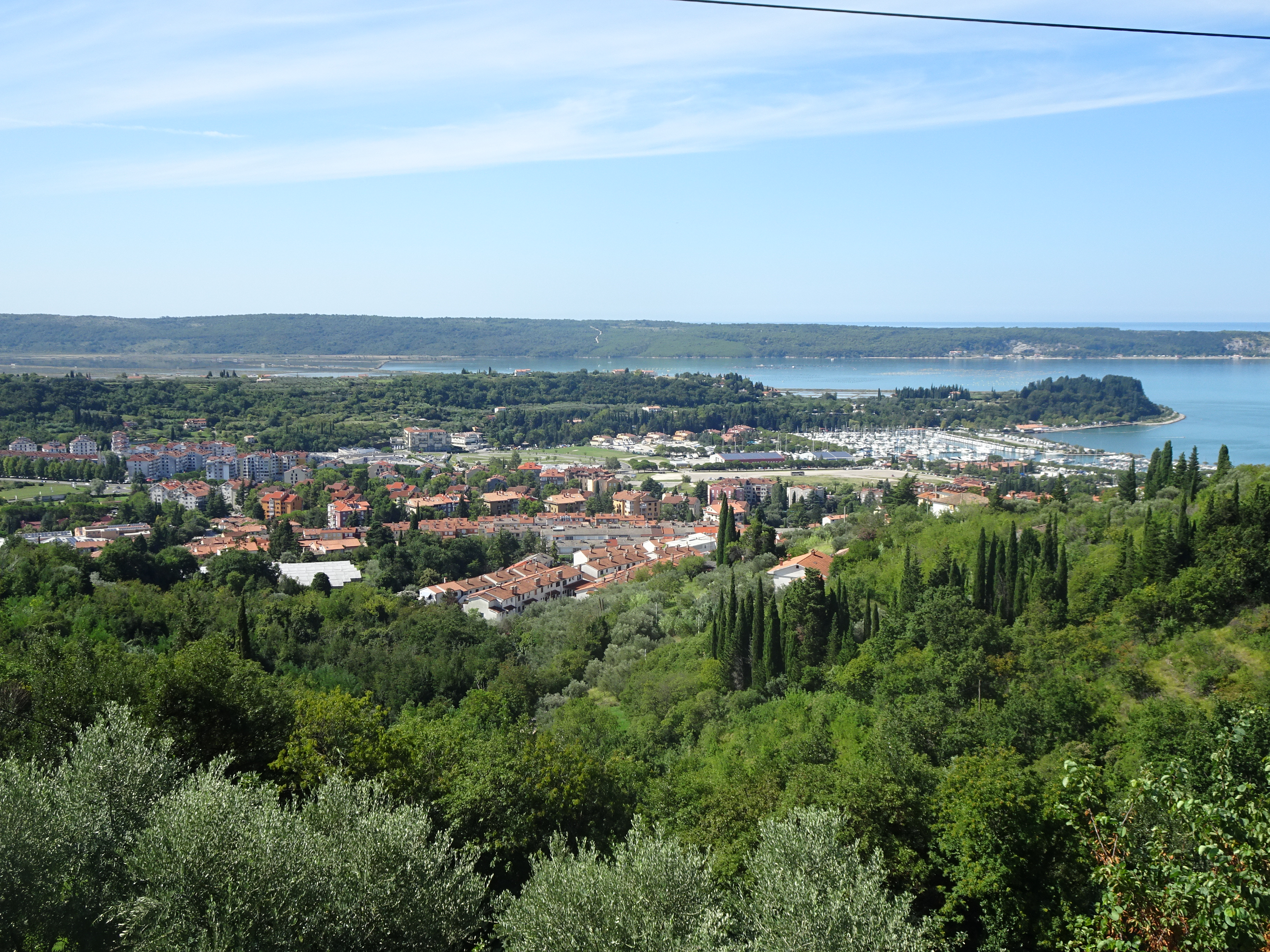

- Location in Slovenia
- Coordinates: 45°30′24.23″N 13°36′5.73″E
- Country: Slovenia
- Traditional region: Slovenian Littoral
- Statistical region: Coastal–Karst
- Municipality: Piran

Area
  - Total: 4.42 km^{2} (1.71 sq mi)
- Elevation: 3.6 m (12 ft)

Population (2018)
  - Total: 6,057
  - Density: 1,400/km^{2} (3,600/sq mi)

Lucija (pronounced [luˈtsiːja]; Italian: Lucia) is a settlement in the Municipality of Piran in the Slovene Istria region. With a population over 6,000, it is the largest settlement in Slovenia that is not a municipality in its own right.

== Name ==
Lucija was attested in written sources in 1763–87 as S. Luzia, S. Lucia, and St. Luzia. The settlement is named after the local church, now the parish church, which is dedicated to Saint Lucy. The name of the settlement was changed from Sveta Lucija (literally, 'Saint Lucy') to Lucija (literally, 'Lucy') in 1961. The name was changed on the basis of the 1948 Law on Names of Settlements and Designations of Squares, Streets, and Buildings as part of efforts by Slovenia's postwar communist government to remove religious elements from toponyms.

== Church ==
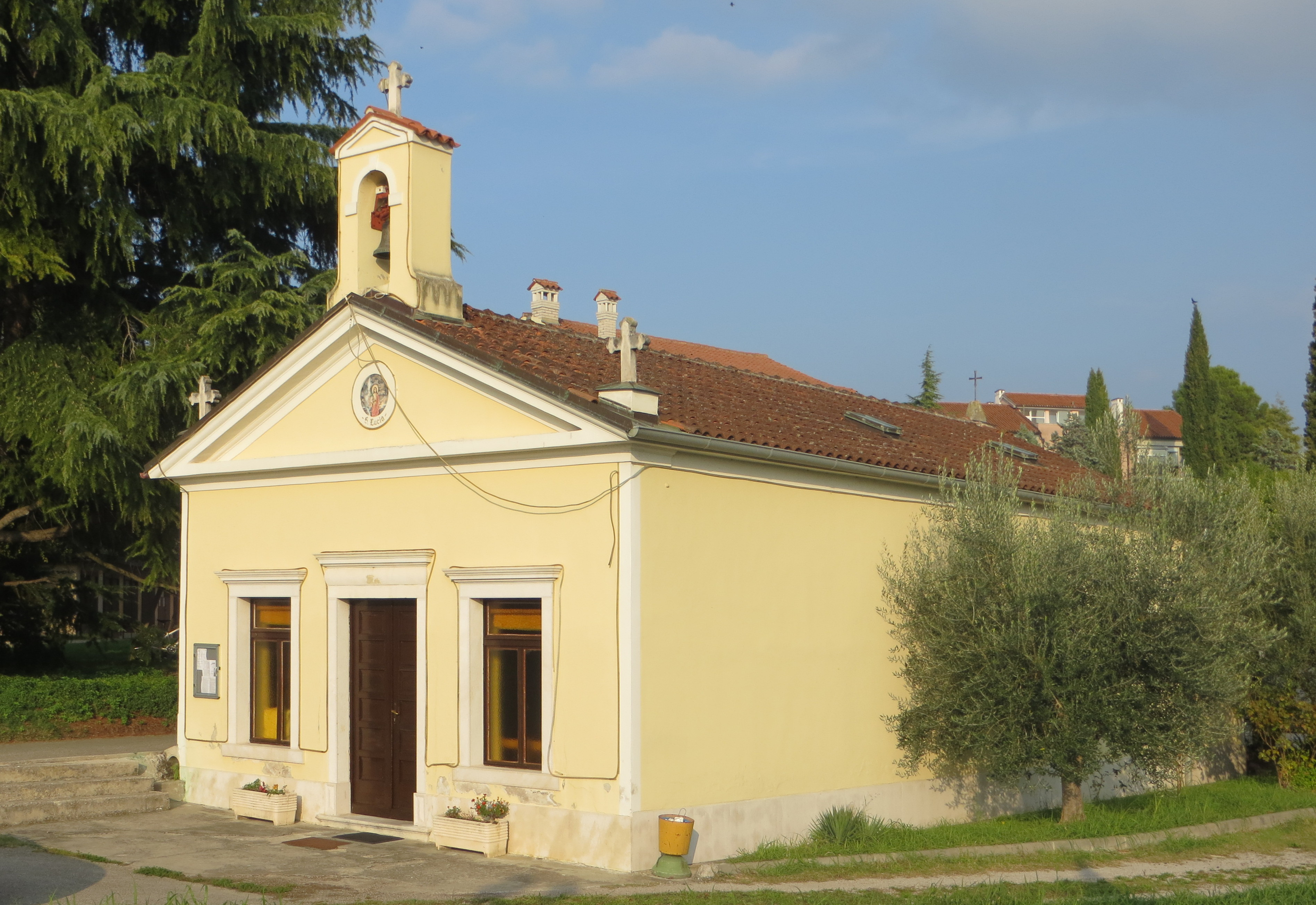
Saint Lucy's Church

The parish church in Lucija is dedicated to Saint Lucy. It is a single-nave Baroque structure dating back to the mid-16th century. The main altar was created by the 18th-century Piran stone cutter Gasparo Albertini.

== Marina ==
Southwest of Lucija is the Lucija Marina, owned by the Marina Portorož company. The first attempts to reuse the abandoned Lucija saltworks began in 1964, when a boathouse was built for sport and recreation activities, although it gained little popularity over the years. In 1970, efforts got underway to establish a new water sports facility (Slovene: Dom vodnih športov). In 1973, the Casino gambling company expressed interest in building various tourism and yachting facilities on the saltpans, which were in ruins after years of neglect. Construction of the marina began in 1977; the first phase was finished in 1982 and the second in 1986. The official opening took place in May 1986. The marina is now a popular site, and the international nautical exhibition is held there every year.
