= D44 road (Croatia) =

Road in Croatia

D44 state road

Route information
- Length: 50.5 km (31.4 mi)

Major junctions
- From: A9 and D301 in Nova Vas interchange
- D201 in Buzet
- To: A8 in Lupoglav interchange

Location
- Country: Croatia
- Counties: Istria
- Major cities: Lupoglav, Buzet, Motovun

Highway system
- Highways in Croatia

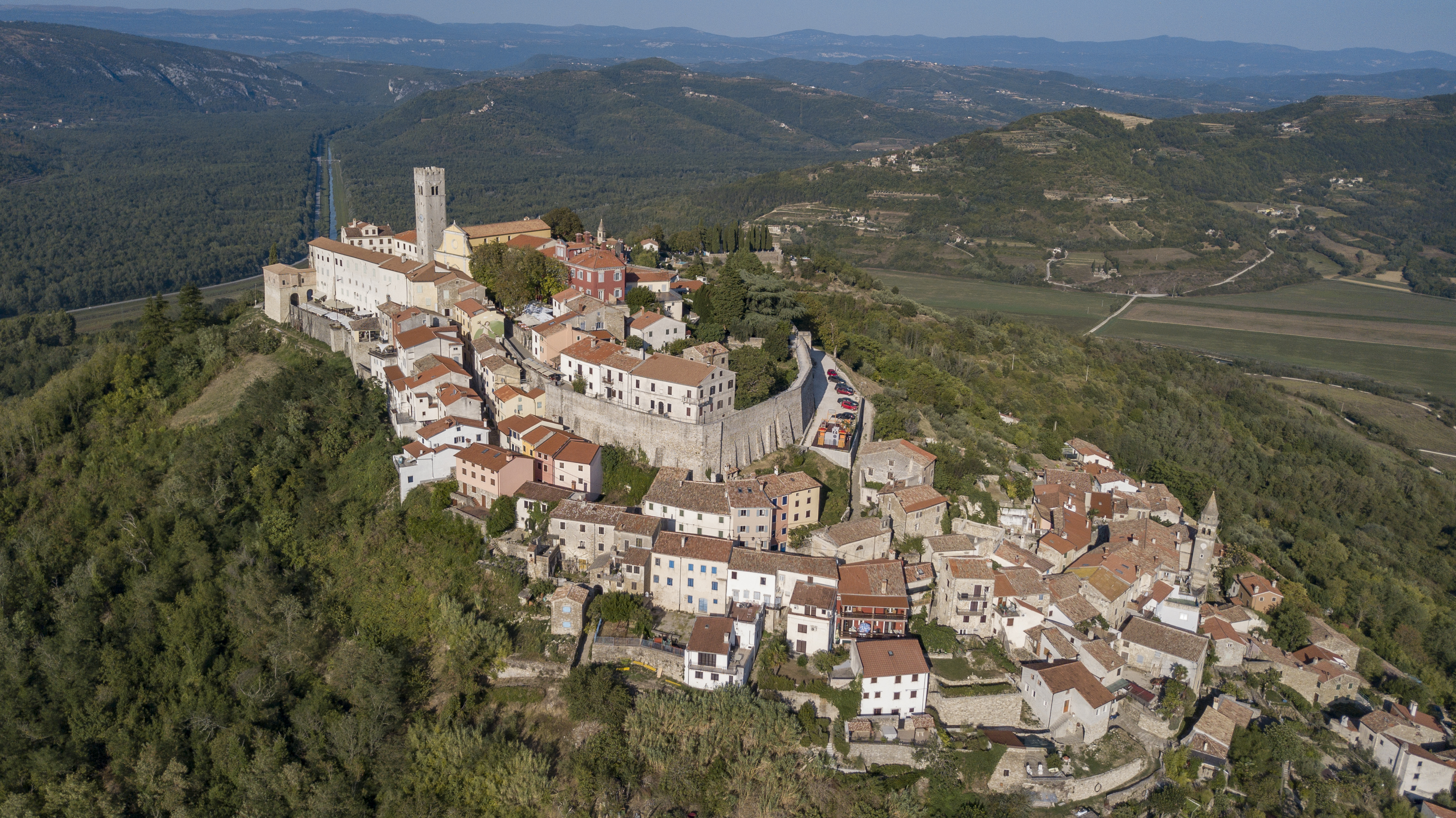
Motovun, immediately to the south of D44

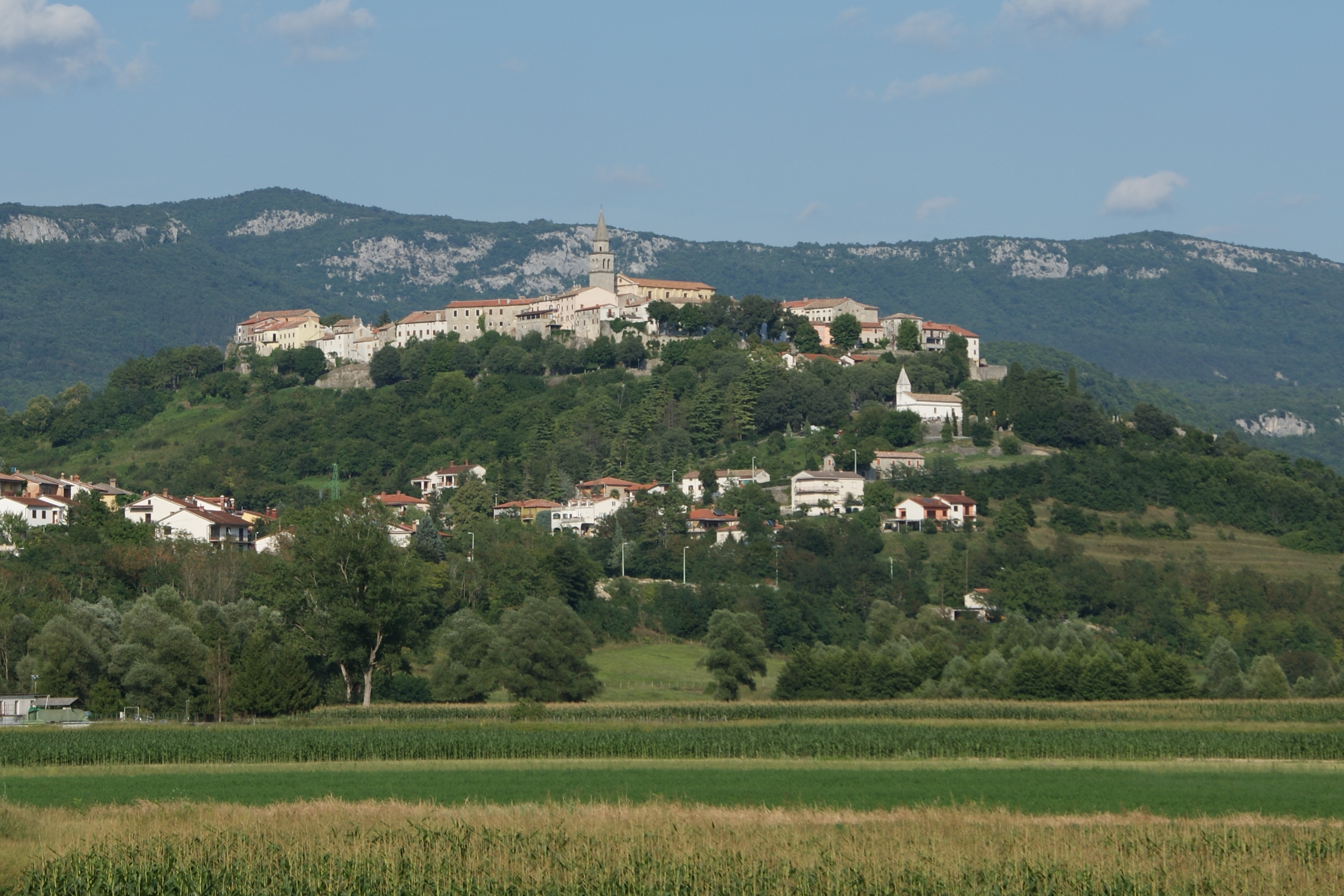
Buzet, on the D44 route

D44 is a state road connecting A9 motorway Nova Vas interchange to A8 expressway Lupoglav interchange via Buzet. The road is 50.5 km (31.4 mi) long.

The road also provides connections to numerous towns and cities in central Istria, most notably to Lupoglav, Buzet, Motovun either directly or via numerous roads connecting to D44. Prior to construction of A8 motorway, D44 was the main east-west road communication in the northern Istria, serving touristic resorts in the northern part of Istria.

The road, as well as all other state roads in Croatia, is managed and maintained by Hrvatske ceste, a state-owned company.

== Traffic volume ==
Traffic is regularly counted and reported by Hrvatske ceste, operator of the road. Substantial variations between annual (AADT) and summer (ASDT) traffic volumes are attributed to the fact that the road connects to A8 motorway carrying substantial tourist traffic.

D44 traffic volume
Road	Counting site	AADT	ASDT	Notes
D44	2750 Ponte Porton	993	2,096	The westernmost traffic counting site on D44.
D44	2706 Fontana	2,613	3,596	Adjacent to the Ž5013 junction.
D44	2806 Lupoglav north	3,072	4,753	The easternmost traffic counting site on D44.

== Road junctions and populated areas ==
D44 junctions/populated areas
Type	Slip roads/Notes
	A9 motorway at Nova Vas interchange. To Umag (to the north) and to Kanfanar and Pula (to the south). D301 to Novigrad (D75). The western terminus of the road.
	Ž5209 to Buje and Kaštel (D510) (to the north) and Vižinada and Vrh Lima (D75) (to the south).
	Ž5007 to Livade, Oprtalj and Buje (to the north) and Motovun and Karojba (to the south).
	Ž5010 to Istarske Toplice.
	Buzet; D201 to Požane border crossing. Ž5011 to Brest and Vodice. Ž5013 to Cerovlje.
	Sveti Ivan
	Selca
	Čiritež
	Ročko Polje
	Lupoglav; Ž5014 to Lanišće and Račja Vas.
	A8 motorway at Lupoglav interchange. To Pazin and Kanfanar (to the west) and to Rijeka (to the east). The eastern terminus of the road.
