= Račice =

Račice may refer to places:

== Croatia ==
- Račice, Croatia, a village in the Buzet municipality

== Czech Republic ==
- Račice (Litoměřice District), a municipality and village in the Ústí nad Labem Region
- Račice (Rakovník District), a municipality and village in the Central Bohemian Region
- Račice (Třebíč District), a municipality and village in the Vysočina Region
- Račice (Žďár nad Sázavou District), a municipality and village in the Vysočina Region
- Račice nad Trotinou, a municipality and village in the Hradec Králové Region
- Račice, a village and part of Račice-Pístovice in the South Moravian Region

== Slovenia ==
- Račice, Ilirska Bistrica, a village in the Municipality of Ilirska Bistrica
