= Rim =

Rim may refer to:

- Rim (basketball), the hoop through which the ball must pass
  - Breakaway rim, a sprung basketball rim
- Rim (coin), the raised edge which surrounds the coin design
- Rim (crater), extending above the local surface
- Rim (firearms), a projection machined into the bottom of a firearms cartridge
- Rim (novel), by Alexander Besher
- Rim (wheel), the outer part of a wheel on which the tire is mounted
- Slang term for anilingus
- "Rim", a song by Brooke Candy featuring Violet Chachki and Aquaria from the album Sexorcism
- Rim (singer), a Japanese singer and virtual YouTuber

RIM may stand for:

- Rapid Interim Measures proposed by the Review Body on Bid Challenges under the World Trade Organization's Agreement on Government Procurement
- Reaction injection molding, a type of processing for network polymers
- Recording Industry Association of Malaysia
- Red Island Minerals, Australia coal company
- Reference Information Model, in Health Level Standards 7
- Relational Information Management, a DBMS
- Remote Infrastructure Management of computer systems
- Research in Motion, a Canadian company later named BlackBerry Limited
- Réseau des Institutions de Microfinance, a network of microfinance institutions in Burundi
- Revolutionary Internationalist Movement, an international Maoist organization
- Royal Indian Marine, name of the British Indian navy 1912–1928
- The US military designation for a ship-launched, intercept, guided missile; examples include
  - RIM-66 Standard
  - RIM-7 Sea Sparrow
- Russian Imperial Movement, Russian neo-Nazi paramilitary organization

== Places ==
- Rim, Istria County, Croatia
- Rim, Črnomelj, Slovenia
- Rim, Nepal, Salyan District, Rapti Zone
- Rim, Primorje-Gorski Kotar County, a village near Vrbovsko, Croatia
- Rim (state constituency), an election constituency in the Malacca legislature in Malaysia

== See also ==
- RIMS (disambiguation)
