= Strana =

Strana may refer to:

- Strana.ua, a Ukrainian newspaper
- Strana, Croatia, a village in Istria
- Strana (newspaper), Russian newspaper published in 1906-1907
