= Prodani =

Prodani may refer to:

- Prodani, Romania, a village near Vedea, Argeș
- Prodani, Croatia, a village near Buzet
