= Marinci =

Marinci may refer to:

- Marinci (supporter group), organized football supporters from Subotica, Serbia
- Marinci, Vukovar-Syrmia County, a village in the Nuštar municipality, Croatia
- Marinci, Istria County, a village in the Buzet municipality, Croatia
