= D44 =

D44, D-44 or D.44 may refer to:

- 85 mm divisional gun D-44, a Soviet artillery gun
- Aero D-44, a German military transport aircraft
- D44 road (Croatia)
- HMS Danae (D44), a Danae-class cruiser of the Royal Navy
- HMS Imogen (D44), a I-class destroyer of the Royal Navy
- HMS Lagos (D44), a Battle-class destroyer of the Royal Navy
- Digital Forty Four, an Australian datacasting service
- Semi-Slav Defence, a chess opening
