= D201 road =

Road in Croatia

D201 state road

Route information
- Length: 7.1 km (4.4 mi)

Major junctions
- From: Požane border crossing to Slovenia; Slovenian route 208
- To: D44 in Buzet

Location
- Country: Croatia
- Counties: Istria
- Major cities: Buzet

Highway system
- Highways in Croatia

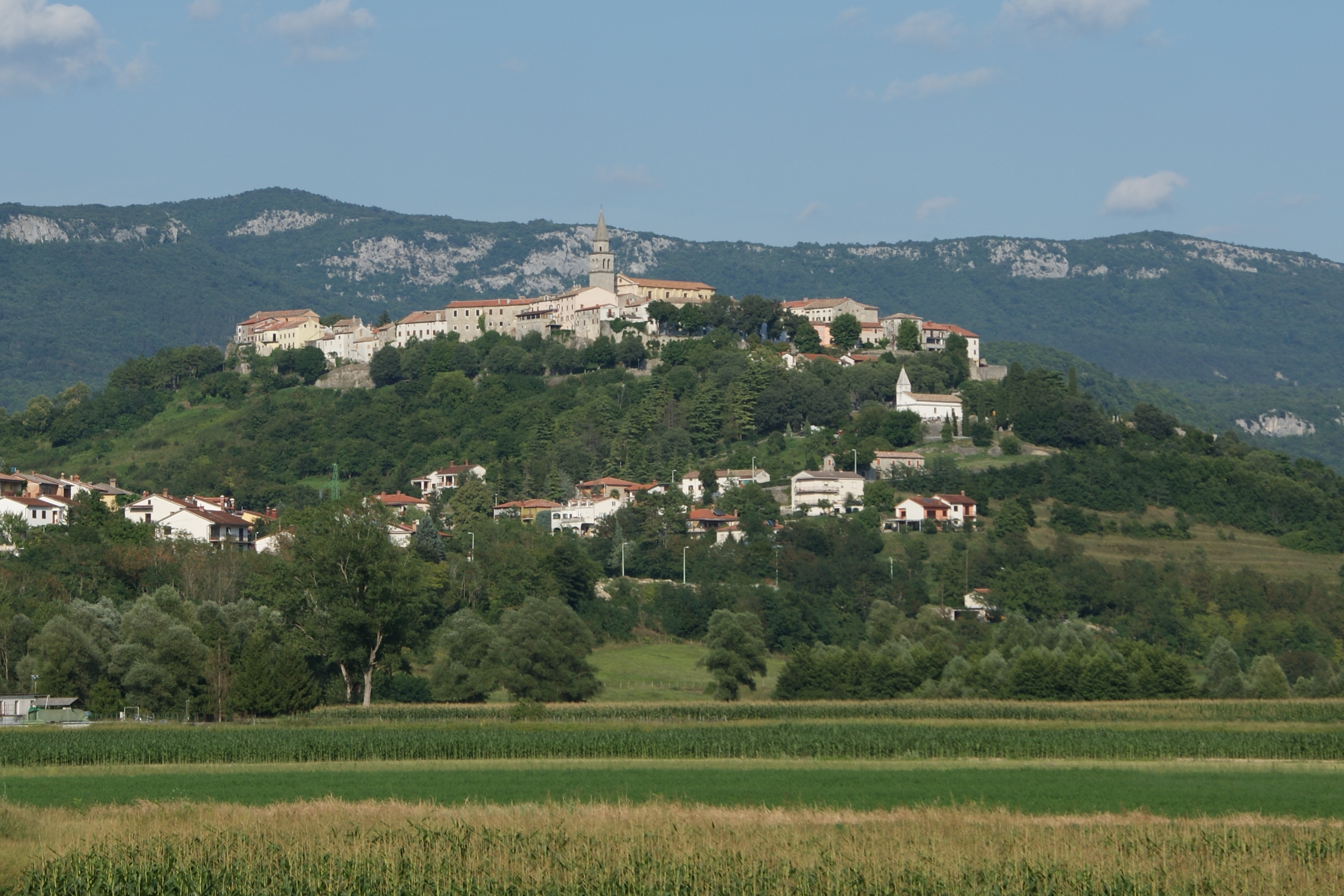
Buzet, at the southern terminus of D201

D201 is a state road connecting D44 state road in Buzet to Požane border crossing to Slovenia. The road is 7.1 km (4.4 mi) long.

Like all state roads in Croatia, the D201 too is managed and maintained by Hrvatske ceste, state owned company.

== Traffic volume ==
Traffic is regularly counted and reported by Hrvatske ceste, operator of the road. Substantial variations between annual (AADT) and summer (ASDT) traffic volumes are attributed to the fact that the road carries substantial tourist traffic to Istria.

D201 traffic volume
Road	Counting site	AADT	ASDT	Notes
D201	2704 Štrped	3,487	5,129	The only published traffic counting site on D201.

== Road junctions and populated areas ==
D201 junctions/populated areas
Type	Slip roads/Notes
	Požane border crossing to Slovenia. Slovenian route 208. The northern terminus of the road.
	Štrped
	Buzet; D44 to A8 motorway (to the east) and A9/B9 expressway (to the west). The southern terminus of the road.
