= Krušvar =

Krušvar may refer to:

- Krušvar, Croatia, a village in Dicmo, Dalmatia
- Zoran Krušvar (born 1977), Croatian writer

== See also ==
- Krušvari, a village in Istria, Croatia
