= Štrped =

Štrped Sterpeto
- Village
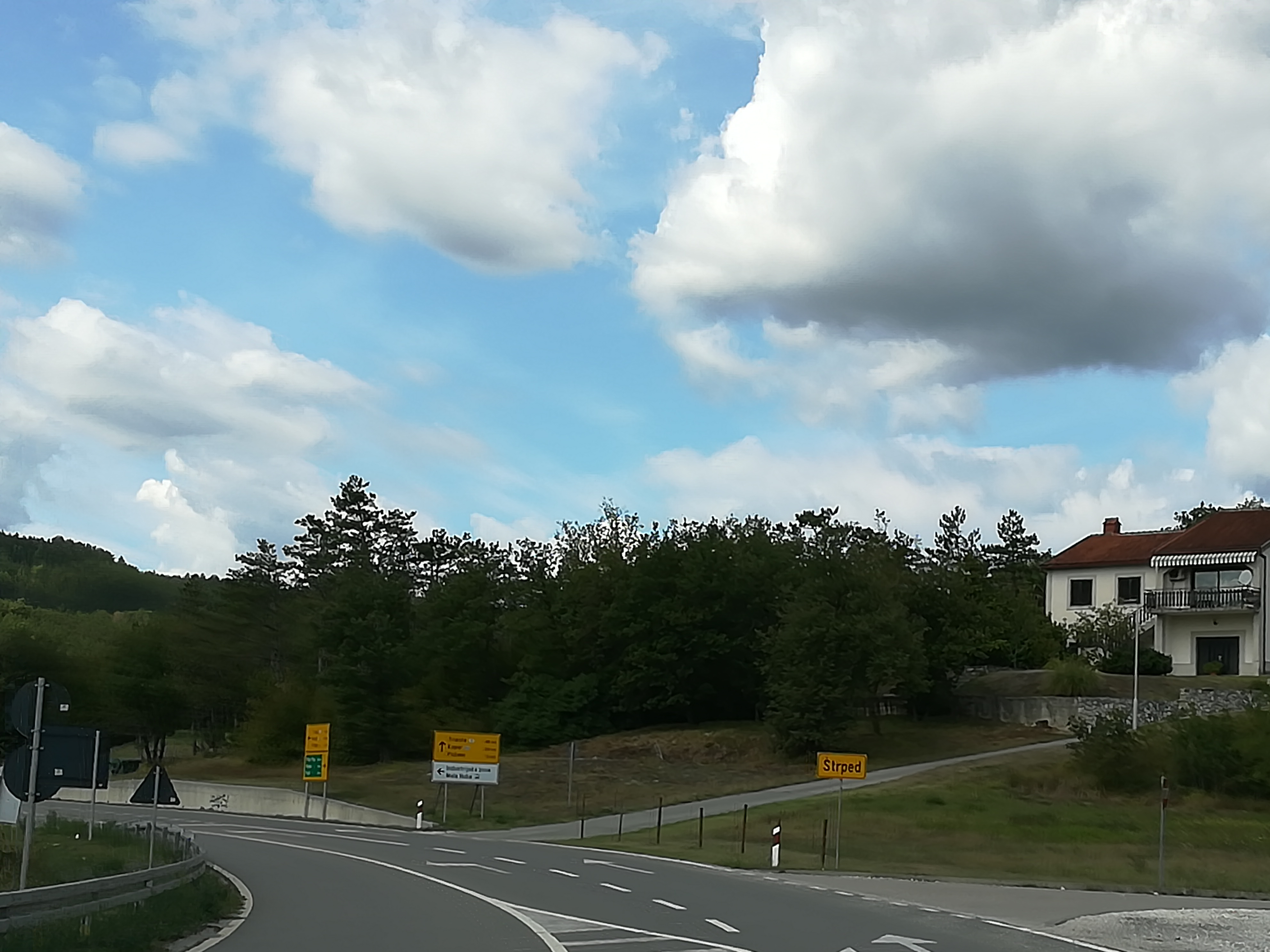

- Location within Croatia
- Coordinates: 45.4254237°N 13.925037°E
- Country: Croatia
- County: Istria
- Municipality: Buzet

Area
  - Total: 1.2 sq mi (3.2 km^{2})
- Elevation: 390 ft (119 m)

Population (2021)
  - Total: 222
  - Density: 180/sq mi (69/km^{2})
- Time zone: UTC+1 (CET)
  - Summer (DST): UTC+2 (CEST)
- Postal code: 52420 Buzet
- Area code: 052

Štrped (Italian: Sterpeto) is a village in Istria, Croatia, situated at the base of the Ćićarija range. Ecclesiastically, it is under the Buzet parish.

== Architecture ==
Its spiritual centre is the Sv. Duh church, located 1 km north of Štrped in an eponymous hamlet. It was built in three phases. The first phase was a 13th century Romanesque aisleless church of which a portal with stone lunette is all that remains. The second phase finished in the year 1500 and involved the addition of a late Gothic polygonal sacristy with a pointed vault. The third phase saw the nave covered with a Baroque roof and the addition of a semicircular loggia. Among the mason's marks on the outer side of the apse is that of the "Carniolan Master", (Note: Majstor iz Kranja) also responsible for Sv. Jurja church in Oprtalj. The main altar was built in 1636, but an some remains of an older altar dating to the beginning of the 16th century persist. There is also a gilded wooden side-altar. The church has been the subject of a number of works since 1969.

== History ==
The environs of Štrped were settled in prehistoric and ancient times.

In 1521, a Latin inscription was made on the eastern wall of Sv. Duha:

QVODCV. LIGA (VERIS). SVP
TER.ERI. LIG. IN CEL: ET
QVO. SOL. SVP. TER
ERV. SOL ET IN CELO
1521

A monastery of the Order of Friars Minor Conventual was built next to Sv. Duha in 1620, but it was destroyed in a fire in 1768 and abandoned in 1773.

In 1636, a gilded side-altar was built for Sv. Duha church, with the inscription:

IN CONCEPTIONE TVA VIRGO
IMMACVLATA
FVISTI
MDCXXXVI

In 1699, a benefactor stone was inscribed with the inscription by the hand or commission of gvardian John and placed in the north wall next to the altar:

ILL: EXC D JOSEPH MAVROCENO
HOSPITI BENEFACTORI
F.IO.DOM.KREGLIA GVARD.
ANO DOM M.D.C. LXXXXIX

In 1850 Sv. Duha was given a new whitewash, as attested by an inscription:

GIOV FLEGO FECE
STUCARE LA CHIESA S SPIRITO
NELL ANNO 1850

In 1857, the current southern altar in honour of saint Anthony of Padua was set in place in Sv. Duh with the inscription:

ALTARE. HOC. OMNIPTOENTI DEO IN HONOREM
S. ANTONII PATAVINI
ERECTVM PRIVILEGIO QVOTIDIANO PERPETVO AC LIBERO
PRO OMNIBVS DEFVCTIS AD QVOSCVMQVE SACERDOTES
VIGORE BREVIS BENEDICTI PAPE XIV DIE IV OCTO
MDCCLI INSIGNITVM ATQVE A MINISTRO GENERALI
ORDINIS DIE IX MENSIS IANVRI MCCLVI
DESIGNATVM

=== Glagolitic inscription ===
By the time of its 1906 publication by Luka Jelić, (Note: probably earlier) a Glagolitic inscription dated 6 April 1500 had become known to epigraphers from the presbytery of Sv. Duha church in Štrped:

Ⱍ·Ⱇ ⰮⰔⰜ
ⰀⰒⰓⰋⰎⰀ ·
ⰄⰐⰬ ·Ⰵ·

The ⰒⰓ is written as a ligature. The inscription was further mentioned by Vjekoslav Spinčić in 1913, Rudolf Strohal in 1915, Radovan Ivančević and Branko Fučić in 1969, with Ivančević providing a reproduction. Finally, an image of the inscription was published by Fučić in 1982.

Although the inscription is short, it played a prominent role in the debate between Italian irredentists and Slavs over the future of the Julian March.

== Demographics ==
According to the 2021 census, its population was 222.

Village of Štrped: Population trends 1857–2021
v

population	378	410	290	342	344	432			298	272	183	163	175	181	177	189	222
	1857	1869	1880	1890	1900	1910	1921	1931	1948	1953	1961	1971	1981	1991	2001	2011	2021

Note:The data for 1857 and 1869 included Kajini and part of Mala Huba and Perci. Sources: Croatian Bureau of Statistics publications

As of 2005, most residents were farmers, while part of the population worked in Buzet, with some recent development of small industry in Štrped itself.

== Gallery ==
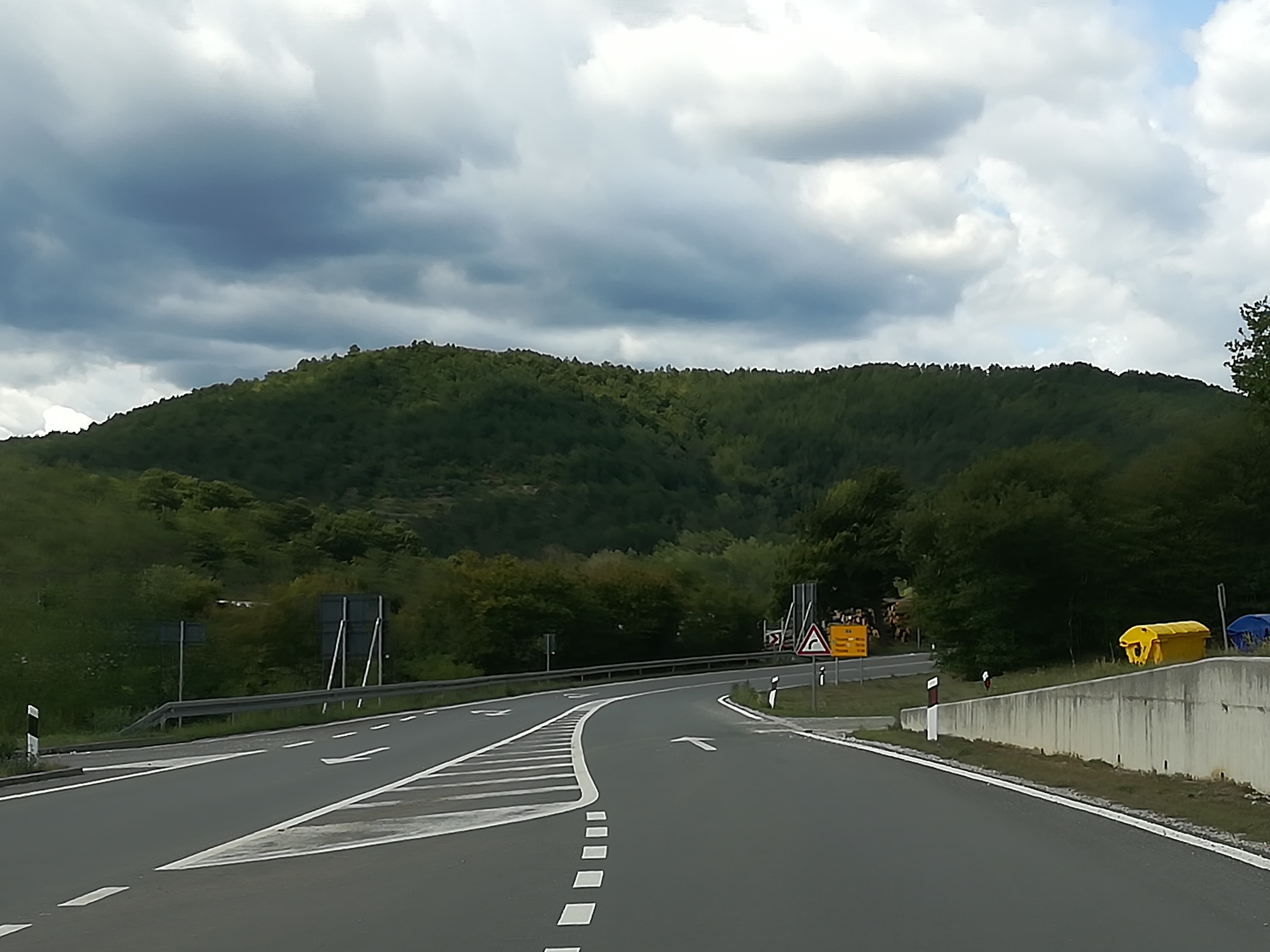
Hills from Štrped

== Selected works ==
=== Archaeology ===
- Buršić-Matijašić, Klara (2000). "Arheološka topografija Štrpeda i okolice". Buzetski zbornik. 26: 11–20. ISSN 0350-6088.

=== Architecture ===
- Ivančević, Radoslav (2001). "Crkva sv. Duha kod Štrpeda u Istri". Buzetski zbornik. 27. ISSN 0350-6088.
- Štrk Snoj, Maja (1989). "Crkva Sv. Duha u Svetom Duhu kraj Štrpeda u svjetlu novih nalaza". Buzetski zbornik. 13. ISSN 0350-6088.
