= Anne Marden (rower) =

American rower (born 1958)

Personal information
- Born: June 12, 1958 (age 68) Boston, Massachusetts, U.S.
Medal record
Women's rowing
Representing the United States
Olympic Games
Silver medal – second place	1984 Los Angeles	Coxed quad sculls
Silver medal – second place	1988 Seoul	Single sculls
World Rowing Championships
Bronze medal – third place	1985 Hazewinkel	Single sculls

Anne Marden (born June 12, 1958) is a rower from the United States. She was born in Boston, Massachusetts.

== Early competition ==
Anne started rowing at Phillips Exeter Academy in the spring of 1974 age 15. She rowed at Princeton University where she met up with coach Kris Korzeniowski in 1977 and developed a love for sculling despite being caught in a serious hailstorm in Lake Carnegie (New Jersey). After Kris Korzeniowski (1977–1981), Anne was coached by Jean Pierre Leroux of Fontainebleau, France (1985–1988) and by Hartmut Buschbacher of Germany (1991–1992). Anne trained on the Seine in France in 1985 and from 1986 to 1993 rowed mainly on the Tideway in London, England as well as the Wallingford stretch of the River Thames. After 18 months in France to study for an MBA at INSEAD (Dec 1985 – April 1986), Anne moved to London in May 1986. By the time her rowing career came to an end in 1993 she had won the women's championship single at Boston's Head of the Charles Regatta 7 times (1986–1993 with 1990 skipped owing to late world championships in Australia).

== Olympian ==
Marden qualified for the 1980 U.S. Olympic team but was unable to compete due to the 1980 Summer Olympics boycott. She did however receive one of 461 Congressional Gold Medals created especially for the spurned athletes. She competed for the United States in the 1984 Summer Olympics held in Los Angeles, California in the quadruple sculls event where she finished in second place. At the 1988 Summer Olympics held in Seoul, South Korea she finished in second place in the single sculls event. Four years later in the Barcelona Olympics she missed out on a third medal finishing fourth in the single sculls.

== Career ==
When she competed for the US Olympic Rowing team in Seoul and Barcelona she was living in the United Kingdom and working for JPMorgan/London.

== See also ==
- List of Princeton University Olympians
