= Pračana =

Pračana Brazzana
- Village
- Location within Croatia
- Coordinates: 45.3828295°N 13.8821582°E
- Country: Croatia
- County: Istria
- Municipality: Buzet

Area
  - Total: 1.4 sq mi (3.6 km^{2})

Population (2021)
  - Total: 97
  - Density: 70/sq mi (27/km^{2})
- Time zone: UTC+1 (CET)
  - Summer (DST): UTC+2 (CEST)
- Postal code: 52420 Buzet
- Area code: 052

Pračana (Italian: Brazzana) is a village in Istria, Croatia.

== Demographics ==
According to the 2021 census, its population was 97.
