= Klarići =

Klarići Clarici
- Village
- Location within Croatia
- Coordinates: 45.358333°N 13.958333°E
- Country: Croatia
- County: Istria
- Municipality: Buzet

Area
  - Total: 1.4 sq mi (3.5 km^{2})
- Elevation: 545 ft (166 m)

Population (2021)
  - Total: 34
  - Density: 25/sq mi (9.7/km^{2})
- Time zone: UTC+1 (CET)
  - Summer (DST): UTC+2 (CEST)
- Postal code: 52420 Buzet
- Area code: 052

Klarići (Italian: Clarici) is a village in Istria County, Croatia. Administratively it belongs to Buzet.

== Geography ==
It lies at the Northern part of Istria Peninsula, 17 km from Pazin and 5 km South from the centre of the settlement.

== Demographics ==
According to the 2021 census, its population was 34.

=== Historical population ===
Change of population
| 1857 | 1869 | 1880 | 1890 | 1900 | 1910 | 1921 | 1931 | 1948 | 1953 | 1961 | 1971 | 1981 | 1991 | 2001 | 2011 | 2021 |
| 179 | 194 | 129 | 129 | 134 | 150 | 0 | 0 | 145 | 137 | 112 | 78 | 66 | 52 | 45 | 39 | 34 |
