= Alexander Besher =

American novelist

Alexander Besher (born in China in 1951, died on October 8, 2020) is an author of fiction and non-fiction. In addition to novels, screenplays and teleplays, he is a journalist, consulting futurist on Pacific Rim affairs (for the San Francisco-based Global Business Network, the corporate future scenarios think-tank) former editor of Chicago Review and co-founder of The Chicago Review Press (1973–present).

== Biography ==
Alexander Besher's formative years were in Japan where he grew up and lived for twenty years, graduating from Canadian Academy High School in Kobe and Sophia University in Tokyo.

Besher was contributing editor of InfoWorld. He wrote the internationally syndicated weekly column "Pacific Rim", covering business trends, technology, and cultural trends for a period of six years for The San Francisco Chronicle. This led to his authoring and editing the compendium The Pacific Rim Almanac.

== Works ==
=== Novels ===
- Rim Trilogy: science fiction, set in Japan in the 2020s and 2030s (HarperCollins and Simon & Schuster)
  - Rim, Philip K. Dick Award nominee
  - Mir
  - Chi
- Kabbalah noir genre: literary supernatural action adventure exorcism tales in the style of Hasidic fables.
  - The Clinging, novel and screenplay, set in contemporary San Francisco
  - The Night of the Golem, semi-sequel set in Nazi Berlin
  - The Unchosen, semi-sequel set in 1939/40 Shanghai

=== Transmedia ===
- The Manga Man (2008)
