= Rimnjak =

Rimnjak Rimignacco
- Location of Rimnjak in Croatia
- Coordinates: 45.354167°N 13.922222°E
- Country: Croatia
- County: Istria County
- Municipality: Buzet

Government
  - Mayor: Valter Flego
- Elevation: 166 m (545 ft)
- Postal code: 52420

Rimnjak (Italian: Rimignacco) is a village in Istria County, Croatia. Administratively it belongs to Buzet.

== Geography ==
It lies at the Northern part of Istria Peninsula, 16 km North from Pazin and 6 km South from the centre of the settlement.

== Historical population ==
Change of population
1857	1869	1880	1890	1900	1910	1921	1931	1948	1953	1961	1971	1981	1991	2001	2011
0	0	46	49	62	58	0	0	59	50	38	27	26	31	28	19
