= Seljaci =

Settlement in Istria County, Croatia

- Settlement
- Interactive map of Seljaci
- Location of Seljaci in Croatia
- Coordinates: 45°25′34″N 13°53′53″E
- Country: Croatia
- County: Istria County
- City: Buzet

Area
  - Total: 2.7 km^{2} (1.0 sq mi)

Population (2021)
  - Total: 14
  - Density: 5.2/km^{2} (13/sq mi)
- Time zone: UTC+1 (CET)
  - Summer (DST): UTC+2 (CEST)
- Postal code: 52420 Buzet
- Area code: +385 (0)52

Seljaci is a settlement in the City of Buzet in Croatia. In 2021, its population was 14.

== Demographics ==
Seljaci: Population trends 1857–2021
v

population			112	106	102	78			111	104	82	42	33	23	23	19	14
	1857	1869	1880	1890	1900	1910	1921	1931	1948	1953	1961	1971	1981	1991	2001	2011	2021

Sources: Croatian Bureau of Statistics publications
