= Krbavčići =

Krbavčići Carbocici
- Village
- Location within Croatia
- Coordinates: 45.4375°N 13.96666667°E
- Country: Croatia
- County: Istria
- Municipality: Buzet

Government
  - Mayor: Valter Flego

Area
  - Total: 0.66 sq mi (1.7 km^{2})
- Elevation: 545 ft (166 m)

Population (2021)
  - Total: 46
  - Density: 70/sq mi (27/km^{2})
- Time zone: UTC+1 (CET)
  - Summer (DST): UTC+2 (CEST)
- Postal code: 52420 Buzet
- Area code: 052

Krbavčići (Italian: Carbocici) is a village in Istria County, Croatia. Administratively it belongs to Buzet.

== Geography ==
It lies at the centre of Istria Peninsula, 24 km from Pazin and 4 km from the centre of the settlement. It is at the border with Slovenia.

== Demographics ==
According to the 2021 census, its population was 46.

== Historical population ==
Change of population
1857	1869	1880	1890	1900	1910	1921	1931	1948	1953	1961	1971	1981	1991	2001	2011	2021
0	0	95	104	112	117	0	0	96	96	81	89	71	57	57	58	46
