= Mali Mlun =

Mali Mlun Milino Piccolo
- Village
- Location within Croatia
- Coordinates: 45.3991454°N 13.8903918°E
- Country: Croatia
- County: Istria
- Municipality: Buzet

Area
  - Total: 0.97 sq mi (2.5 km^{2})

Population (2021)
  - Total: 67
  - Density: 69/sq mi (27/km^{2})
- Time zone: UTC+1 (CET)
  - Summer (DST): UTC+2 (CEST)
- Postal code: 52420 Buzet
- Area code: 052

Mali Mlun (Italian: Milino Piccolo) is a village in Istria, Croatia.

== Demographics ==
According to the 2021 census, its population was 67.
