= Erkovčići =

Erkovčići Ercaucici
- Village
- Location within Croatia
- Coordinates: 45.33893°N 14.0453116°E
- Country: Croatia
- County: Istria
- Municipality: Buzet

Area
  - Total: 1.2 sq mi (3.2 km^{2})

Population (2021)
  - Total: 36
  - Density: 29/sq mi (11/km^{2})
- Time zone: UTC+1 (CET)
  - Summer (DST): UTC+2 (CEST)
- Postal code: 52420 Buzet
- Area code: 052

Erkovčići (Italian: Ercaucici) is a village in Istria, Croatia.

== Demographics ==
According to the 2021 census, its population was 36.
