= Medveje =

Medveje Medea
- Village
- Location within Croatia
- Coordinates: 45.3518672°N 13.9459158°E
- Country: Croatia
- County: Istria
- Municipality: Buzet

Area
  - Total: 0.81 sq mi (2.1 km^{2})

Population (2021)
  - Total: 27
  - Density: 33/sq mi (13/km^{2})
- Time zone: UTC+1 (CET)
  - Summer (DST): UTC+2 (CEST)
- Postal code: 52420 Buzet
- Area code: 052

Medveje (Italian: Medea) is a village in Istria, Croatia.

== Demographics ==
According to the 2021 census, its population was 27.
