= Negnar =

Settlement in Istria County, Croatia

- Settlement
- Interactive map of Negnar
- Location of Negnar in Croatia
- Coordinates: 45°20′24″N 13°56′35″E
- Country: Croatia
- County: Istria County
- City: Buzet

Area
  - Total: 1.2 km^{2} (0.46 sq mi)

Population (2021)
  - Total: 19
  - Density: 16/km^{2} (41/sq mi)
- Time zone: UTC+1 (CET)
  - Summer (DST): UTC+2 (CEST)
- Postal code: 52420 Buzet
- Area code: +385 (0)52

Negnar is a settlement in the City of Buzet in Croatia. In 2021, its population was 19.

== Demographics ==
Negnar: Population trends 1857–2021
v

population			30	41	43	39			50	48	44	30	28	26	24	21	19
	1857	1869	1880	1890	1900	1910	1921	1931	1948	1953	1961	1971	1981	1991	2001	2011	2021

Sources: Croatian Bureau of Statistics publications
