= Šćulci =

Šćulci Schiulzi
- Village
- Location within Croatia
- Coordinates: 45.3385739°N 13.9154914°E
- Country: Croatia
- County: Istria
- Municipality: Buzet

Area
  - Total: 0.89 sq mi (2.3 km^{2})

Population (2021)
  - Total: 36
  - Density: 41/sq mi (16/km^{2})
- Time zone: UTC+1 (CET)
  - Summer (DST): UTC+2 (CEST)
- Postal code: 52420 Buzet
- Area code: 052

Šćulci (Italian: Schiulzi) is a village in Istria, Croatia.

== Demographics ==
According to the 2021 census, its population was 36.
