= Sveti Martin, Buzet =

Sveti Martin San Martino Pinguentino
- Village
- Location within Croatia
- Coordinates: 45.4215112°N 13.9555192°E
- Country: Croatia
- County: Istria
- Municipality: Buzet

Area
  - Total: 0.93 sq mi (2.4 km^{2})

Population (2021)
  - Total: 410
  - Density: 440/sq mi (170/km^{2})
- Time zone: UTC+1 (CET)
  - Summer (DST): UTC+2 (CEST)
- Postal code: 52420 Buzet
- Area code: 052

Sveti Martin (Italian: San Martino Pinguentino) is a village in Istria, Croatia.

== Demographics ==
According to the 2021 census, its population was 410.
