= Stanica Roč =

Stanica Roč Stazione Rozzo
- Village
- Location within Croatia
- Coordinates: 45.4044061°N 14.0283247°E
- Country: Croatia
- County: Istria
- Municipality: Buzet

Area
  - Total: 0.54 sq mi (1.4 km^{2})

Population (2021)
  - Total: 53
  - Density: 98/sq mi (38/km^{2})
- Time zone: UTC+1 (CET)
  - Summer (DST): UTC+2 (CEST)
- Postal code: 52420 Buzet
- Area code: 052

Stanica Roč (Italian: Stazione Rozzo) is a village in Istria, Croatia.

== Demographics ==
According to the 2021 census, its population was 53.
