= Račički Brijeg =

Račički Brijeg Monte di Racizze
- Village
- Location within Croatia
- Coordinates: 45.3508853°N 13.9844096°E
- Country: Croatia
- County: Istria
- Municipality: Buzet

Area
  - Total: 0.69 sq mi (1.8 km^{2})

Population (2021)
  - Total: 67
  - Density: 96/sq mi (37/km^{2})
- Time zone: UTC+1 (CET)
  - Summer (DST): UTC+2 (CEST)
- Postal code: 52420 Buzet
- Area code: 052

Račički Brijeg (Italian: Monte di Racizze) is a village in Istria, Croatia.

== Demographics ==
According to the 2021 census, its population was 67.
