= Forčići =

Settlement in Istria County, Croatia

- Settlement
- Interactive map of Forčići
- Location of Forčići in Croatia
- Coordinates: 45°22′52″N 14°02′31″E
- Country: Croatia
- County: Istria County
- City: Buzet

Area
  - Total: 5.1 km^{2} (2.0 sq mi)

Population (2021)
  - Total: 17
  - Density: 3.3/km^{2} (8.6/sq mi)
- Time zone: UTC+1 (CET)
  - Summer (DST): UTC+2 (CEST)
- Postal code: 52420 Buzet
- Area code: +385 (0)52

Forčići is a settlement in the City of Buzet in Croatia. In 2021, its population was 17.

== Geography ==
Forčići proper is the northernmost of a series of villages on the east slope of the Gradec hill, from the source of the Pivka in the north to the Ponikva karst polje in the south. North to south, the villages are Forčići, Birikija, Rauši, Latini, Savki.

== Demographics ==
Forčići: Population trends 1857–2021
v

population			38	94	135	134			90	77	42	40	28	25	27	22	17
	1857	1869	1880	1890	1900	1910	1921	1931	1948	1953	1961	1971	1981	1991	2001	2011	2021

Sources: Croatian Bureau of Statistics publications
