= Brnobići, Buzet =

Brnobići Bernobici
- Village
- Location within Croatia
- Coordinates: 45°21′50″N 14°02′28″E
- Country: Croatia
- County: Istria
- Municipality: Buzet

Area
  - Total: 1.3 sq mi (3.3 km^{2})

Population (2021)
  - Total: 61
  - Density: 48/sq mi (18/km^{2})
- Time zone: UTC+1 (CET)
  - Summer (DST): UTC+2 (CEST)
- Postal code: 52420 Buzet
- Area code: 052

Brnobići (Italian: Bernobici) is a village in Buzet municipality in Istria County, Croatia.

== Demographics ==
According to the 2021 census, its population was 61. It was 52 in 2011.
