= Marčenegla =

Marčenegla Marcenigla
- Village
- Location within Croatia
- Coordinates: 45.3447252°N 13.940775°E
- Country: Croatia
- County: Istria
- Municipality: Buzet

Area
  - Total: 1.9 km^{2} (0.73 sq mi)

Population (2021)
  - Total: 94
  - Density: 49/km^{2} (130/sq mi)
- Time zone: UTC+1 (CET)
  - Summer (DST): UTC+2 (CEST)
- Postal code: 52420 Buzet
- Area code: 052

Marčenegla (Italian: Marcenigla) is a village in Istria, Croatia.

== Demographics ==
According to the 2021 census, its population was 94.
