= Paladini =

Paladini is a surname. Notable people with the surname include:

- Arcangela Paladini (1599–1622), Italian painter, singer and poet
- Daniel Paladini (born 1984), American soccer player
- George dos Santos Paladini (born 1978), Brazilian soccer player
- Giacomo Paladini (d. 1470), Italian Roman Catholic bishop
- Gianni Paladini (born 1945), Italian football club chairman
- Giovanni Domenico Paladini (1721-1772), Italian painter
- Riccardo Paladini (1879–1943), Italian admiral
