= Baredine =

- Village
- Location within Croatia
- Coordinates: 45.430556°N 13.919444°E
- Country: Croatia
- County: Istria
- Municipality: Buzet

Area
  - Total: 0.77 sq mi (2.0 km^{2})
- Elevation: 545 ft (166 m)

Population (2021)
  - Total: 35
  - Density: 45/sq mi (18/km^{2})
- Time zone: UTC+1 (CET)
  - Summer (DST): UTC+2 (CEST)
- Postal code: 52420 Buzet
- Telephone code: (+385) 052

Baredine is a village in Istria County in Croatia. Administratively it belongs to Buzet.

== Geography ==
It lies at the centre of Istria Peninsula, 23 km from Pazin and 5 km from the centre of the settlement to the Northwest, near Stream Mirna and the border with Slovenia. There is a segregated bicycle road between Brtonigla and Baredine.

== History ==
As an evidence of the excavations, there was here a settlement in the pre-historic period as well, There were some findings from the Roman period. Population came here before the Ottomans during the 15th century. Its citizens worked as farmers, they grew grapes, olives, grains, and corns. Some of them lived from animals, such as cow, ship, donkey or pig.

== Climate ==
Between 1981 and 2017, the highest temperature recorded at the local weather station in the Abrami hamlet was 41.4 °C (106.5 °F), on 22 July 2015. The coldest temperature was −16.9 °C (1.6 °F), on 8 January 1985.

== Demographics ==
According to the 2021 census, its population was 35.

=== Historical population ===
Change of population
1857	1869	1880	1890	1900	1910	1921	1931	1948	1953	1961	1971	1981	1991	2001	2011	2021
0	0	68	68	67	53	0	0	89	72	51	34	32	34	34	43	35
