= RIMS =

RIMS may refer to:

== Institutions ==
- Rajendra Institute of Medical Sciences, in Ranchi, Jharkhand, India
- Rajiv Gandhi Institute of Medical Sciences (disambiguation), various institutes in India
- Regional Institute of Medical Sciences, a medical college and hospital in Manipur, India
- Research Institute for Mathematical Sciences, attached to Kyoto University in Japan
- Rhein-Main International Montessori School, a private school in Friedrichsdorf, Germany
- Risk and Insurance Management Society, a nonprofit organization dedicated to advancing risk management

== Other uses ==
- RIMS, abbreviation for Royal Indian Marine Ship
- Regional Input–Output Modeling System
- Resonance Isolation Mounting System, the original rim mount for kit drums
- Research Information Management System (RIMS) also known as Current Research Information Systems (CRIS)

== See also ==
- Rim (disambiguation)
