= Senj, Istria County =

Senj Segnacco
- Village
- Interactive map of Senj
- Location within Croatia
- Coordinates: 45.3530495°N 13.9027068°E
- Country: Croatia
- County: Istria
- Municipality: Buzet

Area
  - Total: 0.81 sq mi (2.1 km^{2})

Population (2021)
  - Total: 33
  - Density: 41/sq mi (16/km^{2})
- Time zone: UTC+1 (CET)
  - Summer (DST): UTC+2 (CEST)
- Postal code: 52420 Buzet
- Area code: 052

Senj (Italian: Segnacco) is a village in Istria, Croatia.

== Demographics ==
According to the 2021 census, its population was 33.
