= Počekaji =

Počekaji Pocecai
- Village
- Location within Croatia
- Coordinates: 45.4299712°N 13.9712171°E
- Country: Croatia
- County: Istria
- Municipality: Buzet

Area
  - Total: 0.77 sq mi (2.0 km^{2})

Population (2021)
  - Total: 40
  - Density: 52/sq mi (20/km^{2})
- Time zone: UTC+1 (CET)
  - Summer (DST): UTC+2 (CEST)
- Postal code: 52420 Buzet
- Area code: 052

Počekaji (Italian: Pocecai) is a village in Istria, Croatia.

== Demographics ==
According to the 2021 census, its population was 40.
