= Črnica =

Črnica Cernizza Pinguentina
- Village
- Location within Croatia
- Coordinates: 45.4427166°N 13.9204929°E
- Country: Croatia
- County: Istria
- Municipality: Buzet

Area
  - Total: 1.4 sq mi (3.6 km^{2})

Population (2021)
  - Total: 34
  - Density: 24/sq mi (9.4/km^{2})
- Time zone: UTC+1 (CET)
  - Summer (DST): UTC+2 (CEST)
- Postal code: 52420 Buzet
- Area code: 052

Črnica (Italian: Cernizza Pinguentina) is a village in Buzet municipality in Istria County, Croatia.

== Demographics ==
According to the 2021 census, its population was 34.
