= Škuljari =

Škuljari Scuiari
- Village
- Location within Croatia
- Coordinates: 45.4187882°N 13.9075332°E
- Country: Croatia
- County: Istria
- Municipality: Buzet

Area
  - Total: 0.73 sq mi (1.9 km^{2})

Population (2021)
  - Total: 52
  - Density: 71/sq mi (27/km^{2})
- Time zone: UTC+1 (CET)
  - Summer (DST): UTC+2 (CEST)
- Postal code: 52420 Buzet
- Area code: 052

Škuljari (Italian: Scuiari) is a village in Istria, Croatia.

== Demographics ==
According to the 2021 census, its population was 52.
