= Kris Korzeniowski =

Rowing coach

Kris Korzeniowski is a Polish-American rowing coach who has led national teams to Olympic and World Championship medals for the United States, China, and the Netherlands. He was named head coach of the United States men's Olympic rowing team for the 1984 Summer Olympics, where the U.S. M8+ won a silver medal. In 1987, the U.S. M8+ he coached won gold at the World Rowing Championships. He went on to serve as technical director of the U.S. national rowing program before coaching the Chinese and Dutch W4-s to consecutive World Championship titles in 1993 and 1994, and later coached the Dutch W2x to a silver medal at the 2000 Sydney Olympics. He rejoined USRowing's coaching staff in January 2001 and was later named the organization's Director of Coaching Education. In August 2024, he received the Order of Ikkos from the United States Olympic & Paralympic Committee for his contribution to the gold medal-winning U.S. M4- at the 2024 Paris Olympics.

== Early career ==
Korzeniowski rowed competitively for ten years in Poland before moving into coaching in his native country, working first with junior and then senior rowers; in 1972 he joined the Polish Olympic program. Before emigrating to the United States, he worked with Canada's national women's rowing team.

In 1977, Korzeniowski became the first full-time head coach of women's rowing at Princeton University, a position he held until 1981. He administered fitness testing that helped identify future Olympic medalist Anne Marden's rowing potential. Thor Nilsen invited him to Nilsen's rowing training center at Piediluco, Italy, after the two met at the 1981 World Rowing Championships.

== United States national team coach (1984–1992) ==
Korzeniowski left Piediluco in late 1983 after being named head coach of the U.S. men's Olympic rowing team for the 1984 Los Angeles Games. There, the U.S. M8+ won a silver medal, finishing 0.42 seconds behind Canada.

At the 1987 World Rowing Championships in Copenhagen, the U.S. M8+ he coached won gold. The crew was inducted into the National Rowing Foundation Hall of Fame in January 1998. Mike Teti, who rowed in that 1987 crew, later served as the U.S. men's national rowing team head coach from 1997 to 2008 and again from 2018 to 2021, and has credited Korzeniowski as a formative mentor.

The U.S. M8+ won the bronze medal at the 1988 Seoul Olympics. Korzeniowski served as U.S. Rowing's technical director from 1989 until 1992. A 2001 retrospective on his career said, "for the decade of the '80s his name was synonymous with American rowing."

== China and the Netherlands (1992–2000) ==
After leaving U.S. Rowing, Korzeniowski coached in China for two years, from 1992 to 1994, leading the Chinese W4- to gold at the 1993 World Rowing Championships in Račice, defeating the United States crew. He then moved to the Netherlands, where he coached the Dutch W4- to the world title in 1994, becoming a back-to-back world-championship-winning coach with two different national teams. He remained with the Dutch program through the 2000 Sydney Olympics, where he coached the W2x of Pieta van Dishoeck and Eeke van Nes to a silver medal, behind Germany and ahead of Lithuania. His contract with the Dutch rowing federation was not renewed after the Games.

== Return to the United States (2001–2010) ==
Korzeniowski rejoined USRowing's coaching staff in January 2001, initially covering assistant men's coach, interim women's coach, and national training program advisor duties. His technical approach has been credited as an influence on the U.S. M8+ that won Olympic gold in 2004, according to the bow seat of that crew, Jason Read. In December 2010, USRowing named him to a newly created position, Director of Coaching Education, based in Princeton, New Jersey.

== Legacy and recognition ==
In August 2024, Korzeniowski was among four coaches — including his former athlete Mike Teti — to receive the Order of Ikkos, an honor created by the U.S. Olympic & Paralympic Committee in 2008 that allows medal-winning athletes to formally recognize people instrumental to their success; Korzeniowski was nominated by members of the U.S. men's four that won gold at the 2024 Paris Olympics. According to Rowing News, he is "one of the most influential coaches in U.S. rowing."
