= Vrh, Istria County =

Vrh Vetta
- Village
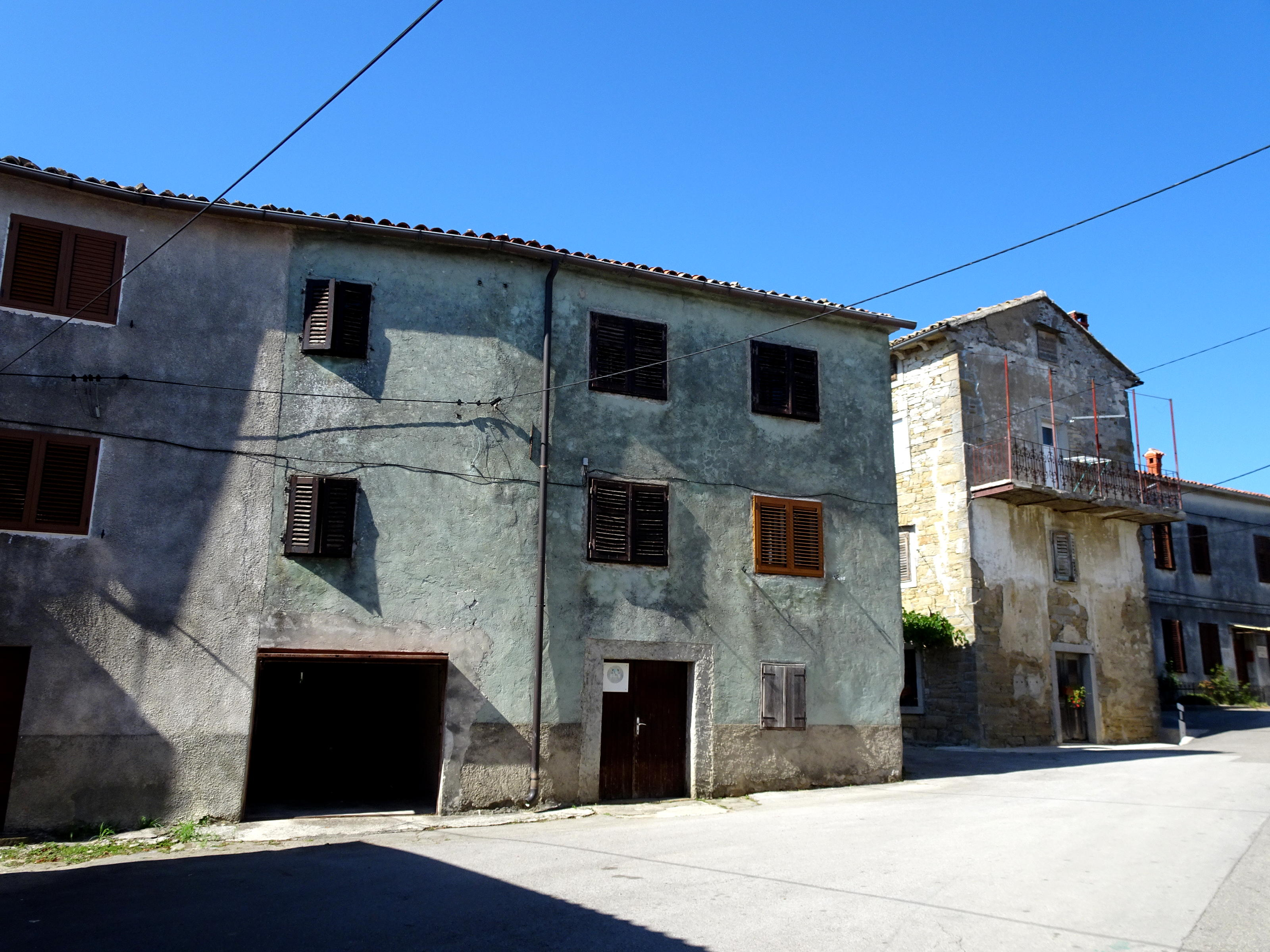

- Location within Croatia
- Country: Croatia
- County: Istria
- Municipality: Buzet

Area
  - Total: 1.2 sq mi (3.2 km^{2})

Population (2021)
  - Total: 109
  - Density: 88/sq mi (34/km^{2})
- Time zone: UTC+1 (CET)
  - Summer (DST): UTC+2 (CEST)
- Postal code: 52420 Buzet
- Area code: 052

Vrh (Italian: Vetta) is a village in Croatia.

== Demographics ==
According to the 2021 census, its population was 109. It was 124 in 2011.
