= Blatna Vas =

Settlement in Istria County, Croatia

- Settlement
- Interactive map of Blatna Vas
- Location of Blatna Vas in Croatia
- Coordinates: 45°22′34″N 14°01′30″E
- Country: Croatia
- County: Istria County
- City: Buzet

Area
  - Total: 3.8 km^{2} (1.5 sq mi)

Population (2021)
  - Total: 11
  - Density: 2.9/km^{2} (7.5/sq mi)
- Time zone: UTC+1 (CET)
  - Summer (DST): UTC+2 (CEST)
- Postal code: 52420 Buzet
- Area code: +385 (0)52

Blatna Vas is a settlement in the City of Buzet in Croatia. In 2021, its population was 11.

== Demographics ==
Blatna Vas: Population trends 1857–2021
v

population	285	310	307	271	272	271			187	169	114	41	20	12	8	7	11
	1857	1869	1880	1890	1900	1910	1921	1931	1948	1953	1961	1971	1981	1991	2001	2011	2021

Sources: Croatian Bureau of Statistics publications
