= Sveti Donat =

Sveti Donat Casa San Donato
- Village
- Location within Croatia
- Coordinates: 45.3794085°N 13.9354513°E
- Country: Croatia
- County: Istria
- Municipality: Buzet

Area
  - Total: 1.2 sq mi (3.0 km^{2})

Population (2021)
  - Total: 82
  - Density: 71/sq mi (27/km^{2})
- Time zone: UTC+1 (CET)
  - Summer (DST): UTC+2 (CEST)
- Postal code: 52420 Buzet
- Area code: 052

Sveti Donat (Italian: Casa San Donato) is a village in Istria, Croatia.

== Demographics ==
According to the 2021 census, its population was 82.
