= Kajini =

Settlement in Istria County, Croatia

- Settlement
- Interactive map of Kajini
- Location of Kajini in Croatia
- Coordinates: 45°25′05″N 13°56′31″E
- Country: Croatia
- County: Istria County
- City: Buzet

Area
  - Total: 0.7 km^{2} (0.27 sq mi)

Population (2021)
  - Total: 17
  - Density: 24/km^{2} (63/sq mi)
- Time zone: UTC+1 (CET)
  - Summer (DST): UTC+2 (CEST)
- Postal code: 52420 Buzet
- Area code: +385 (0)52

Kajini is a settlement in the City of Buzet in Croatia. In 2021, its population was 17.

== Demographics ==
Kajini: Population trends 1857–2021
v

population			57	62	54	69			66	64	43	31	24	17	15	17	17
	1857	1869	1880	1890	1900	1910	1921	1931	1948	1953	1961	1971	1981	1991	2001	2011	2021

Sources: Croatian Bureau of Statistics publications
