= Cunj =

Settlement in Istria County, Croatia

- Settlement
- Interactive map of Cunj
- Location of Cunj in Croatia
- Coordinates: 45°23′N 14°01′E
- Country: Croatia
- County: Istria County
- City: Buzet

Area
  - Total: 2.4 km^{2} (0.93 sq mi)

Population (2021)
  - Total: 15
  - Density: 6.2/km^{2} (16/sq mi)
- Time zone: UTC+1 (CET)
  - Summer (DST): UTC+2 (CEST)
- Postal code: 52420 Buzet

Cunj is a settlement in the City of Buzet in Croatia. In 2021, its population was 15.

== Demographics ==
Cunj: Population trends 1857–2021
v

population	129	140	46	48	41	54			64	58	36	16	12	16	17	19	15
	1857	1869	1880	1890	1900	1910	1921	1931	1948	1953	1961	1971	1981	1991	2001	2011	2021

Sources: Croatian Bureau of Statistics publications
