= Sovinjska Brda =

Sovinjska Brda Berda di Sovignacco
- Village
- Location within Croatia
- Coordinates: 45.3676707°N 13.8868916°E
- Country: Croatia
- County: Istria
- Municipality: Buzet

Area
  - Total: 2.2 sq mi (5.6 km^{2})

Population (2021)
  - Total: 31
  - Density: 14/sq mi (5.5/km^{2})
- Time zone: UTC+1 (CET)
  - Summer (DST): UTC+2 (CEST)
- Postal code: 52420 Buzet
- Area code: 052

Sovinjska Brda (Italian: Berda di Sovignacco) is a village in Istria, Croatia.

== Demographics ==
According to the 2021 census, its population was 31.
