= Salež =

Settlement in Istria County, Croatia

- Settlement
- Interactive map of Salež
- Location of Salež in Croatia
- Coordinates: 45°25′37″N 13°54′36″E
- Country: Croatia
- County: Istria County
- City: Buzet

Area
  - Total: 0.9 km^{2} (0.35 sq mi)

Population (2021)
  - Total: 5
  - Density: 5.6/km^{2} (14/sq mi)
- Time zone: UTC+1 (CET)
  - Summer (DST): UTC+2 (CEST)
- Postal code: 52420 Buzet
- Area code: +385 (0)52

Salež is a settlement in the City of Buzet in Croatia. In 2021, its population was 5.

== Demographics ==
Salež: Population trends 1857–2021
v

population	189	205	107	119	104	169	437	471	121	106	62	45	32	20	17	7	5
	1857	1869	1880	1890	1900	1910	1921	1931	1948	1953	1961	1971	1981	1991	2001	2011	2021

Sources: Croatian Bureau of Statistics publications
