= Peničići =

Peničići Penicici
- Village
- Location within Croatia
- Coordinates: 45.3790842°N 13.9469712°E
- Country: Croatia
- County: Istria
- Municipality: Buzet

Area
  - Total: 0.50 sq mi (1.3 km^{2})

Population (2021)
  - Total: 56
  - Density: 110/sq mi (43/km^{2})
- Time zone: UTC+1 (CET)
  - Summer (DST): UTC+2 (CEST)
- Postal code: 52420 Buzet
- Area code: 052

Peničići (Italian: Penicici) is a village in Istria, Croatia.

== Demographics ==
According to the 2021 census, its population was 56.
