= Rim (novel) =

1994 novel by Alexander Besher

Rim: A Novel of Virtual Reality
- 1994 first edition (hardcover)
- Author: Alexander Besher
- Language: English
- Series: Rim trilogy
- Genre: Science fiction
- Publisher: HarperCollins
- Publication date: 1994
- Publication place: United States
- Media type: Print (hardback & paperback)
- Pages: 357 pp
- ISBN: 0-06-258527-4
- OCLC: 30075186
- Dewey Decimal: 813/.54 20
- LC Class: PS3552.E7942 R56 1994
- Followed by: Mir

Rim: A Novel of Virtual Reality, often shortened to Rim (1994) is a novel by American writer Alexander Besher. Set in the near future where virtual reality has dominated the economy and popular culture (much like today's internet), commercial space travel is commonplace, and orbiting space hotels surpass the complexity of even the International Space Station, it follows the story of former psychic detective Frank Gobi and his son Trevor as they solve the mystery of a VR crash that leaves millions of people in a trancelike state.

The novel takes place in the year 2027. Its sequels Mir and Chi take place in 2036 and 2038, respectively.
