= Račice (Žďár nad Sázavou District) =

- Municipality
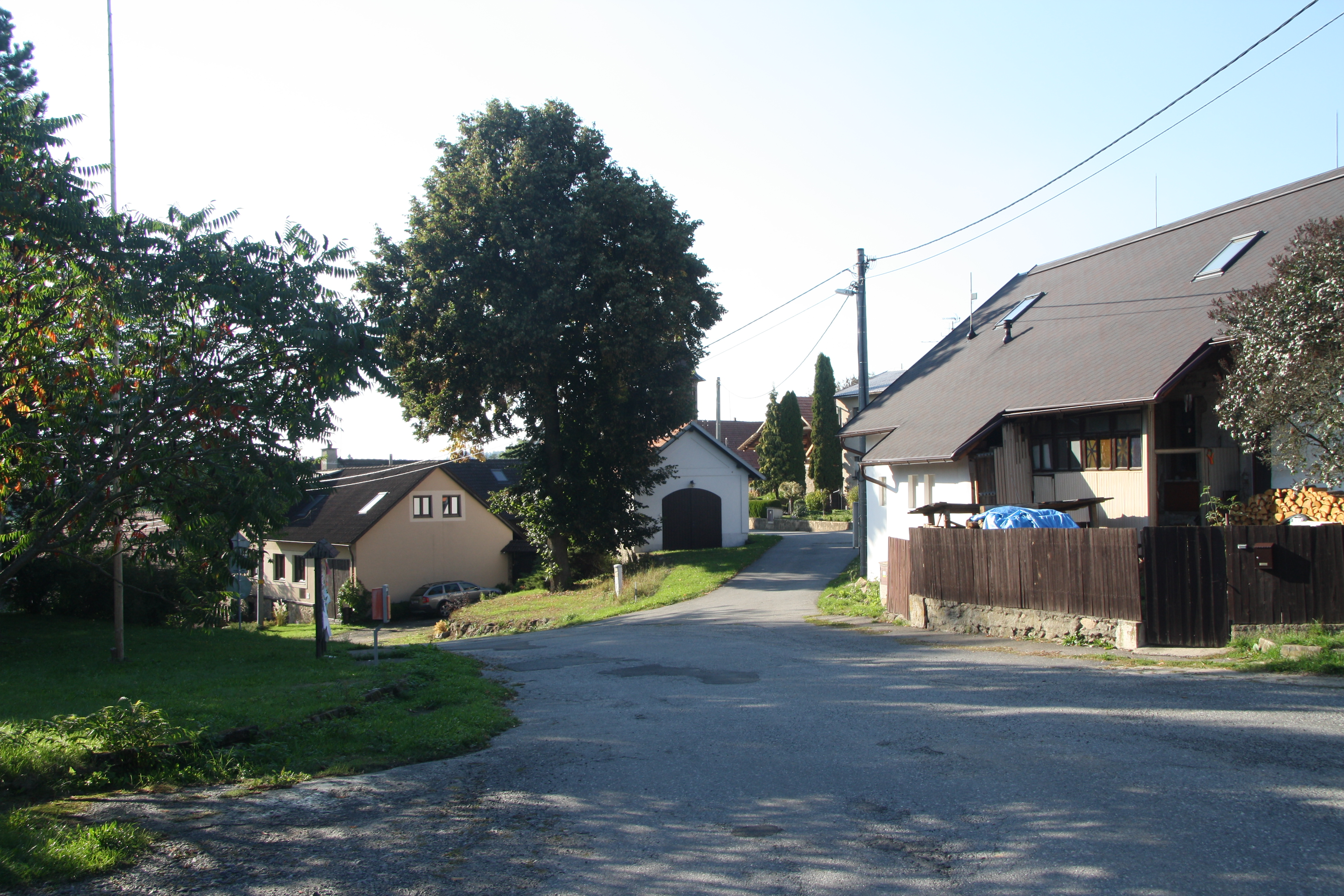
- Centre of Račice

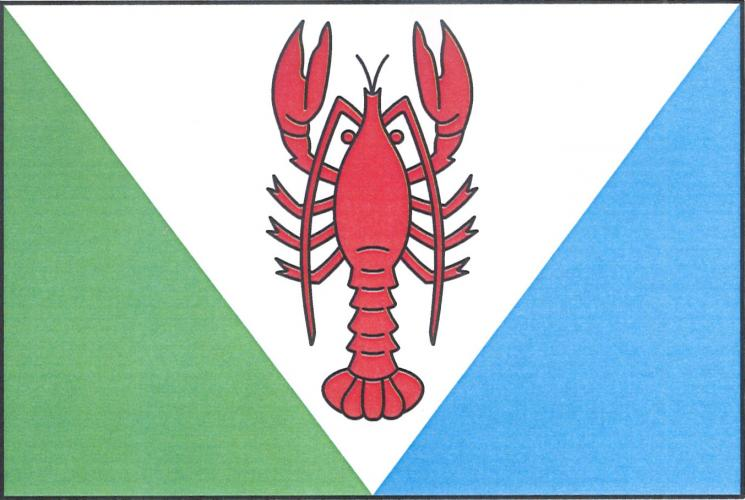
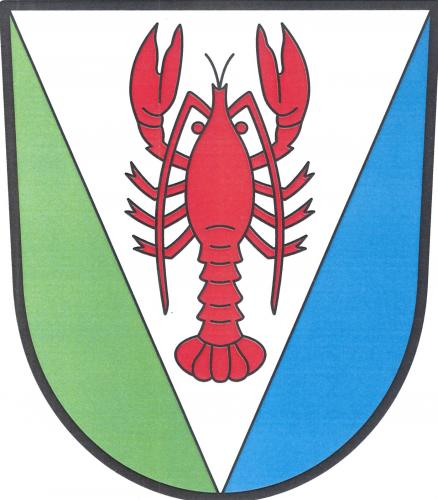
- Flag Coat of arms

- Location in the Czech Republic
- Coordinates: 49°29′50″N 16°8′21″E
- Country: Czech Republic
- Region: Vysočina
- District: Žďár nad Sázavou
- First mentioned: 1462

Area
  - Total: 2.68 km^{2} (1.03 sq mi)
- Elevation: 544 m (1,785 ft)

Population (2026-01-01)
  - Total: 49
  - Density: 18/km^{2} (47/sq mi)
- Time zone: UTC+1 (CET)
  - Summer (DST): UTC+2 (CEST)
- Postal code: 592 55
- Website: www.racice.net

Račice is a municipality and village in Žďár nad Sázavou District in the Vysočina Region of the Czech Republic. It has about 50 inhabitants.

Račice lies approximately 17 kilometres (11 mi) south-east of Žďár nad Sázavou, 42 km (26 mi) east of Jihlava, and 140 km (87 mi) south-east of Prague.

== Demographics ==
Historical population
Year	Pop.	±%
1869	143	—
1880	156	+9.1%
1890	147	−5.8%
1900	156	+6.1%
1910	160	+2.6%
1921	148	−7.5%
1930	128	−13.5%
1950	107	−16.4%
1961	92	−14.0%
1970	76	−17.4%
1980	61	−19.7%
1991	53	−13.1%
2001	53	+0.0%
2011	54	+1.9%
2021	51	−5.6%
Source: Censuses
