= Ročko Polje =

Ročko Polje Poglie di Rozzo
- Village
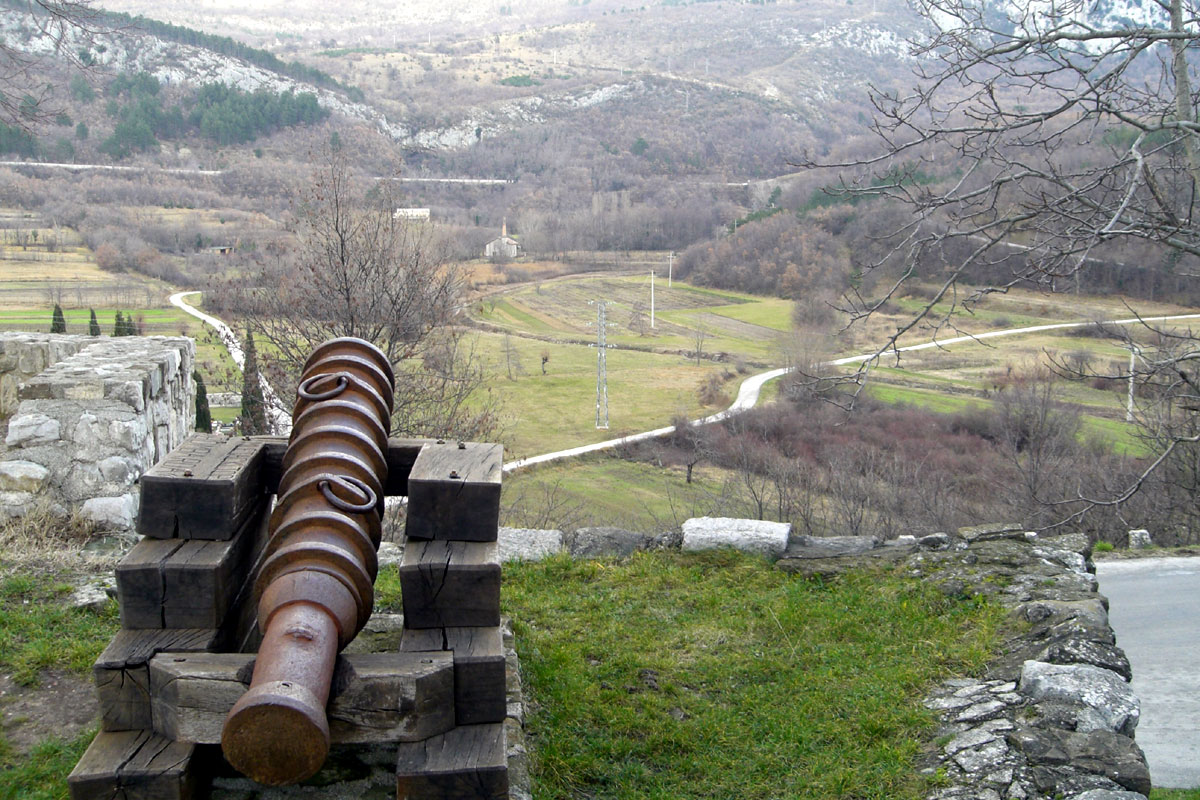

- Location within Croatia
- Coordinates: 45.3755199°N 14.047893°E
- Country: Croatia
- County: Istria
- Municipality: Buzet

Area
  - Total: 1.3 sq mi (3.3 km^{2})

Population (2021)
  - Total: 166
  - Density: 130/sq mi (50/km^{2})
- Time zone: UTC+1 (CET)
  - Summer (DST): UTC+2 (CEST)
- Postal code: 52420 Buzet
- Area code: 052

Ročko Polje (Italian: Poglie di Rozzo) is a village in Istria, Croatia.

== Demographics ==
According to the 2021 census, its population was 166.
