= Podkuk =

Podkuk Piedicucco
- Village
- Location within Croatia
- Coordinates: 45°22′N 13°59′E
- Country: Croatia

Population (2011)
  - Total: 1
- Time zone: UTC+1 (CET)
  - Summer (DST): UTC+2 (CEST)

Podkuk (Italian: Piedicucco) is a village in Croatia. It has 1 resident according to the 2011 Census.
