= Strana, Croatia =

Strana
- Village
- Location within Croatia
- Coordinates: 45.4110767°N 13.986254°E
- Country: Croatia
- County: Istria
- Municipality: Buzet

Area
  - Total: 1.0 sq mi (2.7 km^{2})

Population (2021)
  - Total: 46
  - Density: 44/sq mi (17/km^{2})
- Time zone: UTC+1 (CET)
  - Summer (DST): UTC+2 (CEST)
- Postal code: 52420 Buzet
- Area code: 052

Strana is a village in Istria, Croatia.

== Demographics ==
According to the 2021 census, its population was 46.
