= Prodani, Croatia =

Prodani Prodani di Pinguente
- Village
- Location within Croatia
- Coordinates: 45.3746394°N 13.9771894°E
- Country: Croatia
- County: Istria
- Municipality: Buzet

Area
  - Total: 2.0 sq mi (5.1 km^{2})

Population (2021)
  - Total: 77
  - Density: 39/sq mi (15/km^{2})
- Time zone: UTC+1 (CET)
  - Summer (DST): UTC+2 (CEST)
- Postal code: 52420 Buzet
- Area code: 052

Prodani (Italian: Prodani di Pinguente) is a village in Istria, Croatia.

== Demographics ==
According to the 2021 census, its population was 77.
