= Račice nad Trotinou =

- Municipality
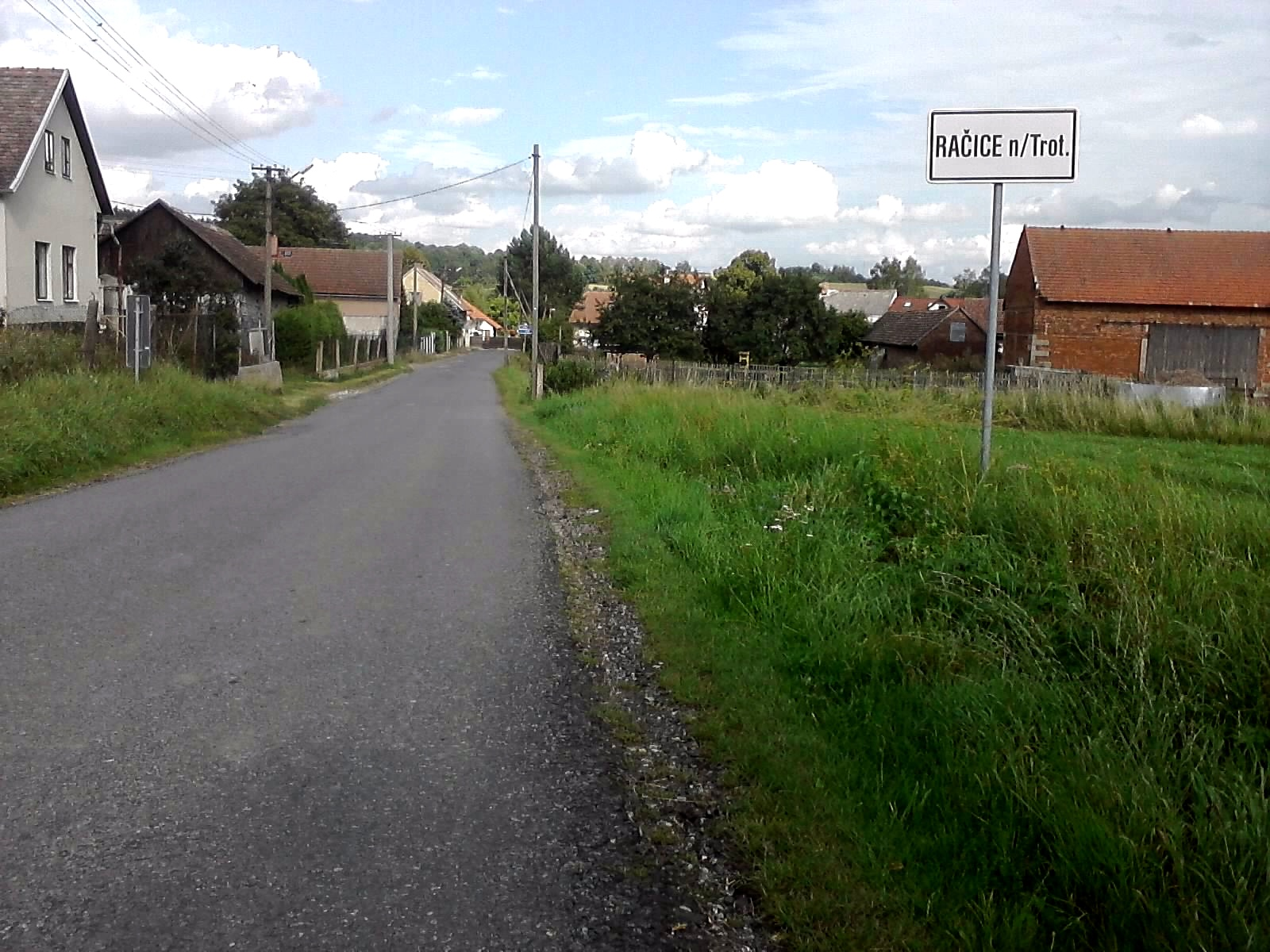
- Entrance to Račice nad Trotinou

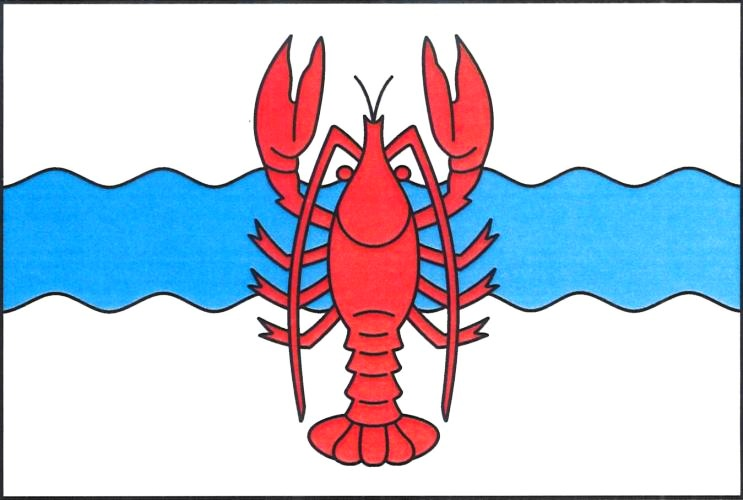
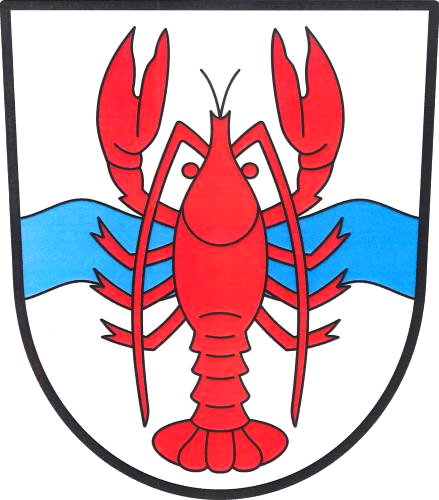
- Flag Coat of arms

- Location in the Czech Republic
- Coordinates: 50°18′57″N 15°47′46″E
- Country: Czech Republic
- Region: Hradec Králové
- District: Hradec Králové
- First mentioned: 1437

Area
  - Total: 6.91 km^{2} (2.67 sq mi)
- Elevation: 250 m (820 ft)

Population (2026-01-01)
  - Total: 153
  - Density: 22.1/km^{2} (57.3/sq mi)
- Time zone: UTC+1 (CET)
  - Summer (DST): UTC+2 (CEST)
- Postal code: 503 03
- Website: www.racicenadtrotinou.cz

Račice nad Trotinou is a municipality and village in Hradec Králové District in the Hradec Králové Region of the Czech Republic. It has about 200 inhabitants.

== Demographics ==
Historical population
Year	Pop.	±%
1869	565	—
1880	560	−0.9%
1890	574	+2.5%
1900	486	−15.3%
1910	510	+4.9%
1921	497	−2.5%
1930	445	−10.5%
1950	285	−36.0%
1961	296	+3.9%
1970	263	−11.1%
1980	195	−25.9%
1991	153	−21.5%
2001	145	−5.2%
2011	141	−2.8%
2021	151	+7.1%
Source: Censuses
