= Giovanni Domenico Paladini =

Italian painter (1721–1772)

Giovanni Domenico Paladini (Lucca, 1721 - Lucca, 1772) was an Italian painter.

== Biography ==
He trained under Giovanni Domenico Lombardi. He painted figures, animals, and still-life. He was also an actor in comedies.
