= Strana (newspaper) =

Strana (Страна, English: Country) was a liberal-bourgeois daily newspaper published in St. Petersburg, Russia, in 1906 and 1907.
