= Perci (Buzet) =

Perci Perzi
- Village
- Location within Croatia
- Coordinates: 45.441667°N 13.93611°E
- Country: Croatia
- County: Istria
- Municipality: Buzet

Area
  - Total: 1.2 sq mi (3.1 km^{2})
- Elevation: 545 ft (166 m)

Population (2021)
  - Total: 43
  - Density: 36/sq mi (14/km^{2})
- Time zone: UTC+1 (CET)
  - Summer (DST): UTC+2 (CEST)
- Postal code: 52420 Buzet
- Area code: 052

Perci (Italian: Perzi) is a village in Istria County, Croatia. Administratively it belongs to Buzet.

== Geography ==
It lies at the centre of Northern Istria Peninsula, 24 km from Pazin and 5 km from the centre of the settlement. It is at the border with Slovenia.

== Demographics ==
According to the 2021 census, its population was 43.

=== Historical population ===
Lakosság változása
1857	1869	1880	1890	1900	1910	1921	1931	1948	1953	1961	1971	1981	1991	2001	2011	2021
0	0	148	155	166	190	0	0	135	127	99	87	75	62	58	52	43
