= Rim, Istria County =

Rim Roma
- Village
- Location within Croatia
- Coordinates: 45.3902454°N 14.0394062°E
- Country: Croatia
- County: Istria
- Municipality: Buzet

Area
  - Total: 0.42 sq mi (1.1 km^{2})

Population (2021)
  - Total: 28
  - Density: 66/sq mi (25/km^{2})
- Time zone: UTC+1 (CET)
  - Summer (DST): UTC+2 (CEST)
- Postal code: 52420 Buzet
- Area code: 052

Rim (Italian: Roma) is a village in Istria, Croatia.

== Demographics ==
According to the 2021 census, its population was 28.
