= Račice, Croatia =

Račice Racizze
- Village
- Location within Croatia
- Coordinates: 45.3552833°N 13.9717357°E
- Country: Croatia
- County: Istria
- Municipality: Buzet

Area
  - Total: 1.1 sq mi (2.9 km^{2})

Population (2021)
  - Total: 43
  - Density: 38/sq mi (15/km^{2})
- Time zone: UTC+1 (CET)
  - Summer (DST): UTC+2 (CEST)
- Postal code: 52420 Buzet
- Area code: 052

Račice (Italian: Racizze) is a village in Istria, Croatia.

== Demographics ==
According to the 2021 census, its population was 43.
