= Čiritež =

Čiritež Cirités
- Village
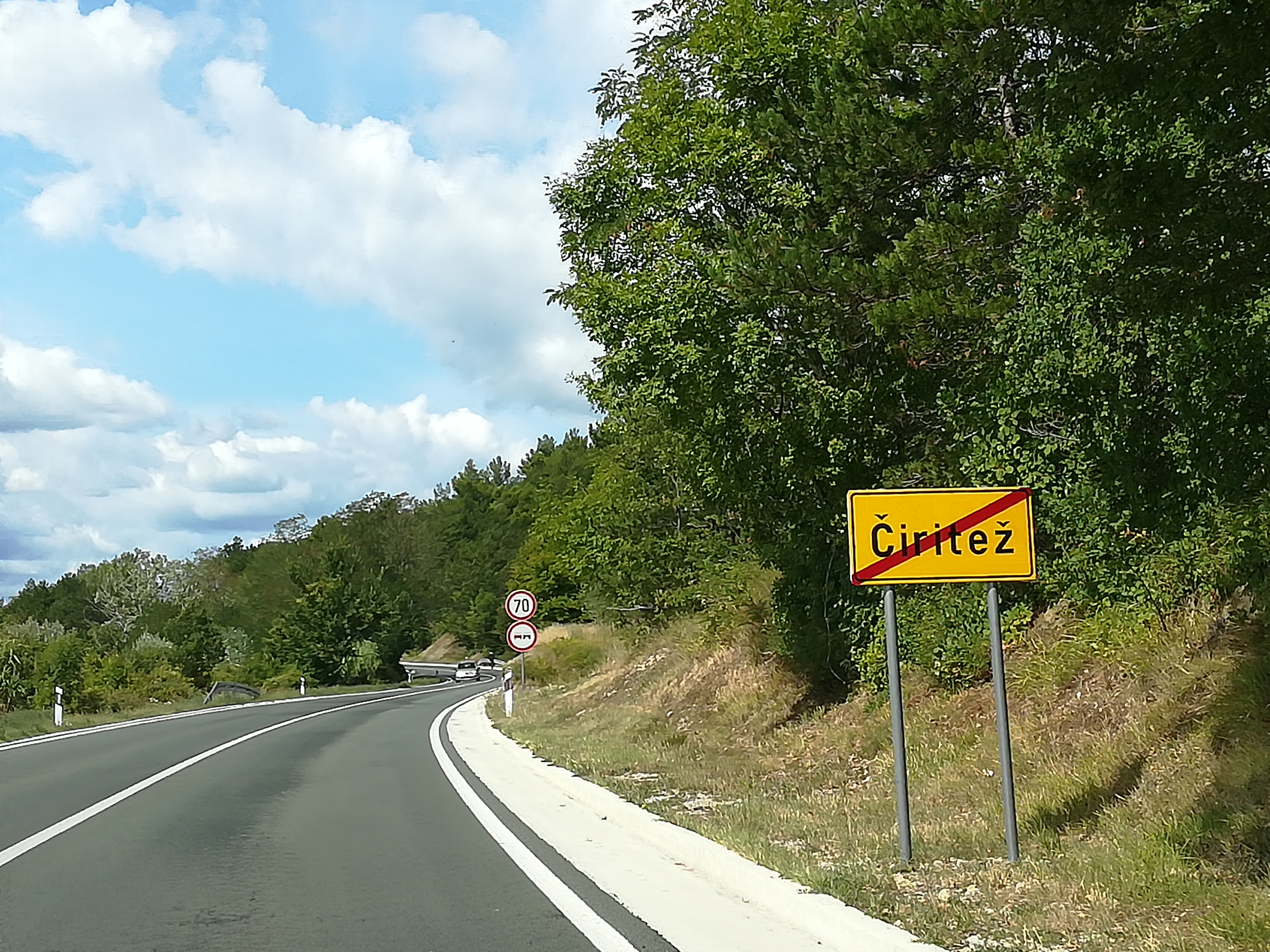

- Location within Croatia
- Coordinates: 45.3991489°N 14.0187884°E
- Country: Croatia
- County: Istria
- Municipality: Buzet

Area
  - Total: 0.85 sq mi (2.2 km^{2})

Population (2021)
  - Total: 45
  - Density: 53/sq mi (20/km^{2})
- Time zone: UTC+1 (CET)
  - Summer (DST): UTC+2 (CEST)
- Postal code: 52420 Buzet
- Area code: 052

Čiritež (Italian: Cirités) is a village in Buzet municipality in Istria County, Croatia.

== Demographics ==
According to the 2021 census, its population was 45.
