= Selca, Istria County =

Selca Selsa
- Village
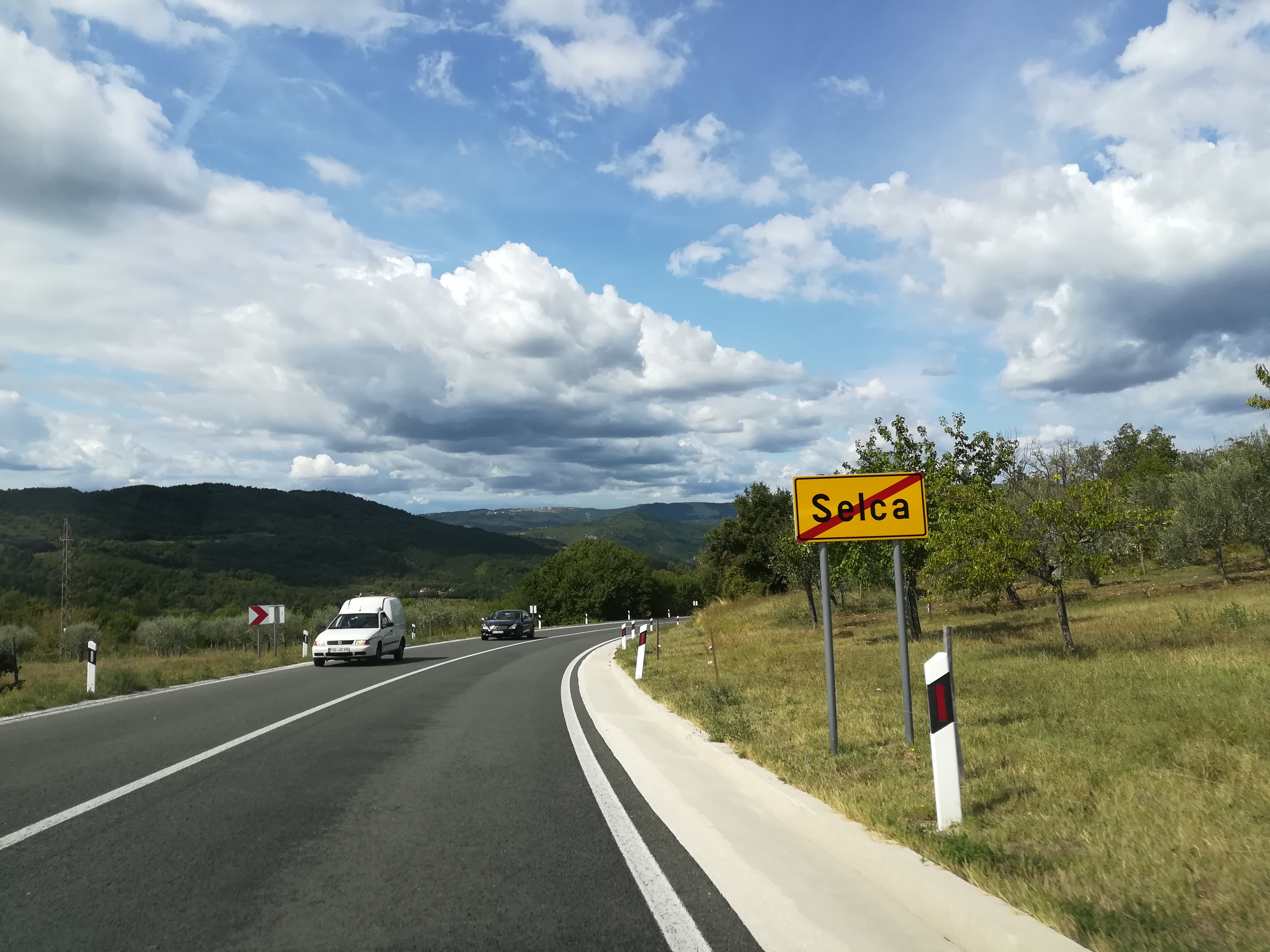

- Location within Croatia
- Coordinates: 45.3953157°N 13.9891373°E
- Country: Croatia
- County: Istria
- Municipality: Buzet

Area
  - Total: 0.31 sq mi (0.8 km^{2})

Population (2021)
  - Total: 51
  - Density: 170/sq mi (64/km^{2})
- Time zone: UTC+1 (CET)
  - Summer (DST): UTC+2 (CEST)
- Postal code: 52420 Buzet
- Area code: 052

Selca (Italian: Selsa) is a village in Istria, Croatia.

== Demographics ==
According to the 2021 census, its population was 51.
