= Sveti Ivan, Buzet =

Sveti Ivan San Giovanni
- Village
- Location within Croatia
- Coordinates: 45.4017316°N 13.9761866°E
- Country: Croatia
- County: Istria
- Municipality: Buzet

Area
  - Total: 1.1 sq mi (2.8 km^{2})

Population (2021)
  - Total: 265
  - Density: 250/sq mi (95/km^{2})
- Time zone: UTC+1 (CET)
  - Summer (DST): UTC+2 (CEST)
- Postal code: 52420 Buzet
- Area code: 052

Sveti Ivan (Italian: San Giovanni) is a village in Istria, Croatia.

== Demographics ==
According to the 2021 census, its population was 265.
