= Buzet =

Buzet Pinguente
- Town
- Town of Buzet; Grad Buzet; Città di Pinguente
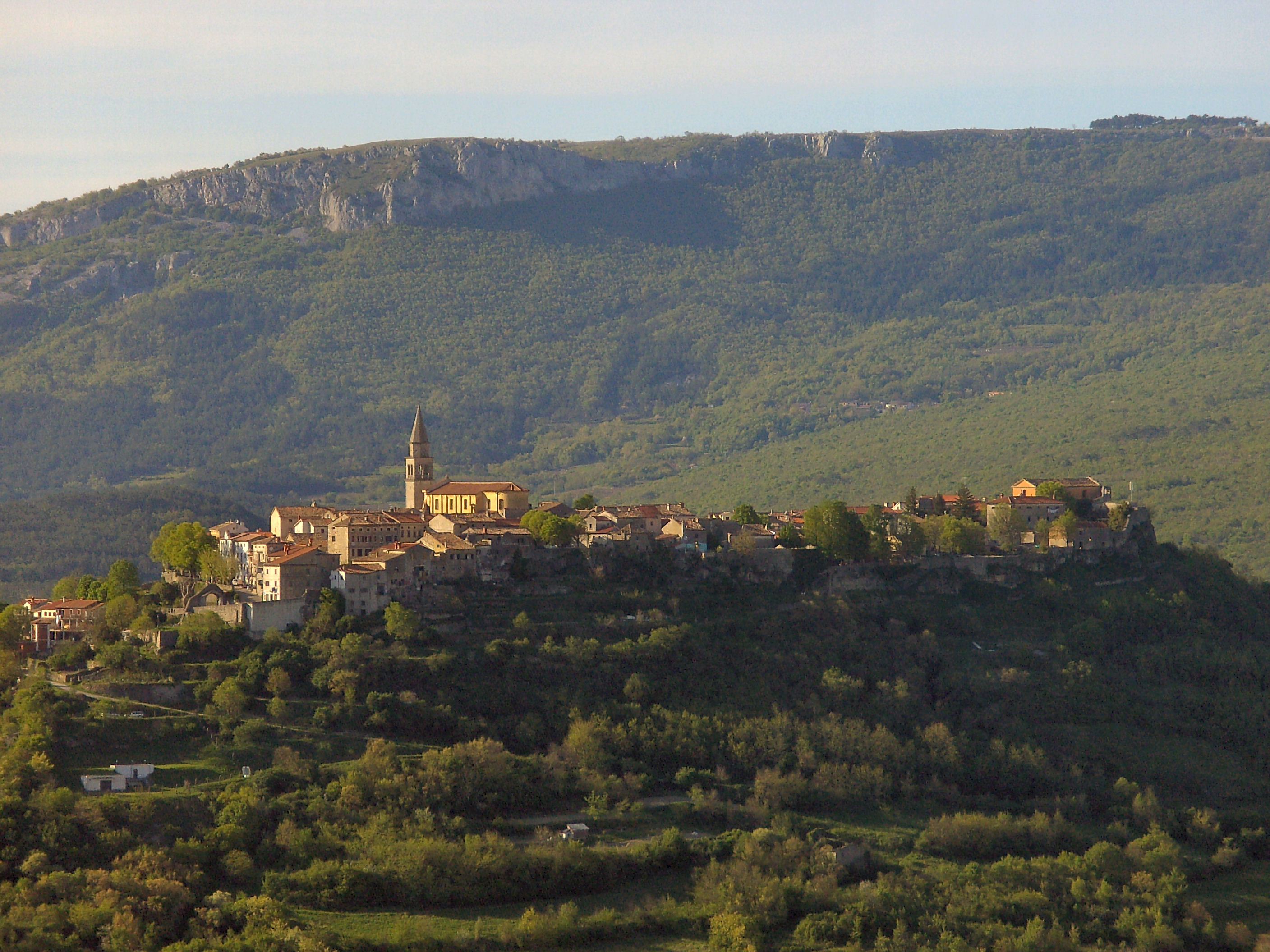
- View of Buzet

- Flag

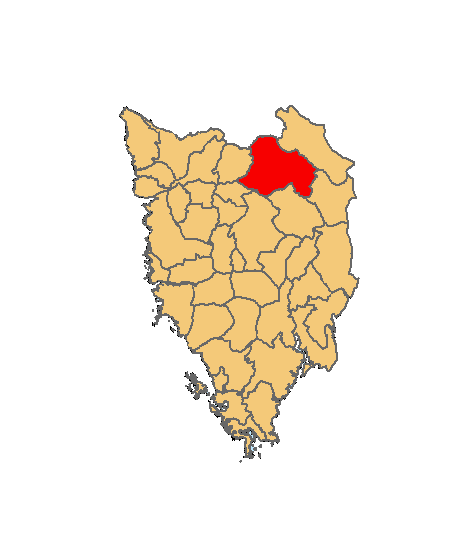
- Location of Buzet municipality in Istria

- Location within Croatia
- Coordinates: 45°25′N 13°58′E
- Country: Croatia
- Region: Istria
- County: Istria County

Government
  - Type: Mayor-Council
  - Mayor: Damir Kajin (SDP)

Area
  - Town: 65.3 sq mi (169.0 km^{2})
  - Urban: 2.6 sq mi (6.7 km^{2})

Population (2021)
  - Town: 5,999
  - Density: 91.94/sq mi (35.50/km^{2})
  - Urban: 2,339
  - Urban density: 900/sq mi (350/km^{2})
- Time zone: UTC+1 (CET)
  - Summer (DST): UTC+2 (CEST)
- Postal code: 52420 Buzet
- Area code: 052
- Website: buzet.hr

Buzet (Croatian: [bǔzet]; Italian: Pinguente; Latin: Piquentum) is a town in Istria, west Croatia, population 6,133 (2011). The historical core of Buzet dates back to the Middle Ages, and today Buzet is known as the town of truffles. Buzet is also known as the home of Croatian motorsport, and every year the "Buzetskidani" hill climb race is held here. It is currently part of the European Hill Climb Championship.

== History ==
Already at the time of Venetian rule, Buzet supplied military stations and the local population with potable water.

== Geography ==
A few kilometers to the west is the ancient castle of Pietrapelosa.

The Buzetskki kanjon is located by Selce, opposite the cliffs of Pengari, whose northern portion lie below a slope called Ponikve.

== Demographics ==
According to the 2021 census, its population was 5,999 with 2,339 living in the town proper.

In 2011 the total municipal population was 6,133 people, distributed in the following settlements (with population shown in parentheses):

Baredine (43), Bartolići (43), Barušići (95), Benčići (uninhabited), Blatna Vas (7), Brnobići (52), Buzet (1,679), Cunj (19), Čiritež (76), Črnica (45), Duričići (2), Erkovčići (43), Forčići (22), Gornja Nugla (76), Hum (30), Juradi (75), Juričići (88), Kajini (17), Klarići (39), Kompanj (36), Kosoriga (19), Kotli (1), Kras (12), Krbavčići (58), Krkuž (19), Krti (80), Krušvari (72), Mala Huba (68), Mali Mlun (64), Marčenegla (100), Marinci (49), Martinci (20), Medveje (31), Negnar (21), Paladini (47), Pengari (22), Peničići (46), Perci (52), Počekaji (41), Podkuk (1), Podrebar (12), Pračana (98), Prodani (71), Račice (16), Račički Brijeg (51), Rim (36), Rimnjak (19), Roč (153), Ročko Polje (173), Salež (7), Selca (60), Seljaci (19), Senj (24), Sirotići (13), Sovinjak (27), Sovinjska Brda (23), Sovinjsko Polje (22), Stanica Roč (63), Strana (56), Sušići (6), Sveti Donat (83), Sveti Ivan (227), Sveti Martin (1,011), Šćulci (39), Škuljari (47), Štrped (189), Ugrini (48), Veli Mlun (63), Vrh (124)

Town of Buzet: Population trends 1857–2021
v

population	7525	8158	9250	9804	10686	11562	12984	10496	9521	8838	7088	5895	6168	6295	6059	6133	5999
	1857	1869	1880	1890	1900	1910	1921	1931	1948	1953	1961	1971	1981	1991	2001	2011	2021

Sources: Croatian Bureau of Statistics publications

Historical population of Buzet
Year	Pop.	±%
1880	9,250	—
1890	9,804	+6.0%
1900	10,686	+9.0%
1910	11,562	+8.2%
1921	12,984	+12.3%
1931	10,496	−19.2%
1948	9,521	−9.3%
1953	8,838	−7.2%
1961	7,088	−19.8%
1971	5,895	−16.8%
1981	6,168	+4.6%
1991	6,295	+2.1%
2001	6,059	−3.7%
2011	6,133	+1.2%
2021	5,999	−2.2%
Source: Naselja i stanovništvo Republike Hrvatske 1857–2001, DZS, Zagreb, 2005

== Gallery ==
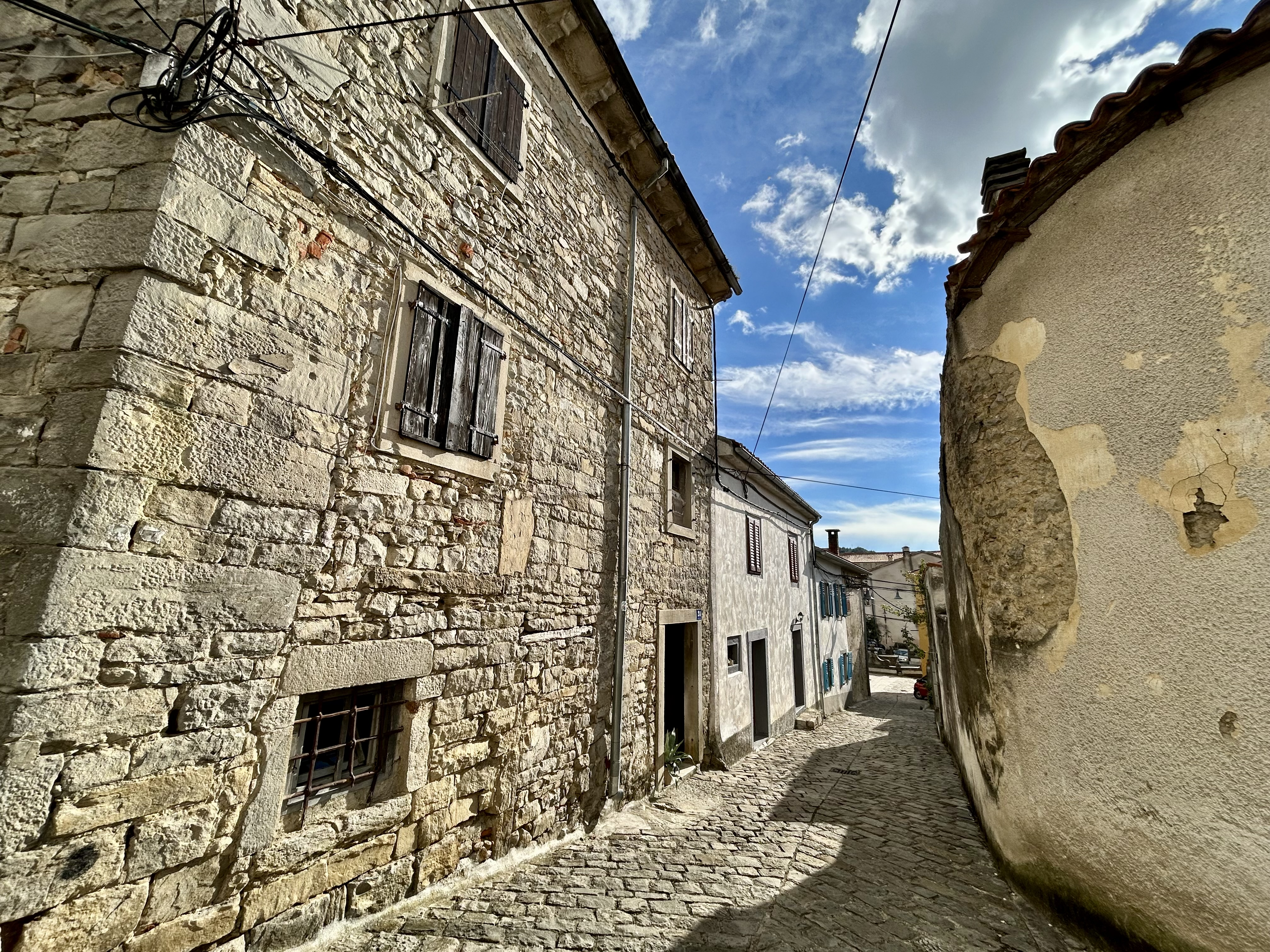
Buzet Old Town

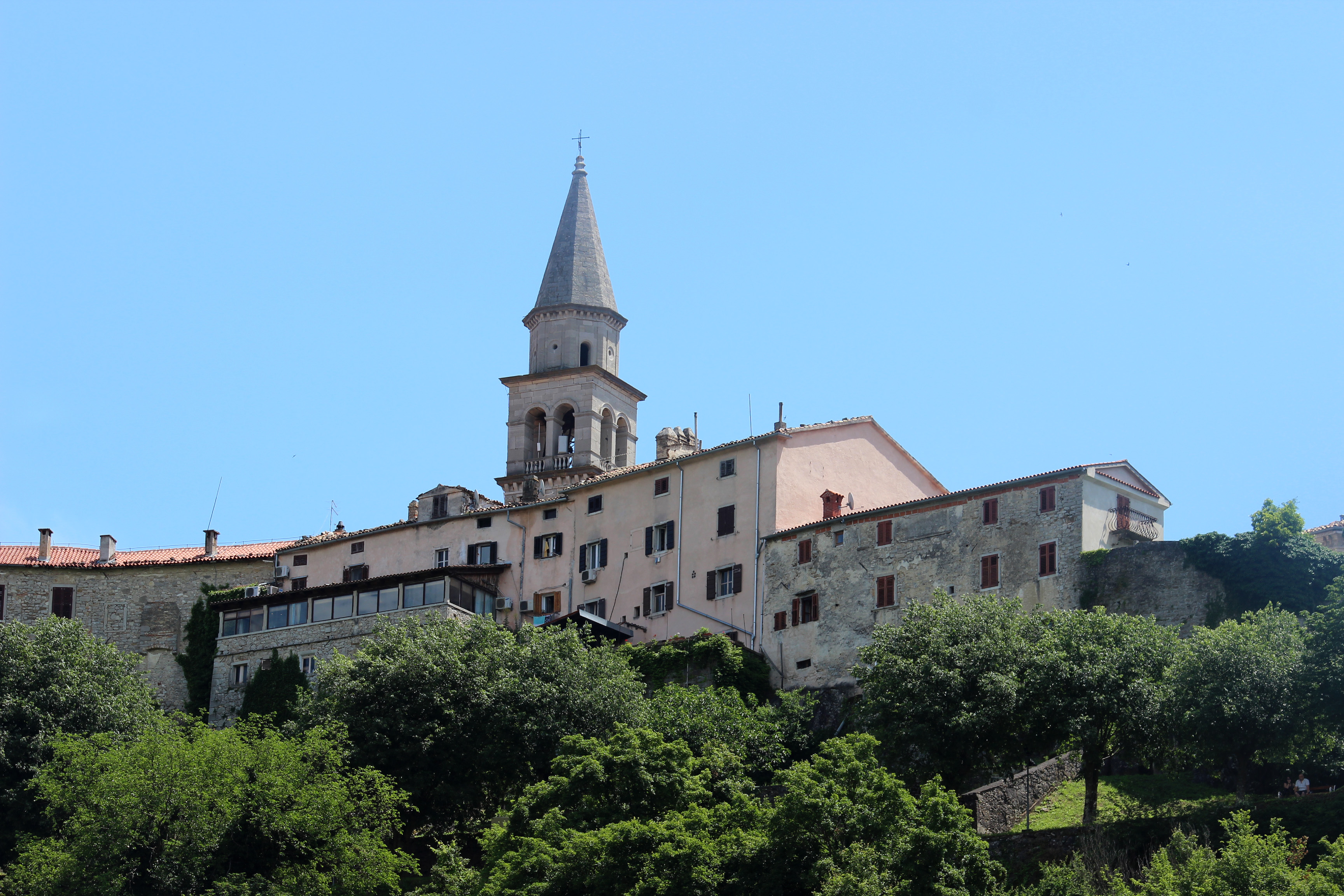
Parish Church of the Blessed Virgin Mary

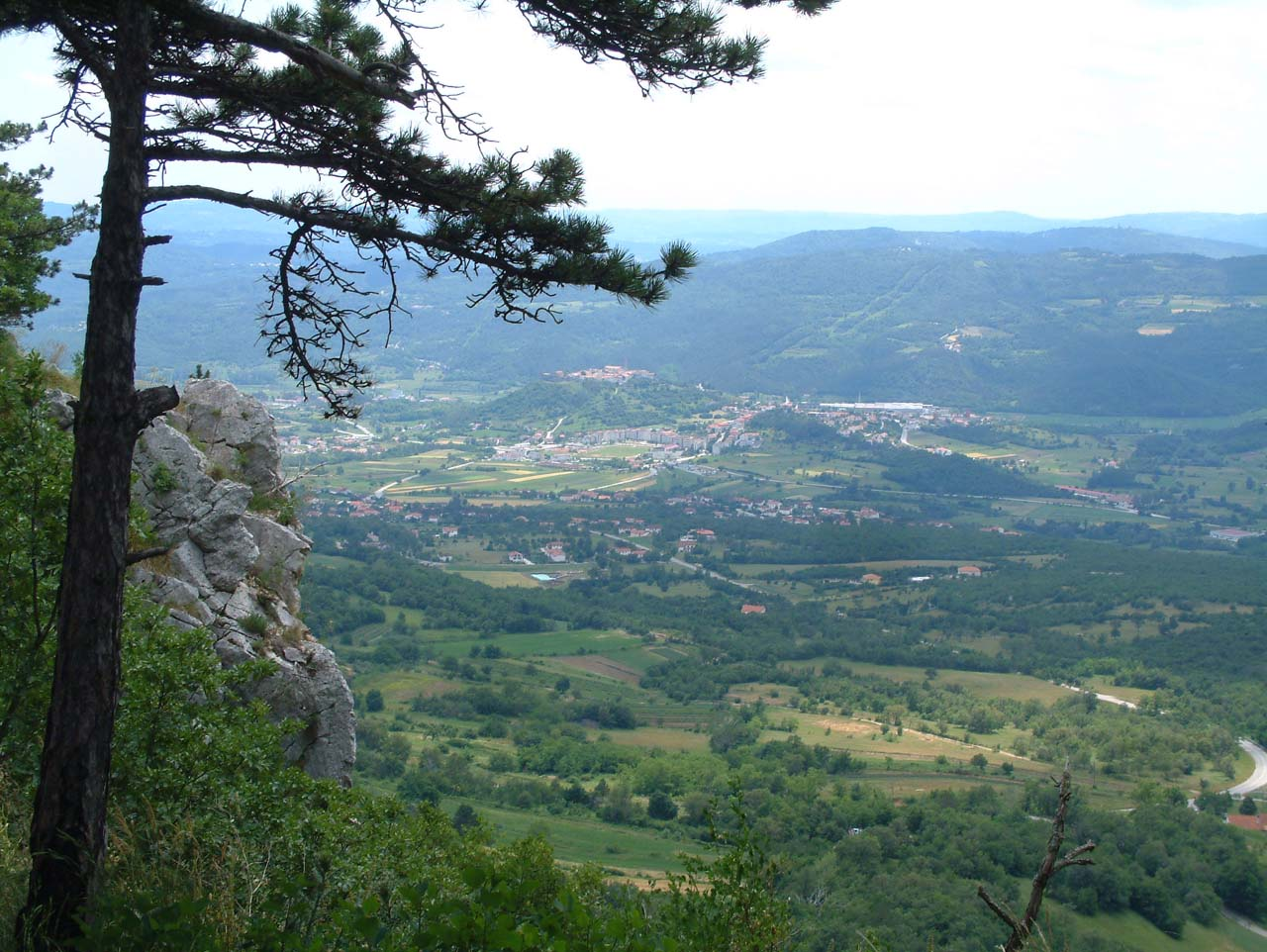
Town and surrounding landscape

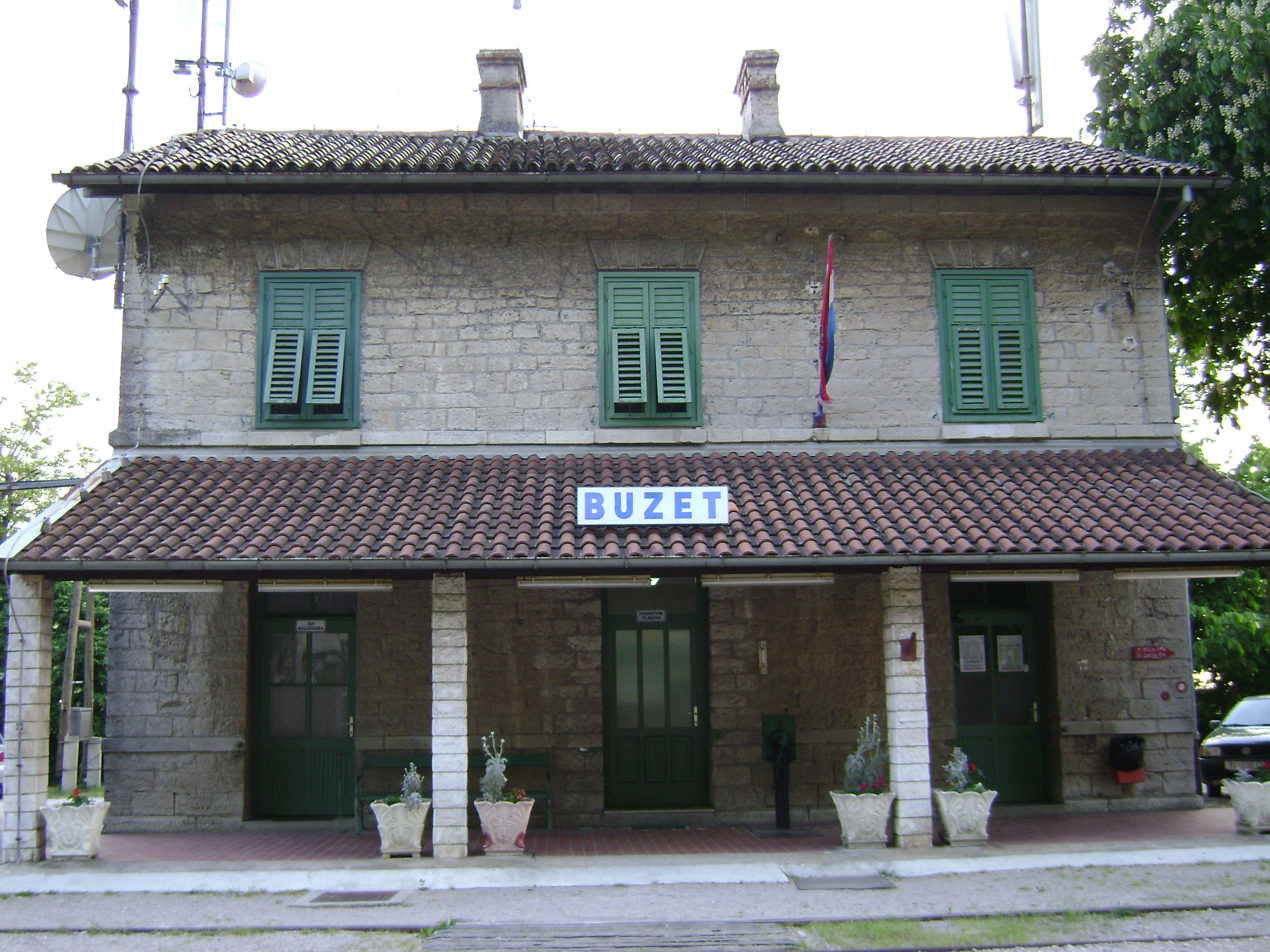
Railway station

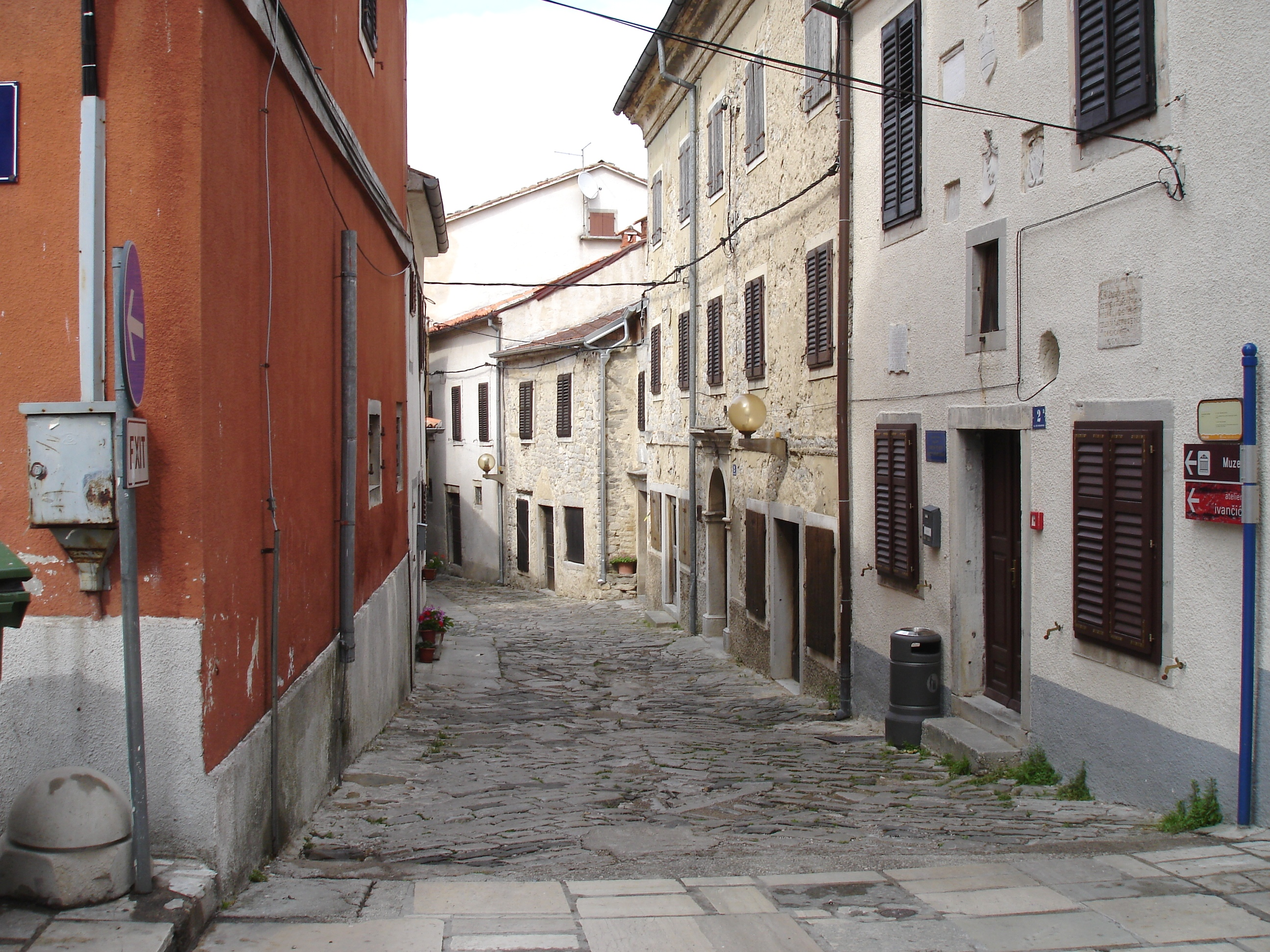
Street in Buzet

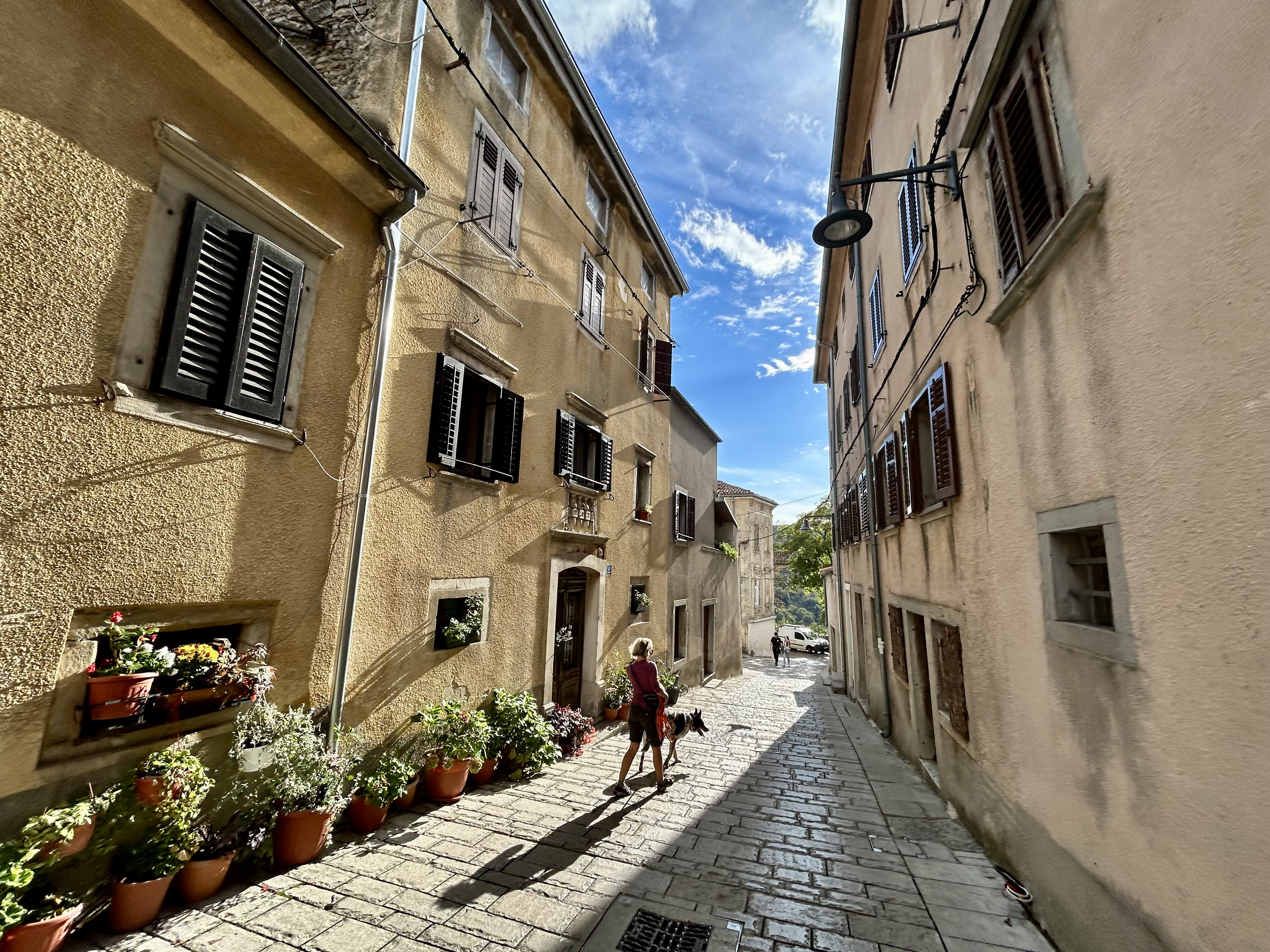
Buzet old town

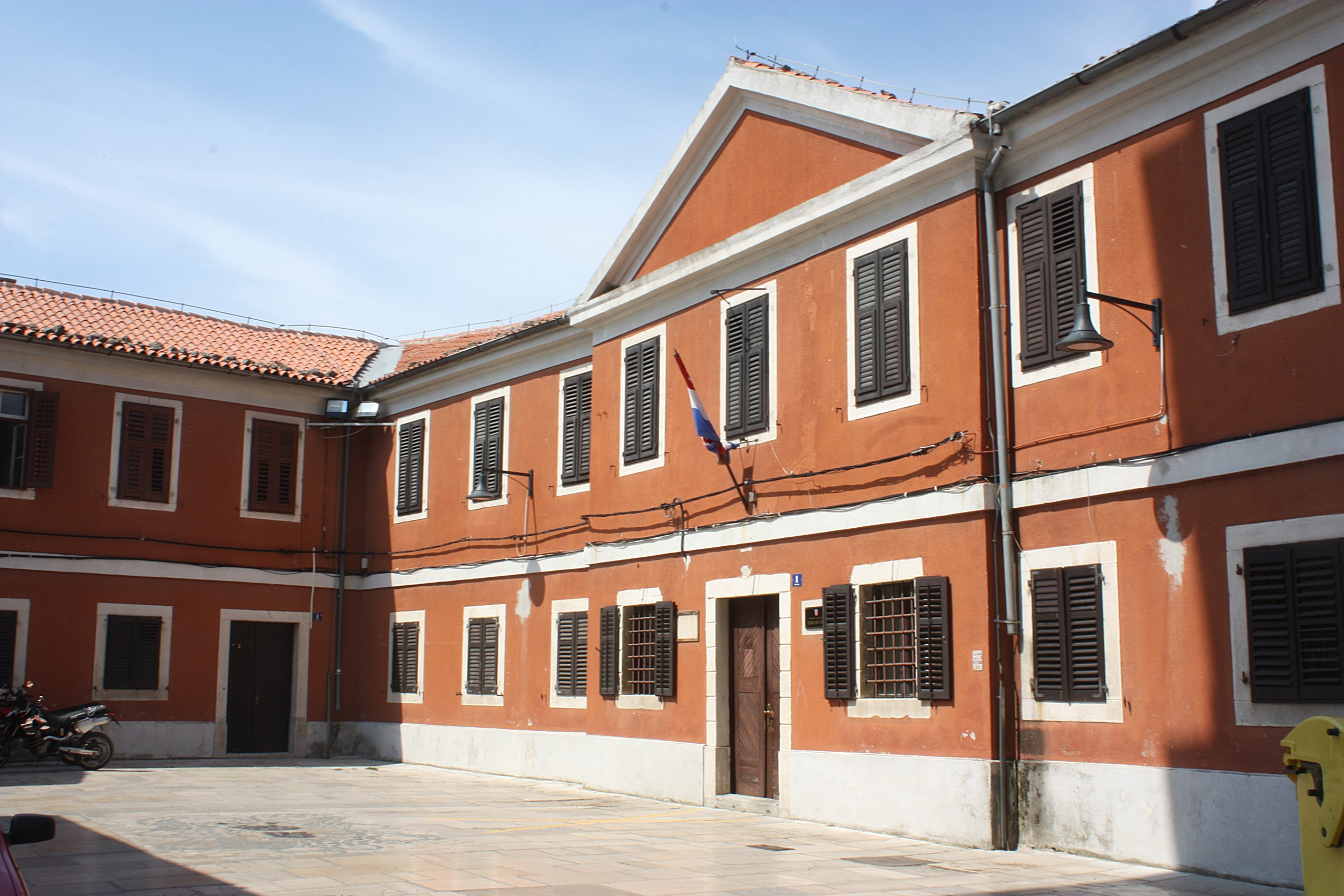
Buzet Court Hall

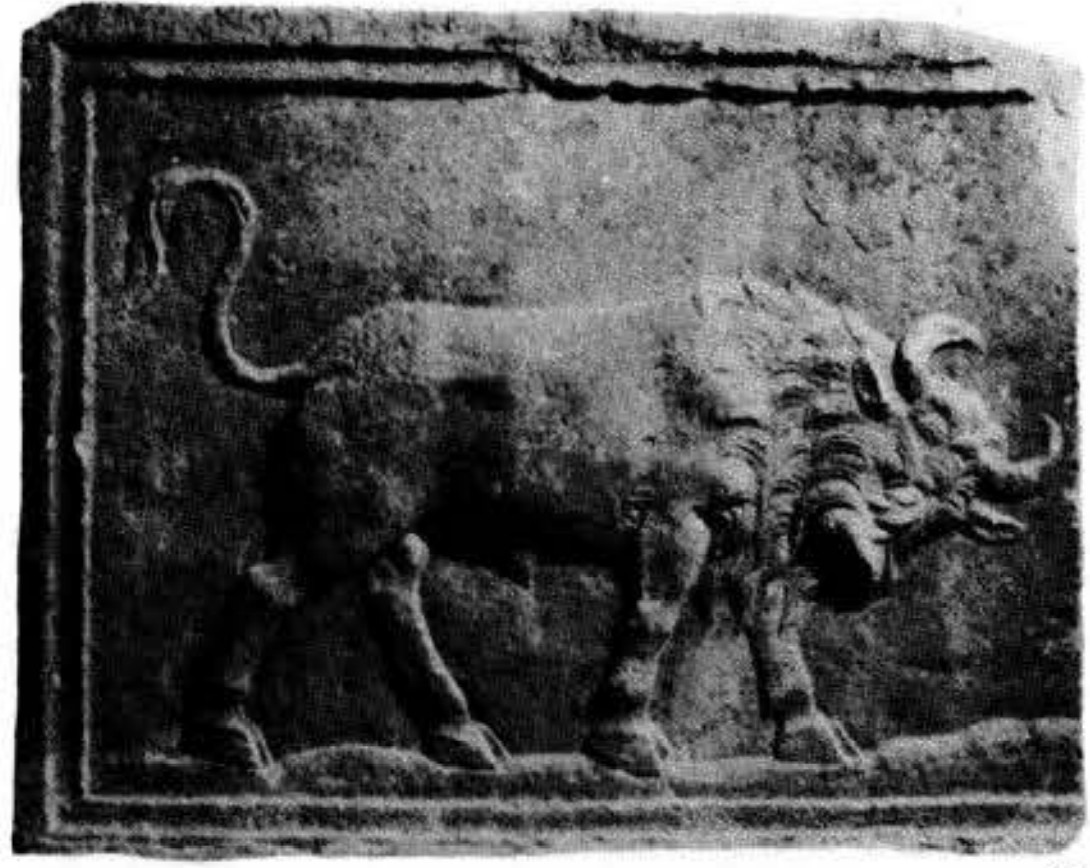
Roman tombstone with bas-relief depicting a bull, 1st century AD
