= Albergo diurno Venezia =

Coordinates: 45°28′30.05″N 9°12′18.46″E

Albergo Diurno Venezia
- Albergo Diurno Venezia
- Interactive map of the Albergo Diurno Venezia area

General information
- Status: in restoration
- Type: Public bath
- Architectural style: Art Deco
- Location: Milan, Italy, Piazza Oberdan
- Current tenants: FAI
- Construction started: 1923
- Completed: 1926
- Opened: 1926
- Owner: Milan Municipality

Technical details
- Floor area: 1200 square metres (12,900 square feet)

Design and construction
- Architect: Piero Portaluppi

Website
- FAI

The Albergo diurno Venezia is a structure built under Piazza Oberdan in Milan, on the western side towards Via Tadino.

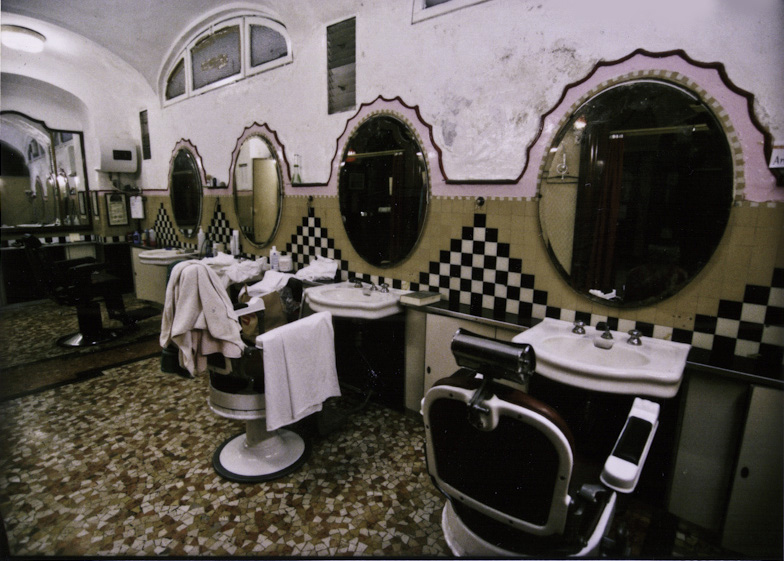
Inside - the barber's shop

== History ==
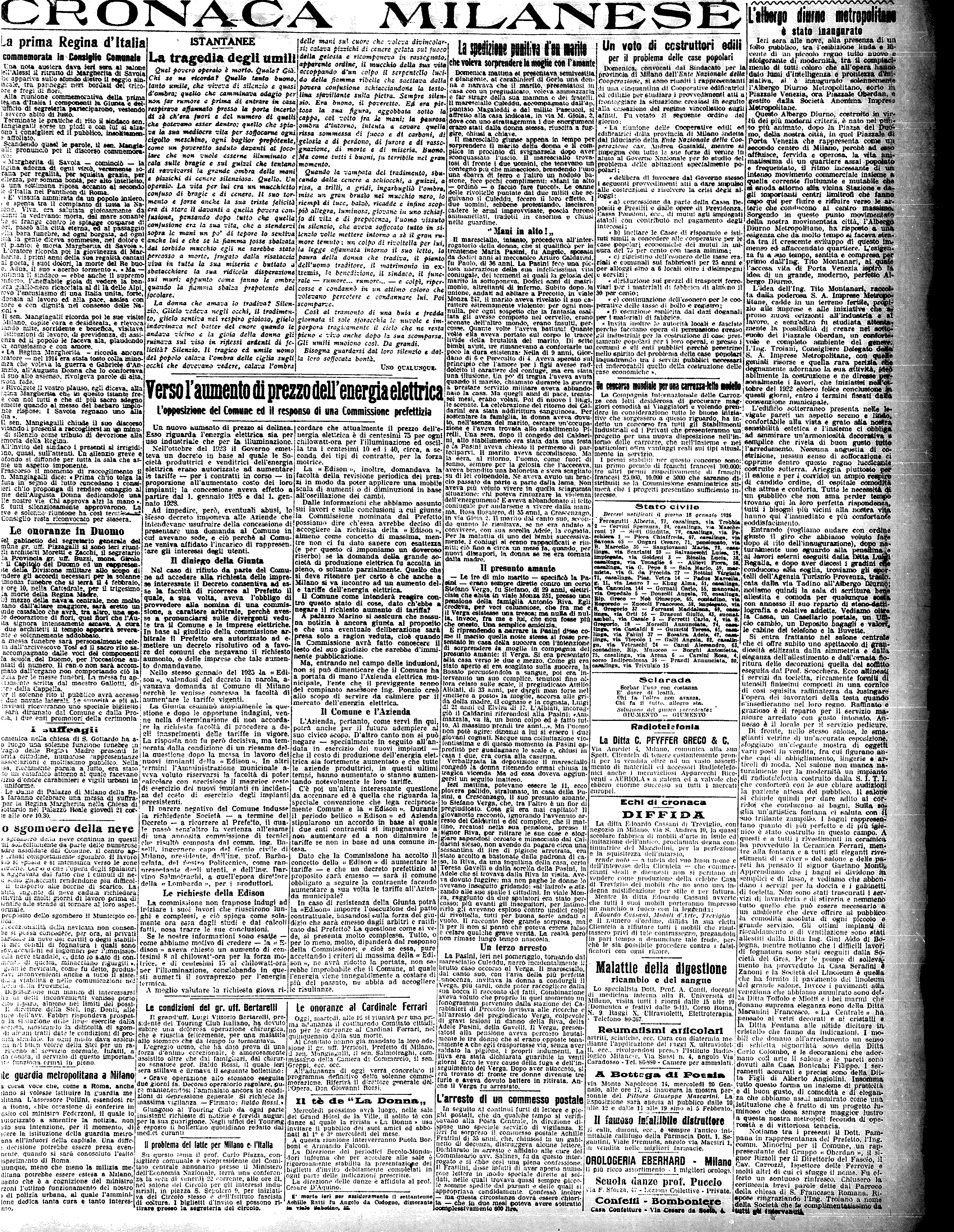
Article on the inauguration of the Diurno on the daily newspaper il Secolo of 19 January 1926 (first column from the right)

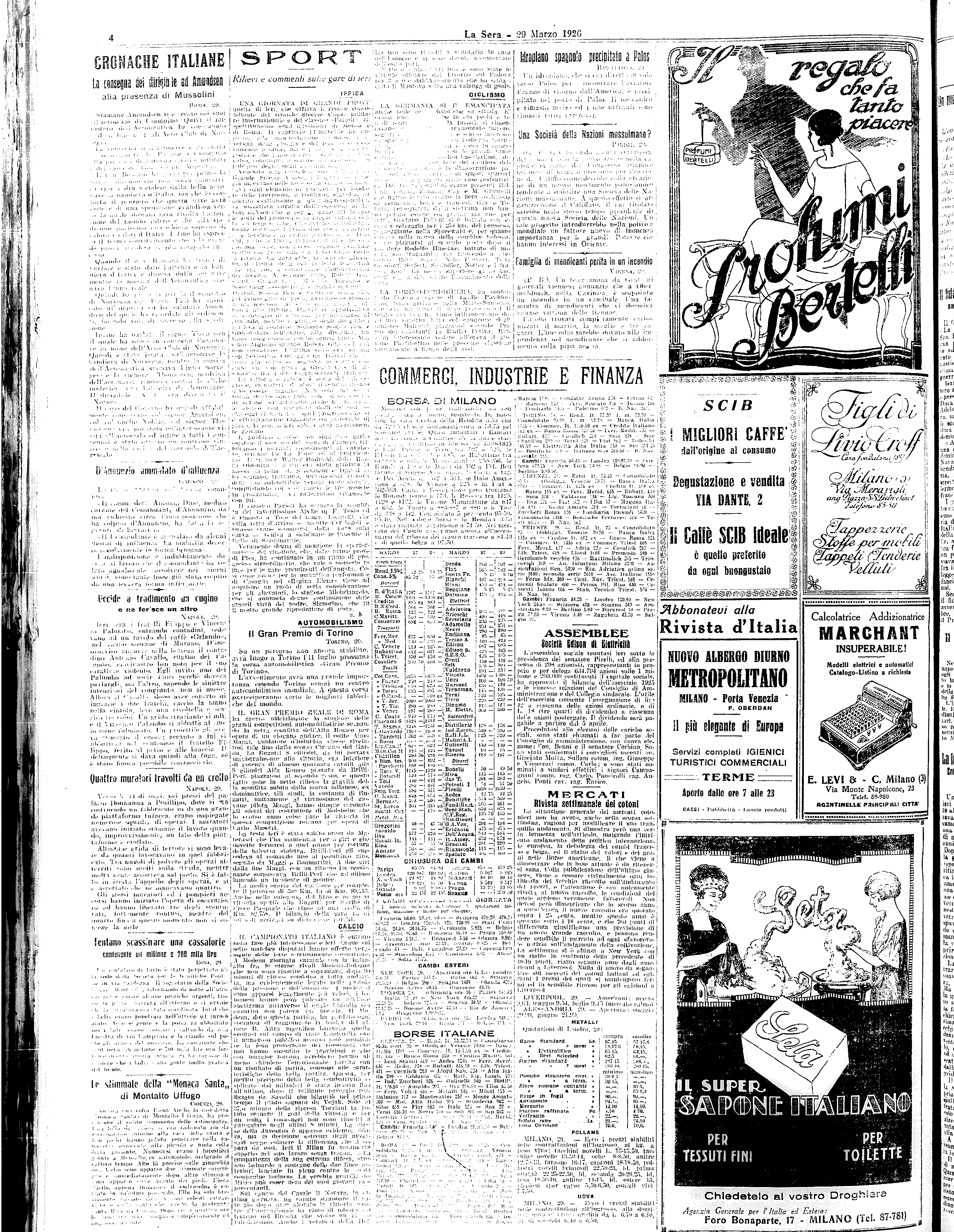
Advertisement of the Diurno on the daily newspaper la Sera of 29 March 1926 (second column from the right)

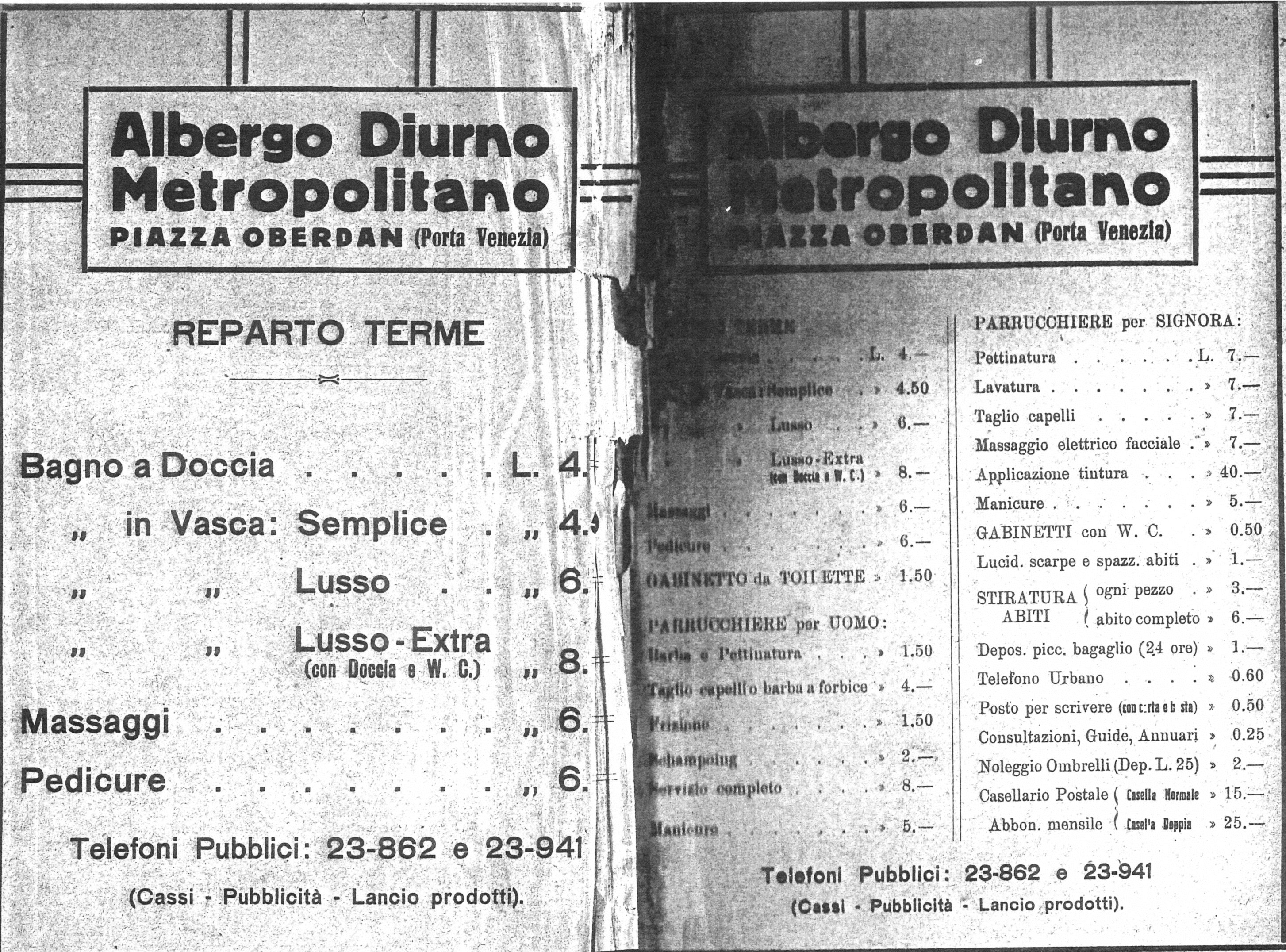
Price list of 1926 from the advertisement of the Diurno on the Guida Savallo

It was planned and built between 1923 and 1925 and opened on 18 January 1926. Its official name was Albergo Diurno Metropolitano and it was opened every day from 7 a.m. to 11 p.m.

The convention for the concession for thirty years of the square was signed on 24 November 1923 by the Milan municipal assessor to building, Cesare Chiodi, and the engineers Troiani, Cavacini and Masini, referring to a project of the engineer Troiani. The three engineers established the Società Anonima Imprese Metropolitane (S.A.I.M.) to manage the albergo diurno. A monument above it to Guglielmo Oberdan was planned but never built. The square, previously called Piazzale Venezia, was dedicated to Guglielmo Oberdan on 19 July 1923.

The decorations, the furniture and a part of the general architecture have been attributed to architect Piero Portaluppi.

The Albergo Diurno was approximately 88 meters long and 14 meters wide circa and occupied a surface of around 1200 sqm. It was divided in two parts, the public baths towards via Tadino and the hall of the artisans towards corso Buenos Aires. The public baths, with an access from the side of via Tadino, occupy two thirds of the length and have six luxury bathrooms with bath tub and the simple baths with shower with access from two parallel corridors.

In the main entrance area, heading towards the corso Buenos Aires, one could find a travel agency and a photographer, and the entry to the main hall with two side naves where there were barbers, manicurists and pedicurists. From the door at the end of the hall one could enter the baths section, with a central corridor ending with a bronze statue of Hygeia, goddess of health, made by the sculptor Luigi Fabris. The central corridor is connected to the two corridors of the baths, to the heating room and to a safety exit.

In the square two cement columns that contain the smoke chimneys can be seen. Over the access staircases there were two platform roofs but only the one towards via Tadino has been conserved, but without the covering glass. The platform roof towards the corso Buenos Aires was removed when the subway line 1 was built in the 1950s. Access to the Diurno was opened from the staircase to the subway. A part of the entrance hall and the toilets have been demolished.

In 1985 the baths were shut down. In 1990 the structure was given in concession to the Consorzio Oberdan Servizi, created by the artisans that worked there. Most of the artisans left the Diurno in the middle of 1990, selling a part of the furniture that they considered their own. The last barber for men, Carmine Aiello, was sent away by Milan on 16 June 2006, for legal reasons. Afterwards, following the break of a skylight by the wheel of a cleaning truck, the skylights were covered with asphalt outside and reinforced inside.

In 1995 the company GTS of Bergamo proposed to the Municipality to transform it into a beauty farm. The project was stopped by architect Italo Rota, who became in 1996 assessor to urban quality in the Giunta Formentini and planned its transformation in a shop, conserving the hall, as a part of a project of renewal of Piazza Oberdan and modification of the Porta Venezia station of the subway line 1.

The Regional Direction for the Beaux Arts of Lombardy has put the Diurno under restriction as a national monument on 25 October 2005. Milan province, starting from year 2000, asked for the Diurno for the municipality to link it to Spazio Oberdan and put offices and archives of the Cineteca Italiana. The project could have been financed by the earnings of the participation in the Autostrada Serenissima, tied to cultural uses.

On 3 February 2006 the municipal government approved the text of a 25-year agreement with the province, but the province never signed it because the money was used for the restoration of the spires of the Duomo di Milano. An attempt of the province to start in 2010 a Programma Integrato di Intervento with the Lombardy Region, the Ferrovie dello Stato Italiane and ATM was abandoned for lack of interest by the various institutions. The offices of Cineteca Italiana were later transferred to the ex Manifattura Tabacchi in viale Fulvio Testi.

The property of the structure has remained to Milan municipality which thought to restore it with its own funds, at least for the hall of the artists or as an alternative the emission of a bid to rent it to private organizations.

Following the publication of a study by Stefano Masi and Pierfrancesco Sacerdoti attributing to Portaluppi the project of the furniture, the Fondo Ambiente Italiano (FAI) and Fondazione Portaluppi have organized a convention on the Diurno at Villa Necchi for 4 February 2014.

Following this convention FAI, in agreement with the Municipality, opened the Diurno Saturday and Sunday 22 and 23 March 2014 from 10 to 17 as an initiative of the Giornate di Primavera of FAI, after FAI volunteers have cleaned and provided lightning to the Diurno.

In July 2015 FAI signed an agreement with Milan Municipality committing itself to plan and collect funds for a project of restoration and opening to the public of Diurno.

On 4 December 2015 the Municipality inaugurated the western side of piazza Oberdan over the Diurno, with the creation of a pedestrian area and the restoration of the columns and the platform roof under the monitoring of the Soprintendenza Belle Arti e Paesaggio di Milano .

FAI opens the Diurno once a month to the public with guided tours and events like modern art installations and theater plays. Booking is managed by FAI website.

== Pictures ==
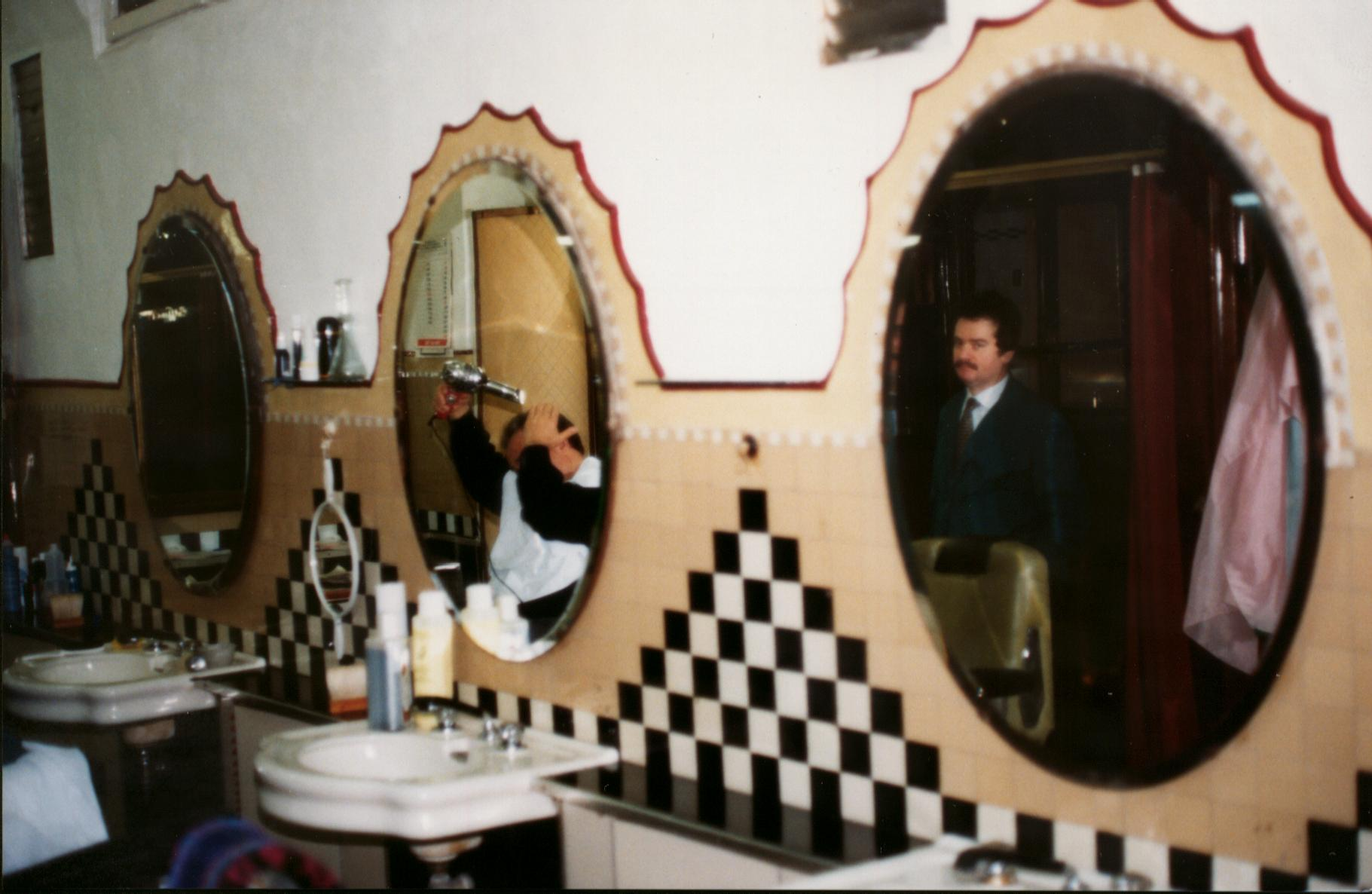
Barber shop in 1996

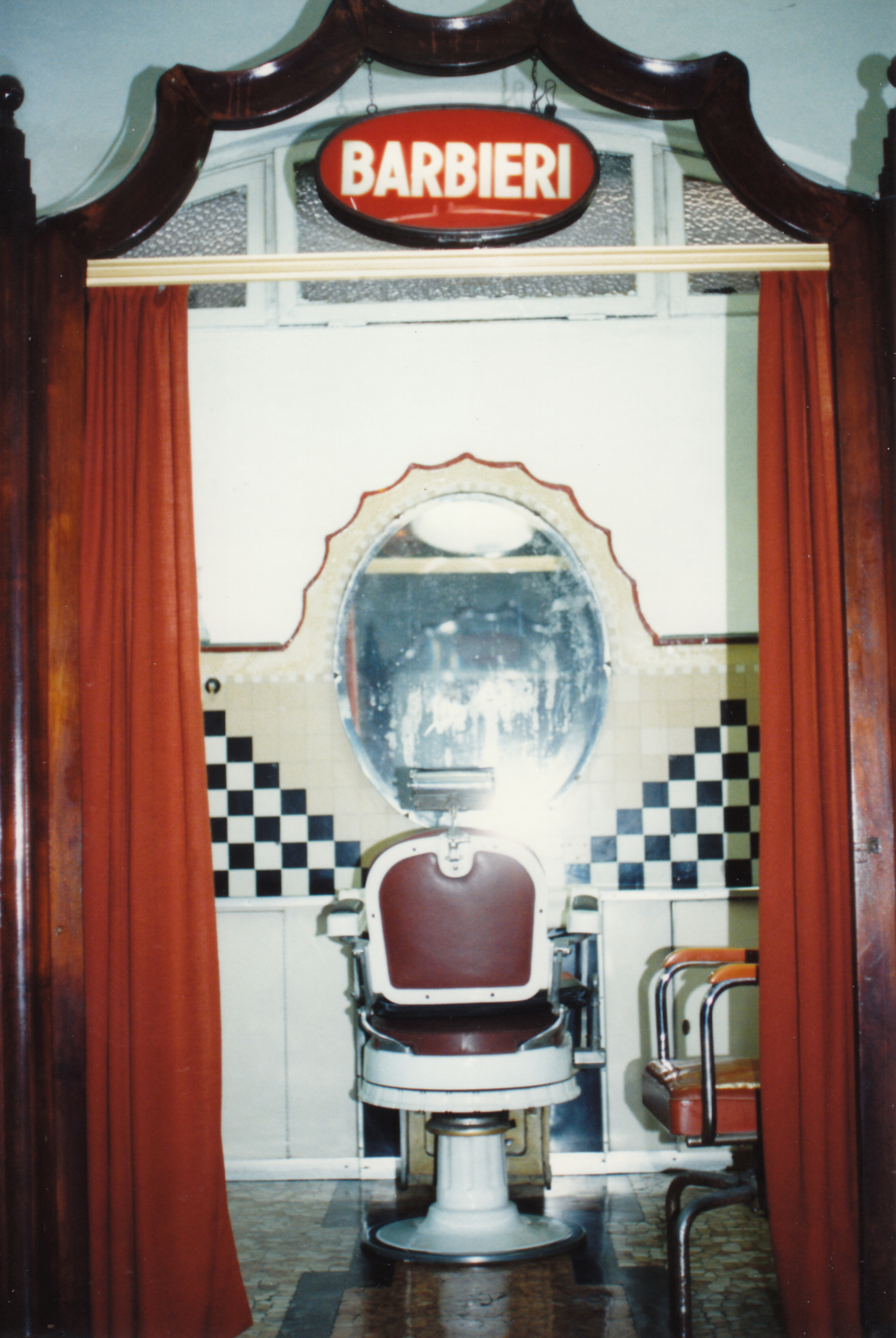
Barbers shop (1996)

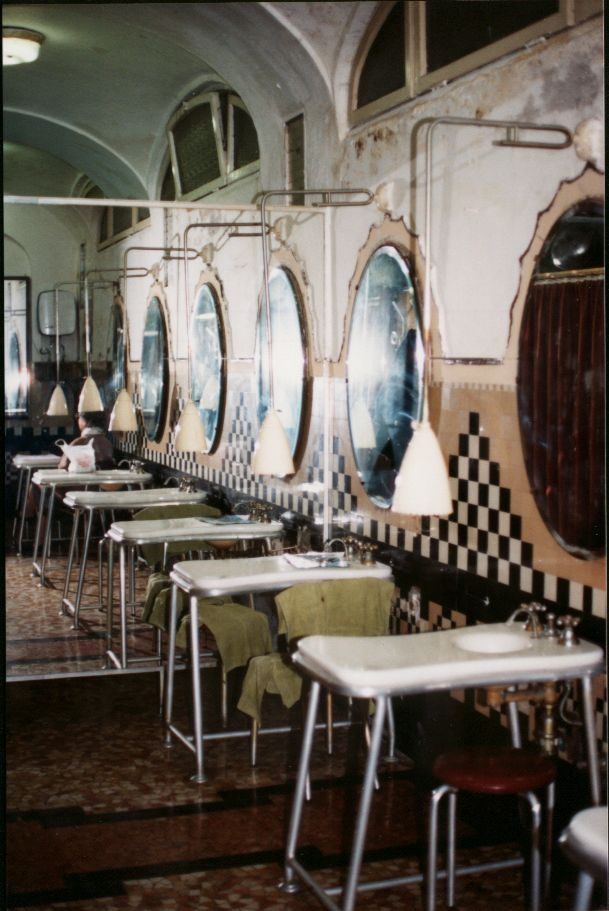
Manicure (1996)

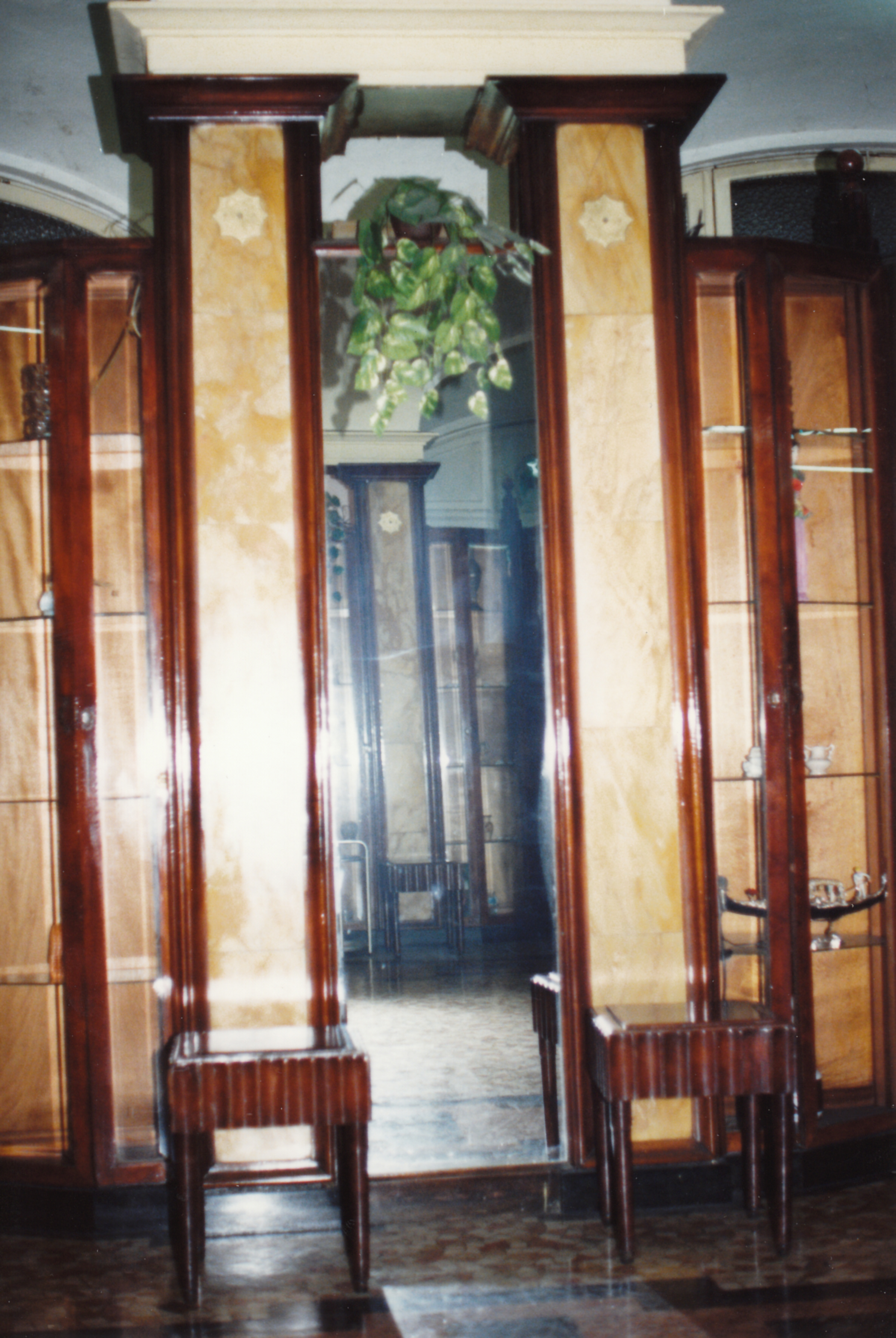
Boiserie (1996)

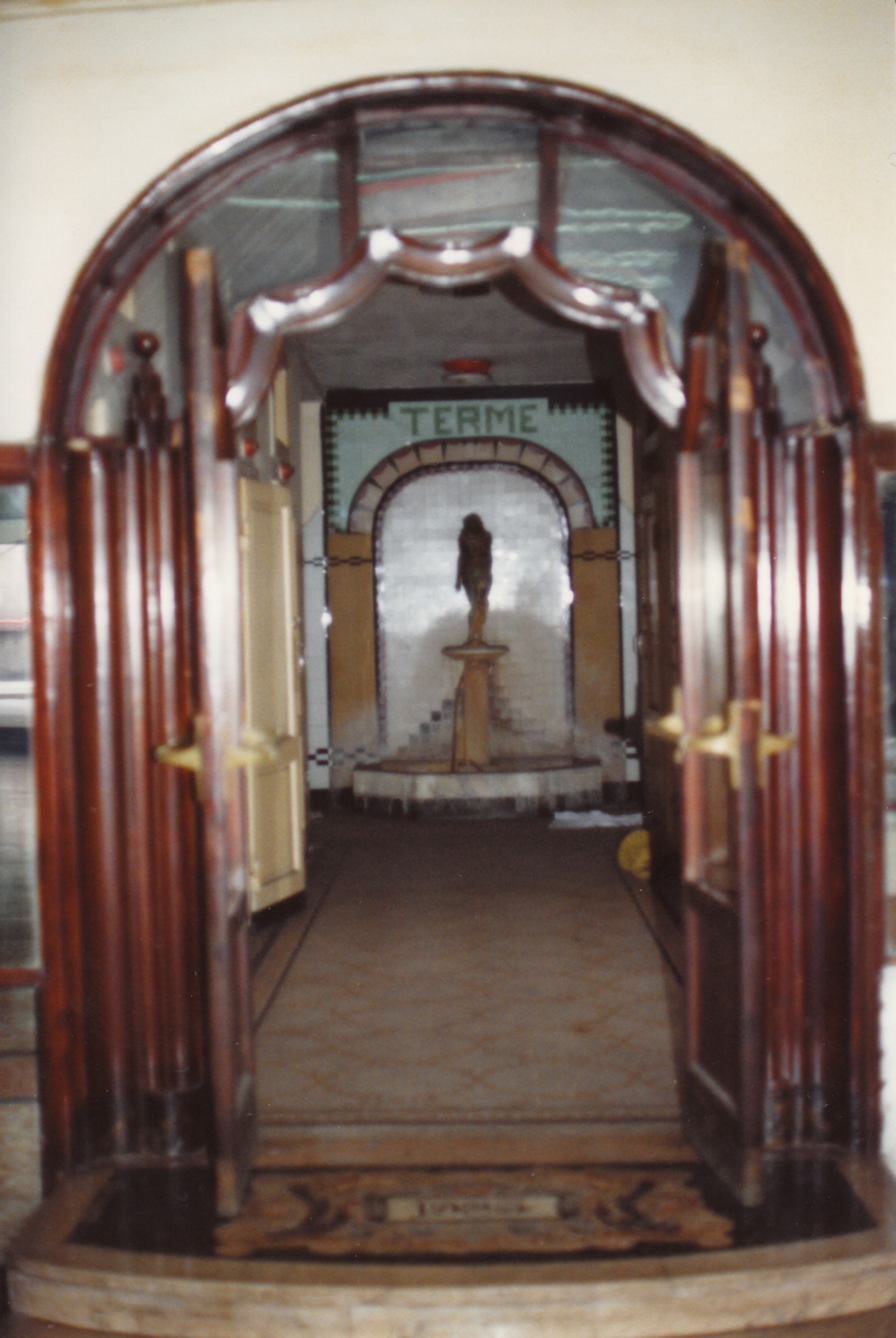
Statue of Goddess Hygeia of Luigi Fabris (1996)

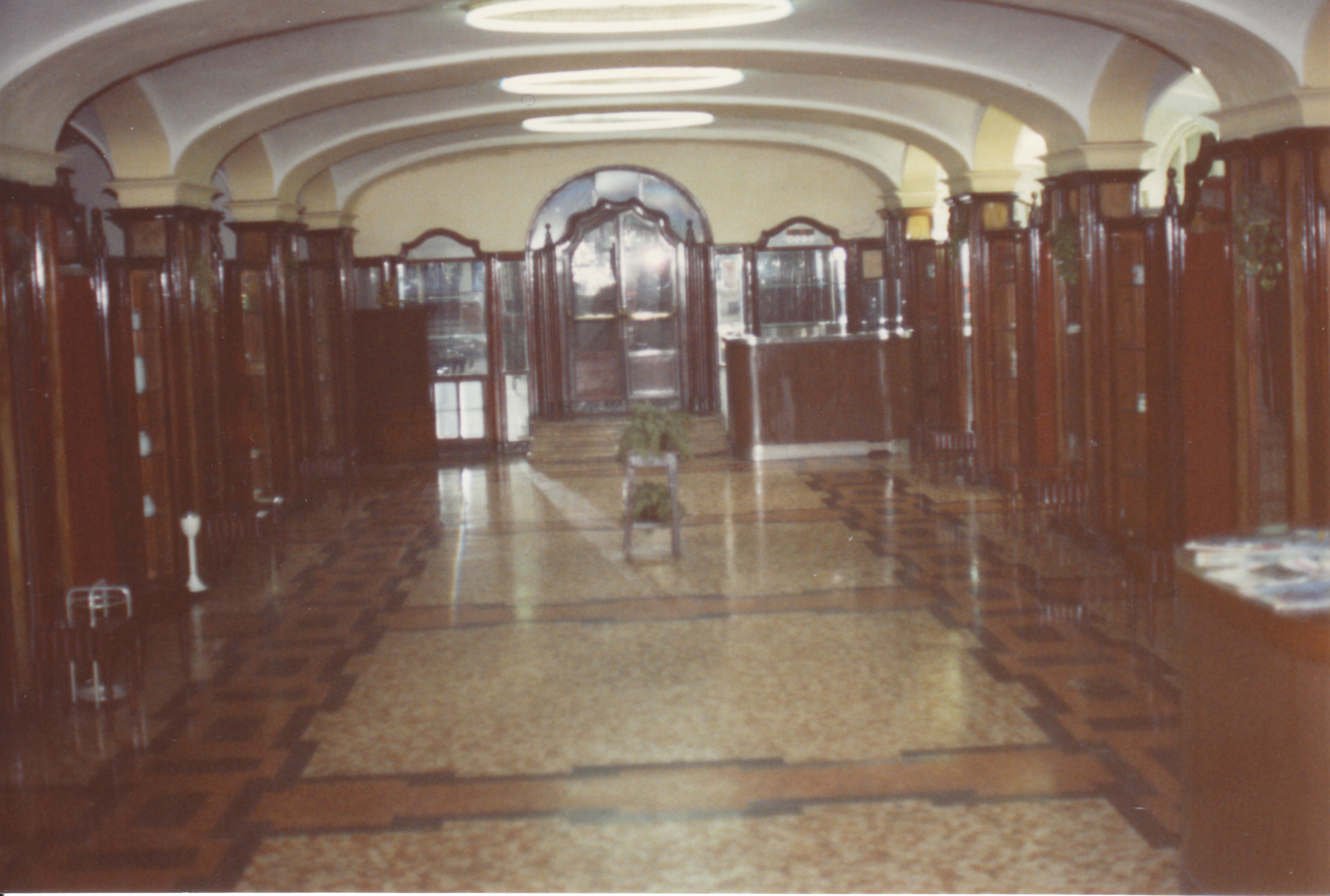
Hall towards the baths (1996)

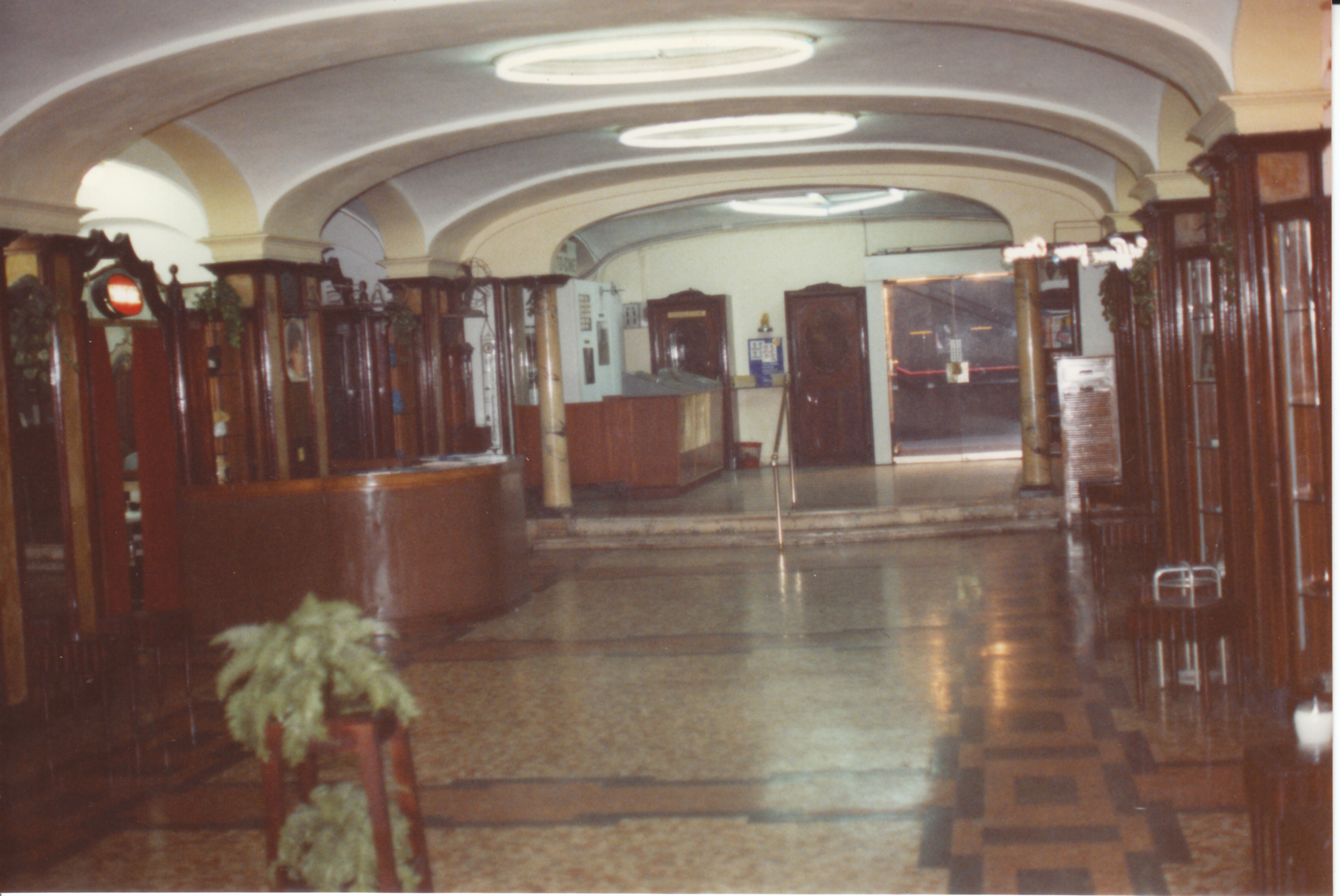
Hall towards the entrance (1996)

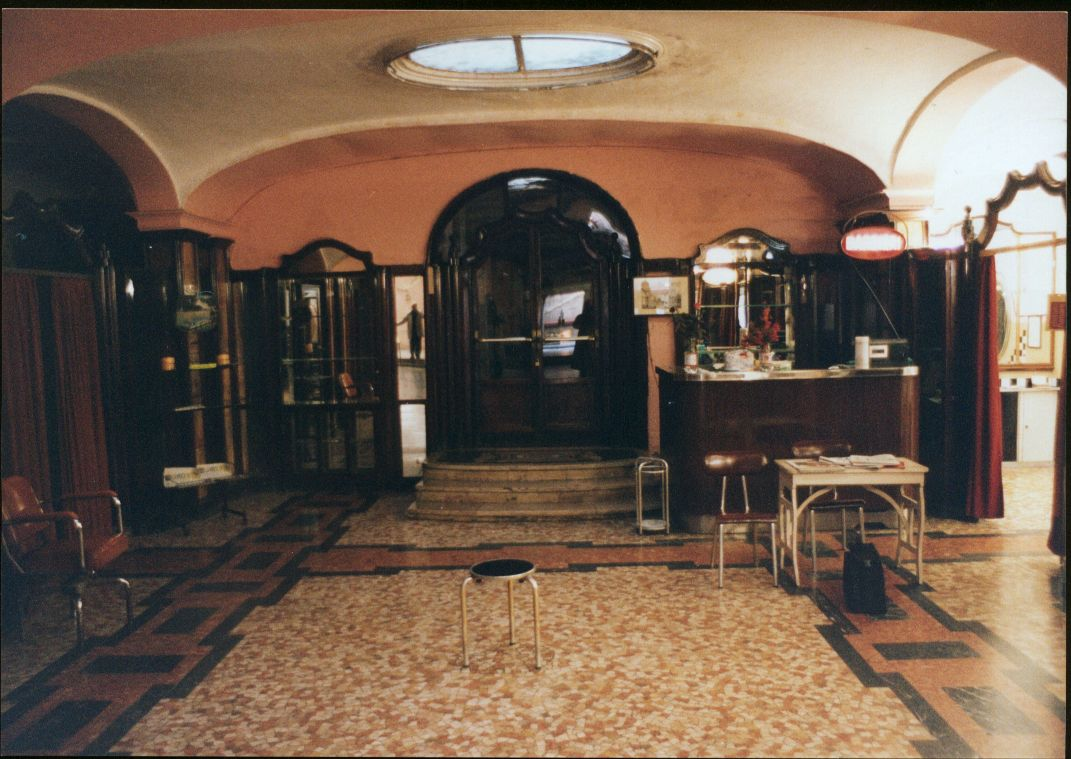
Hall towards the baths in 2003

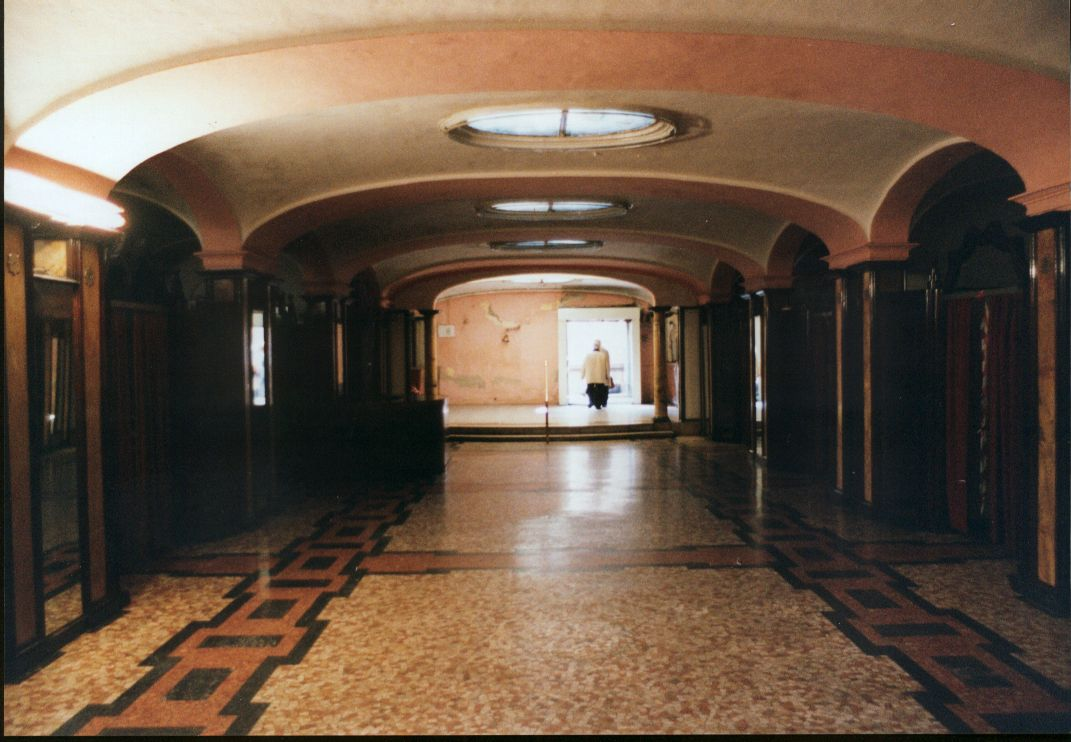
Hall towards the entrance (2003)

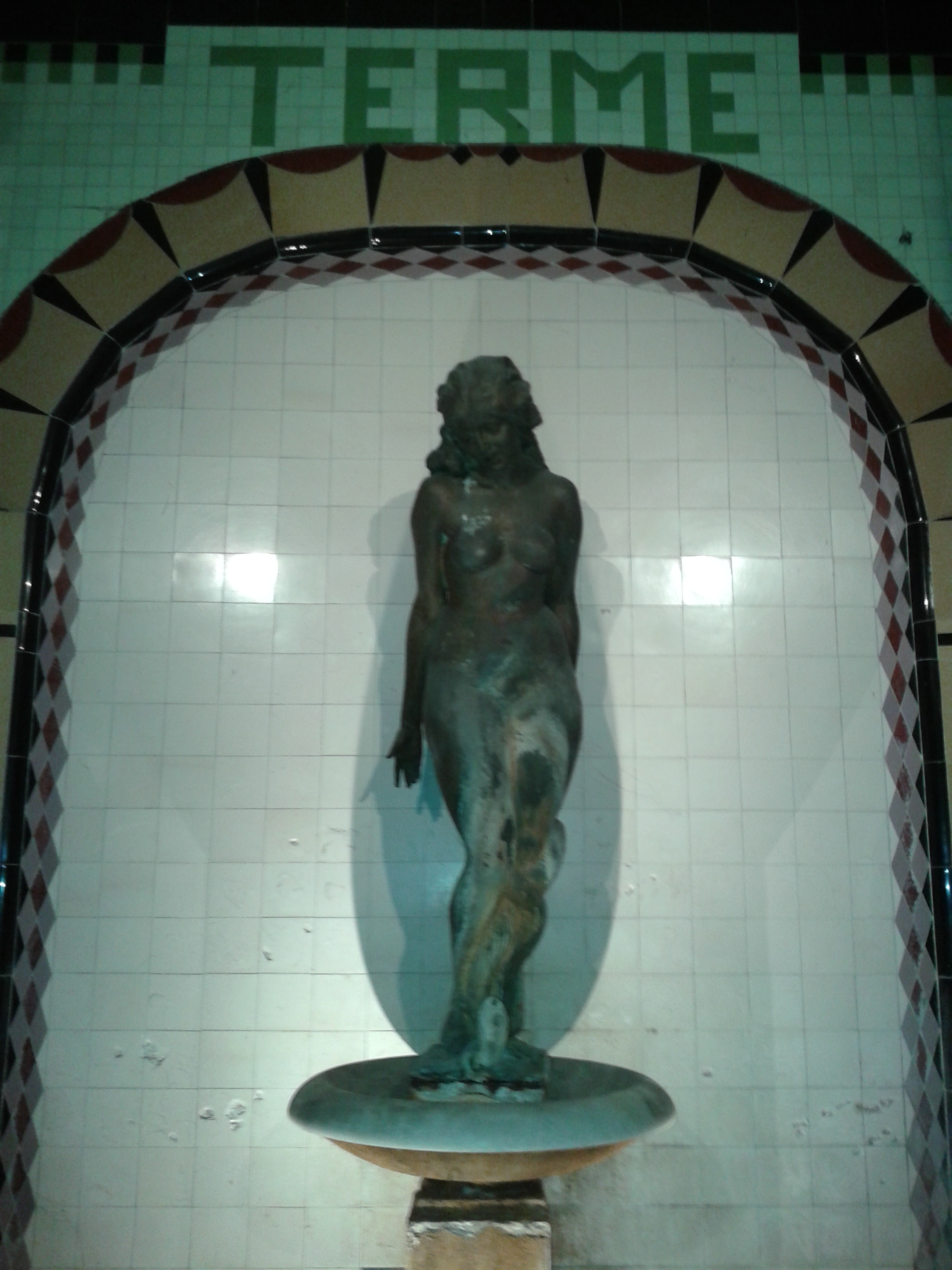
Goddess Hygeia (2014)

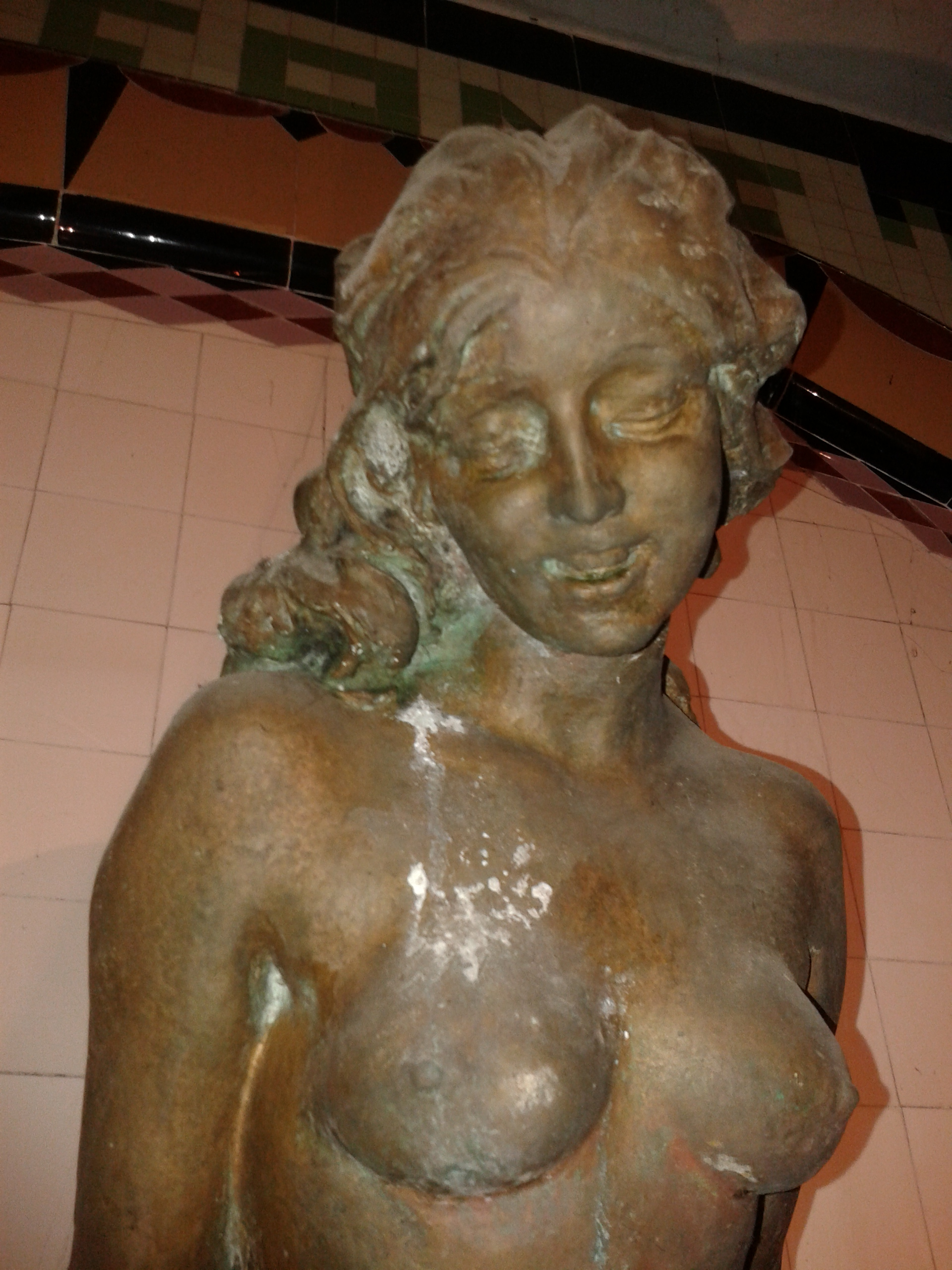
A detail of Goddess Hygeia (2014)

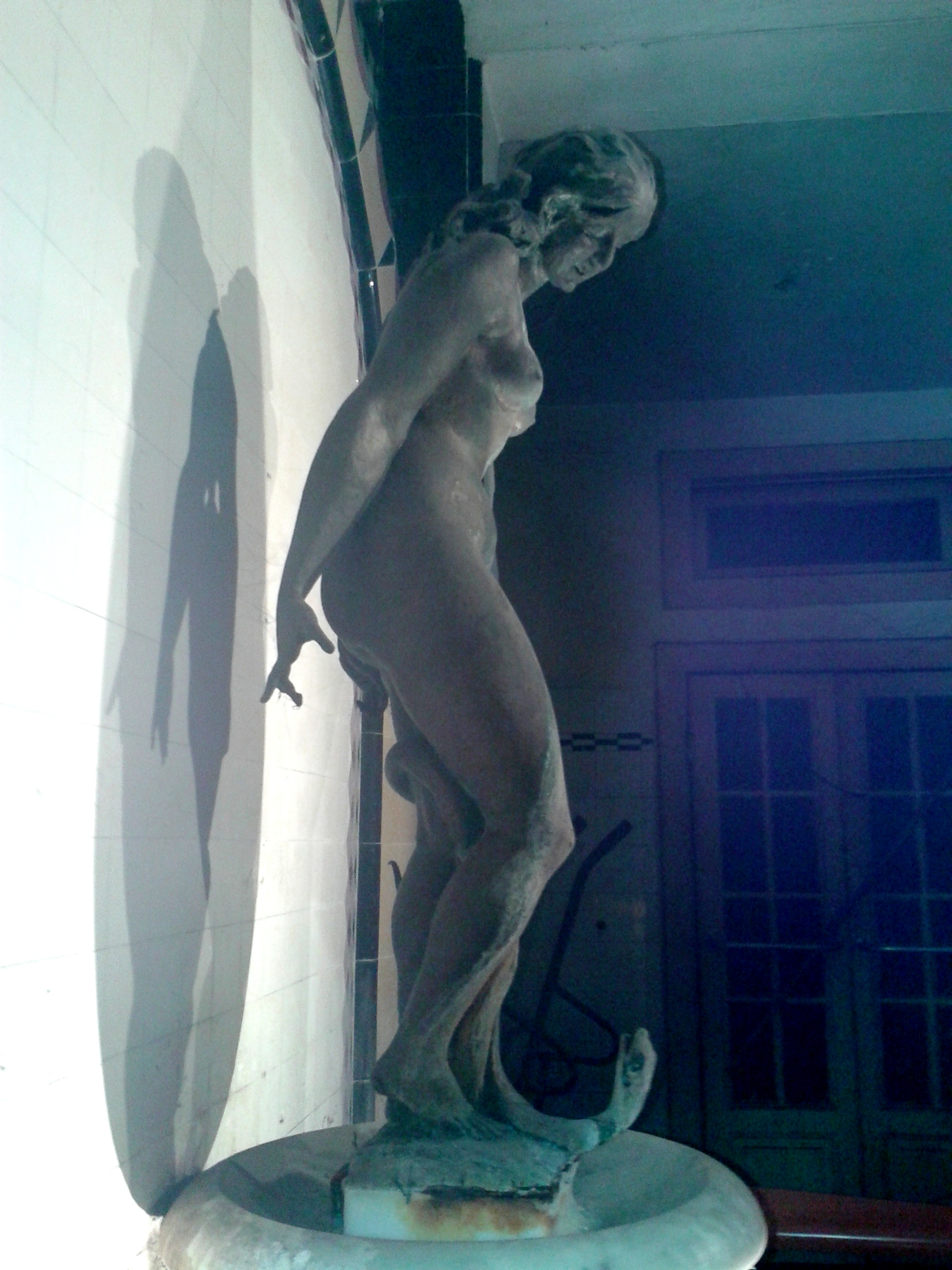
Goddess Hygeia (2014)

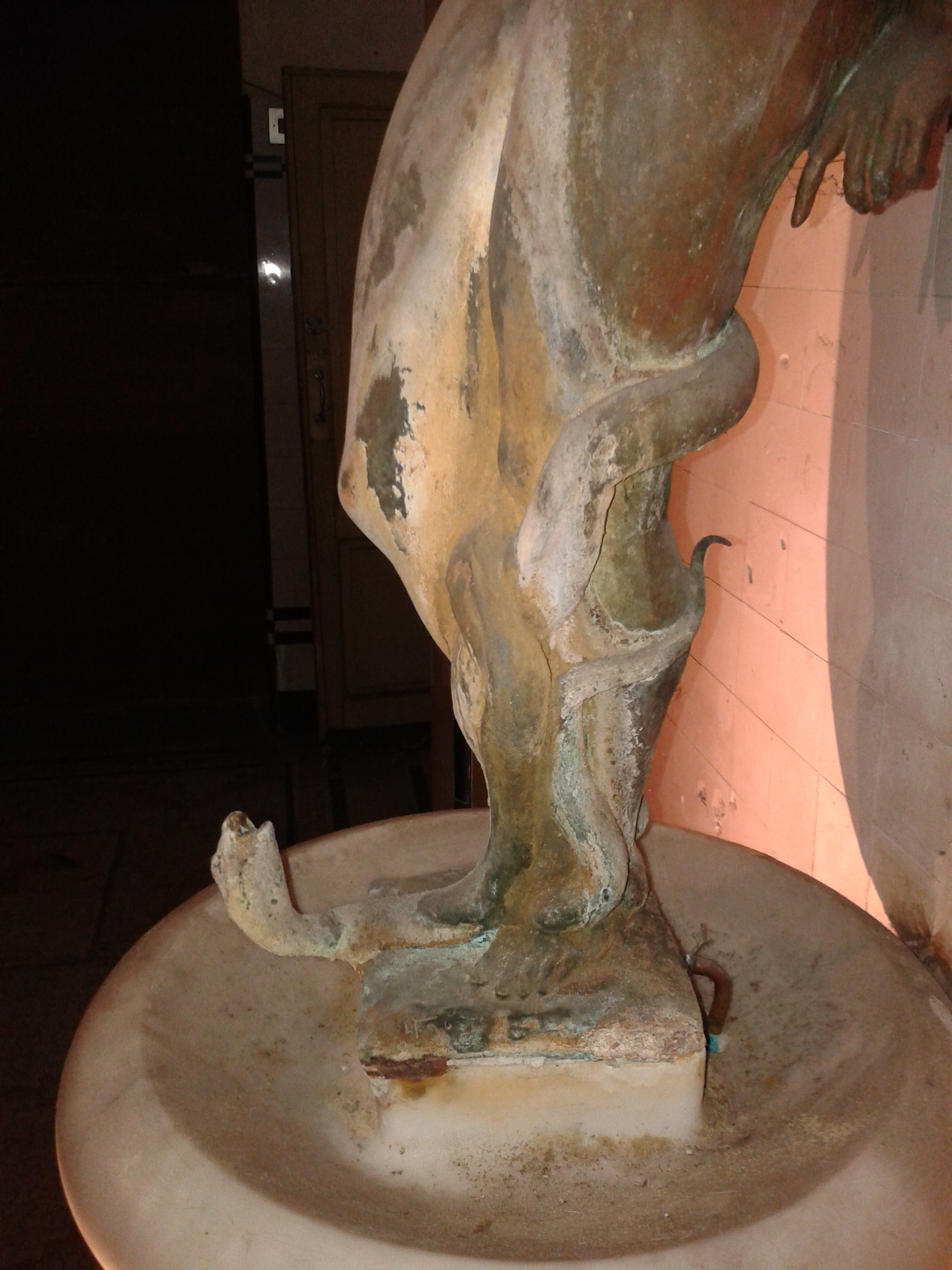
The snake of Goddess Hygeia seen from the right side (2014)

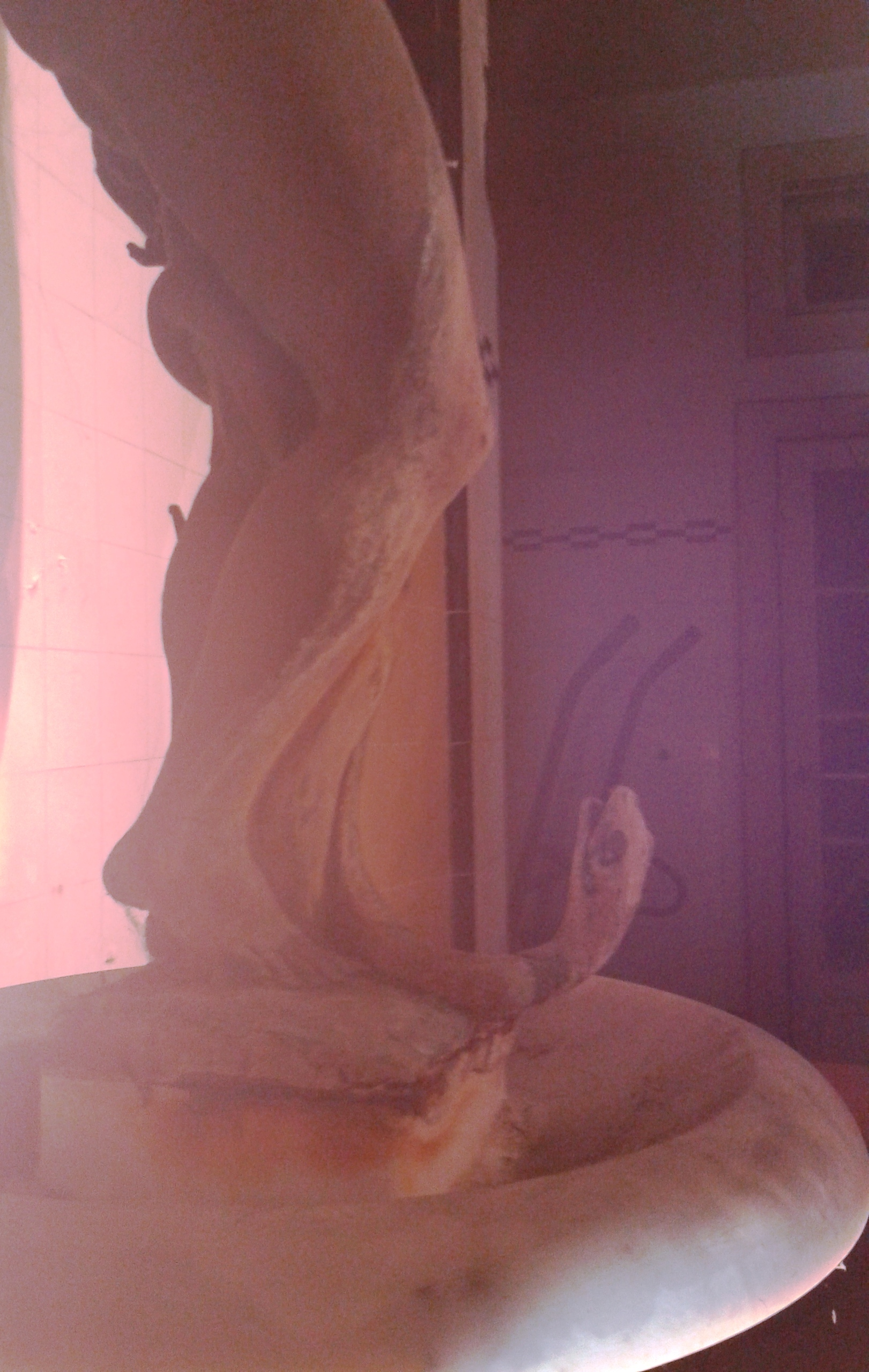
The snake of Goddess Hygeia seen from the left side (2014)

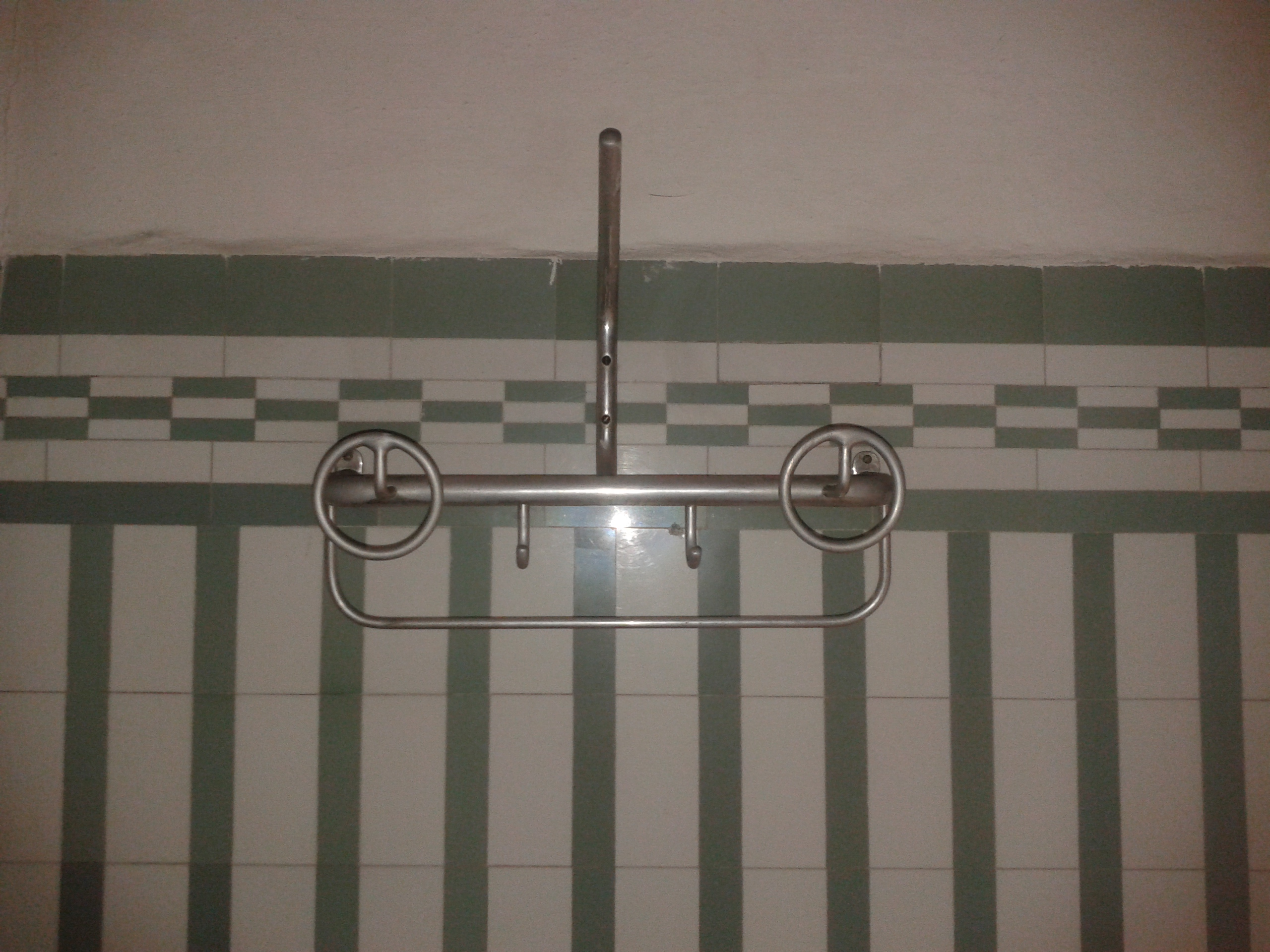
Clothes hangers in the bathroom (2014)

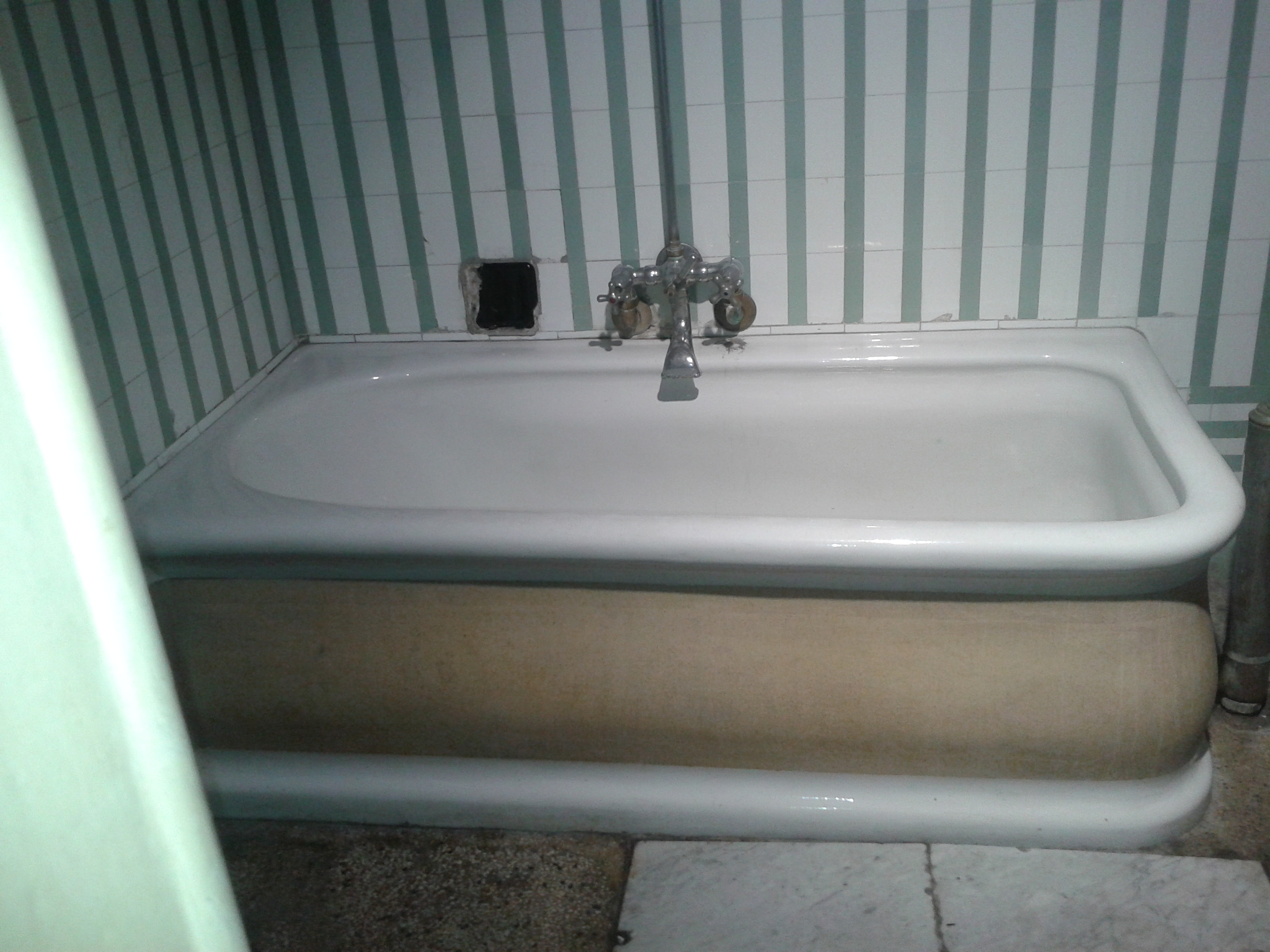
Luxury bath tub (2014)

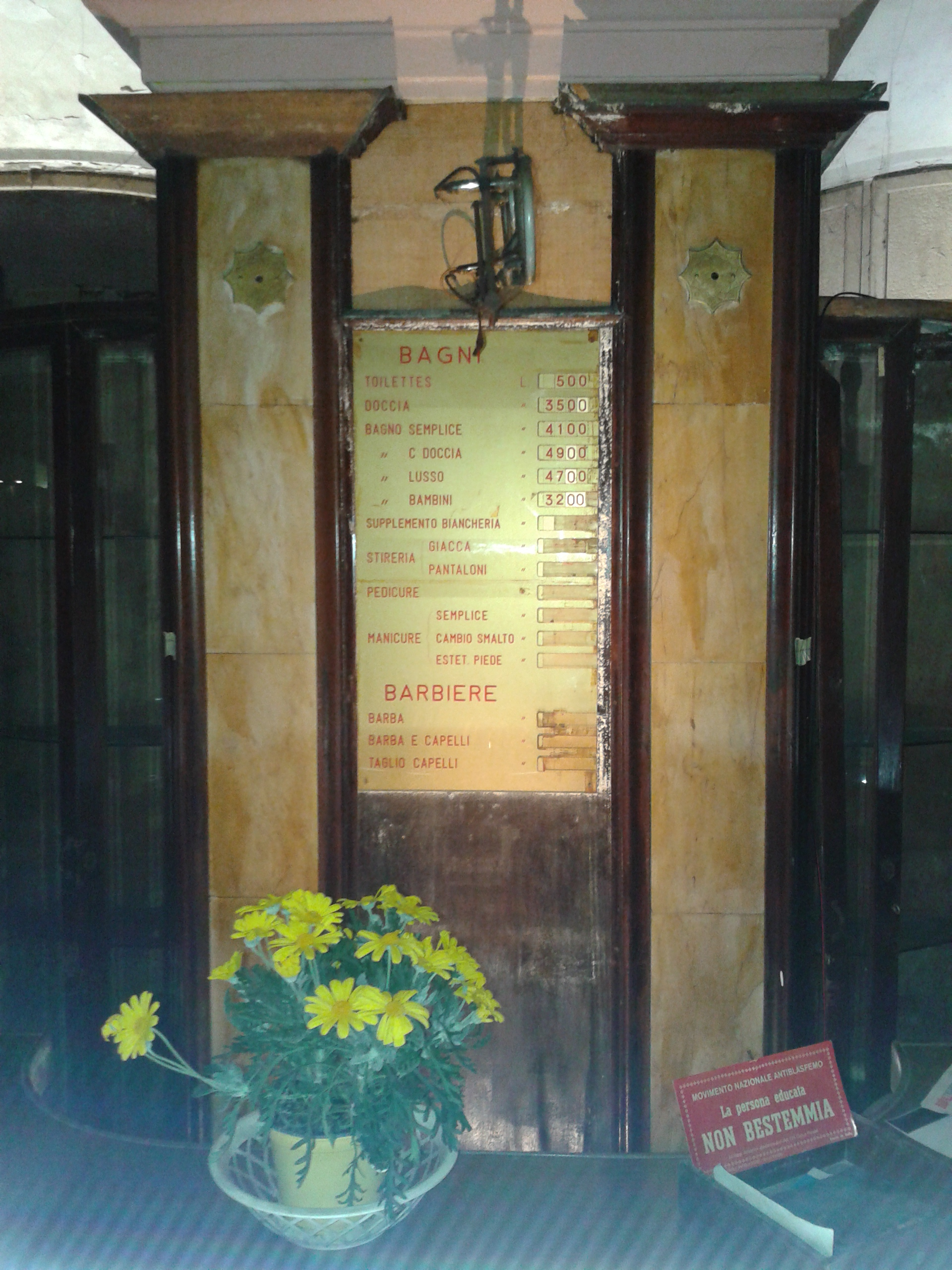
Table with prices (2014)

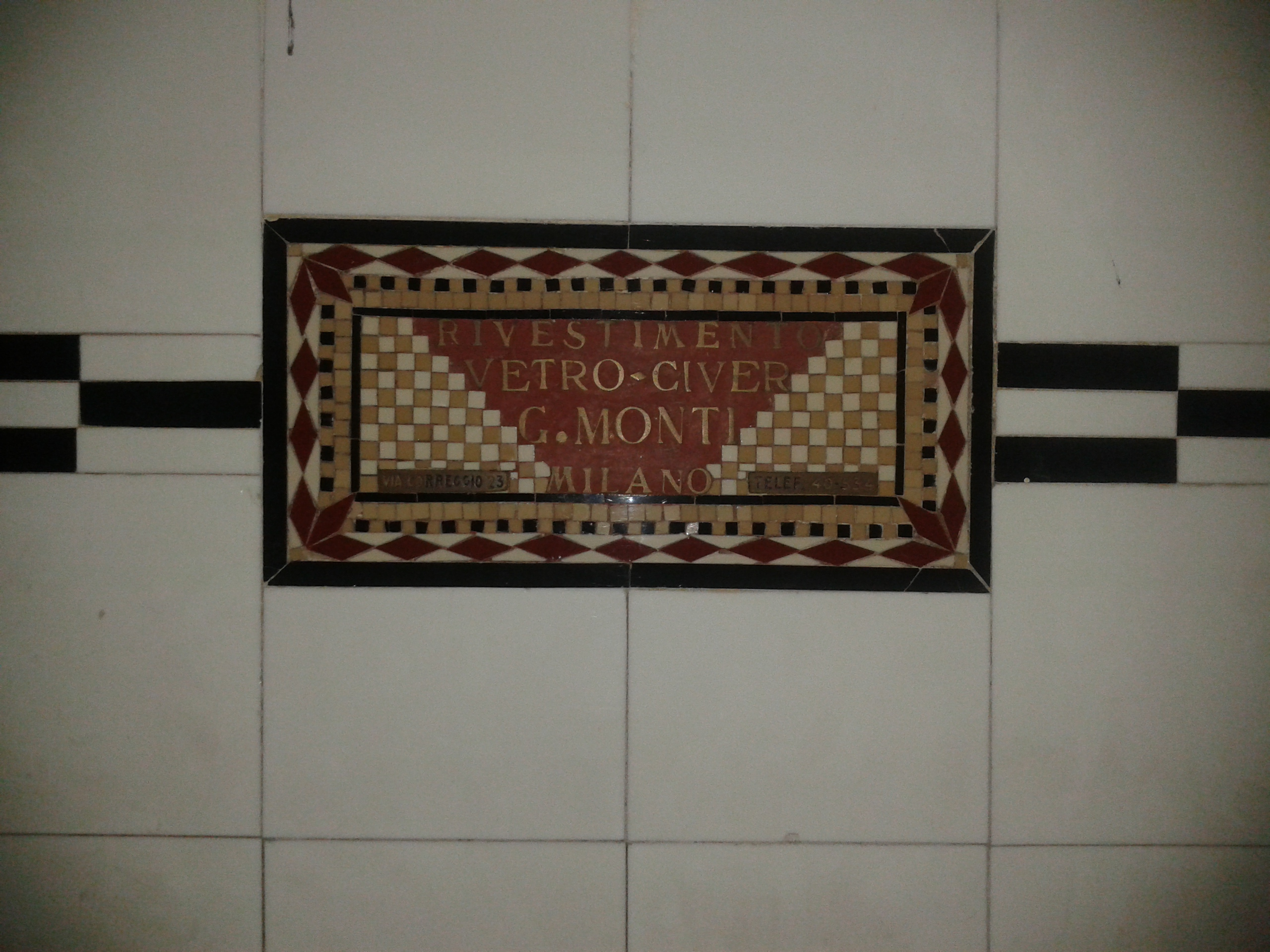
Plate of company Monti, producer of tiles in glass-civer (2014)

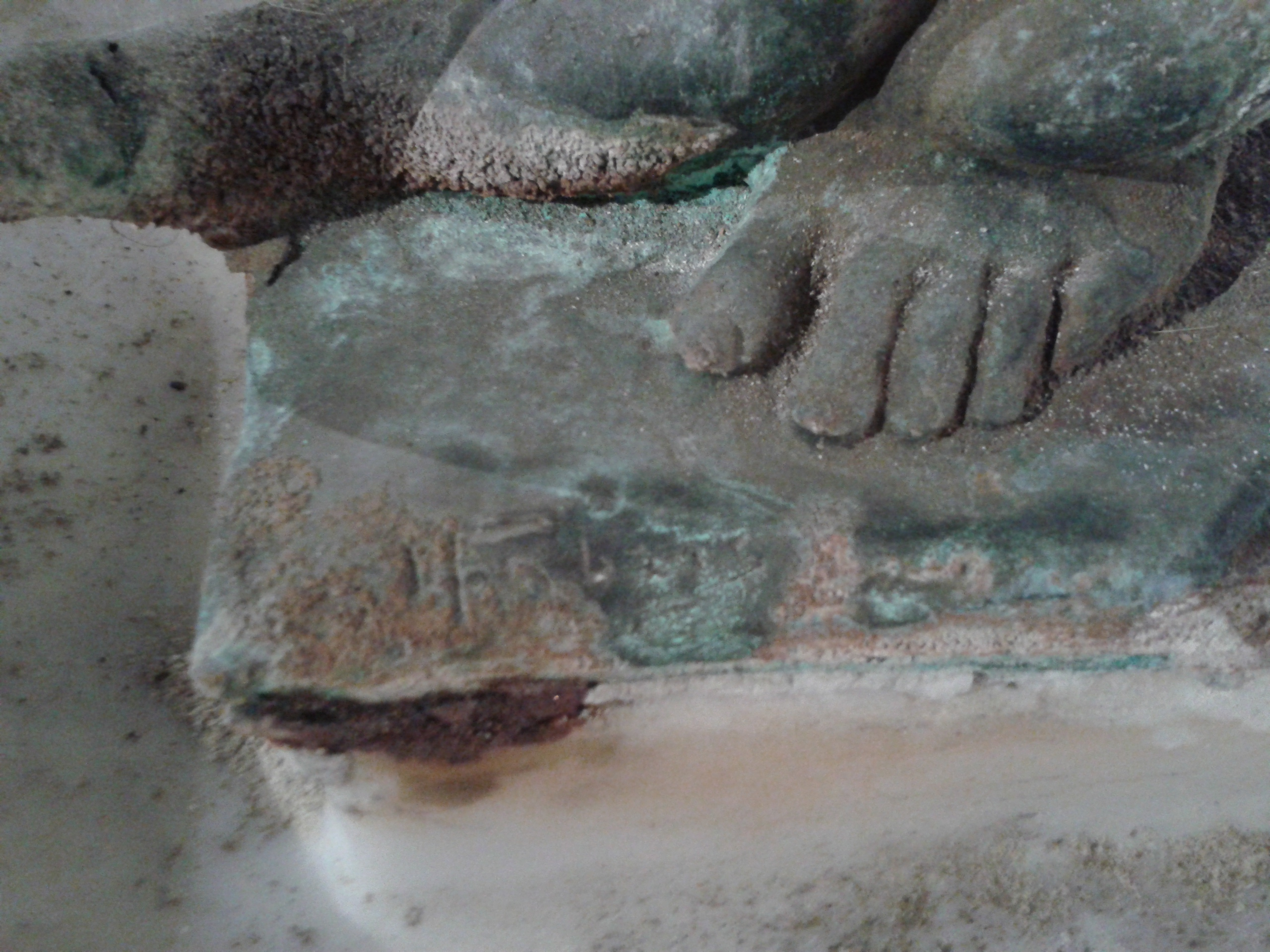
Signature of the sculpture Luigi Fabris under the statue of Goddess Hygeia (2014)

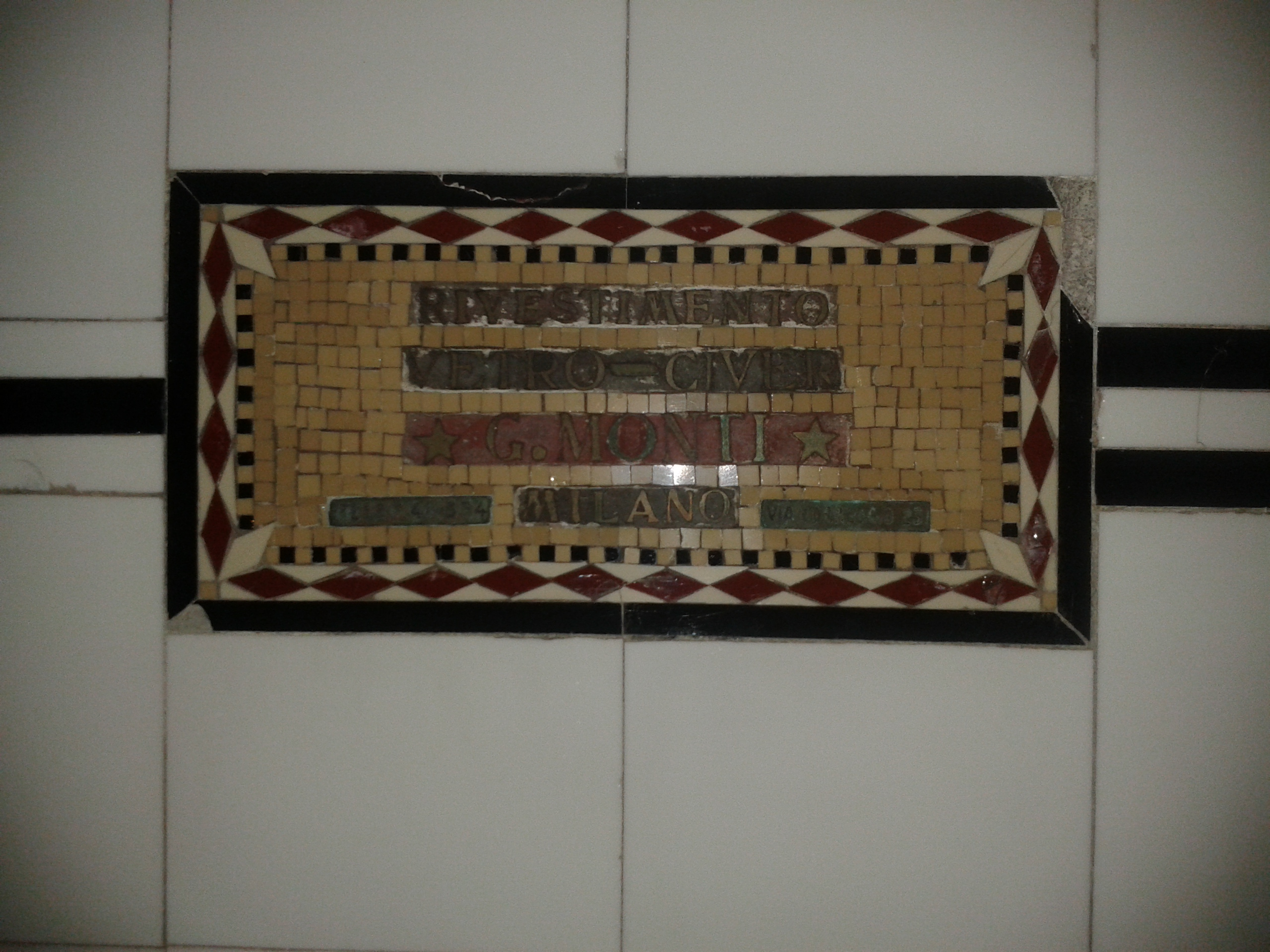
Plate of company Monti, producer of tiles in glass-civer (2014)

== Bibliography ==
- Stefano Masi, Pierfrancesco Sacerdoti, Il tempo sepolto. L'Albergo Diurno Metropolitano "Venezia" di Milano tra architettura e arti decorative. Proposte di recupero, in Un primo approccio all'arte e all'architettura liberty. Tra conoscenza e restauro, a cura di Cesare Renzo Romeo, L'Artistica Editrice, Savigliano, 2013
