= Manifattura Italiana Porcellane Artistiche Fabris =

The Manifattura Italiana Porcellane Artistiche Fabris was created by sculptor Luigi Fabris from Bassano del Grappa who, after acquiring Raffaele Passarin's pottery factory in Bassano, made the ceramic facade of Grand Hotel Ausonia & Hungaria at Lido di Venezia, which was finished in 1916.

After moving to Milan due to the First World War which had struck Bassano, Fabris, apart from making bronze statues, tried new methods to produce porcelain at 1300 degrees in the Magneti Marelli laboratories, which made ceramics for spark plugs. Once he obtained the desired results Fabris produced a large range of models just in a few years; some of these were large in size, which was unusual and risky for porcelain. The Manifattura, with offices in corso Indipendenza 7 in Milan, took part to the first Fiera Campionaria of Milan in 1923.

Important personalities of culture, theatre, cinema and politics, such as D’Annunzio, Petrolini and Baseggio, came to visit the laboratory. The Manifattura Fabris and Richard Ginori were the only porcelain factories published in the Enciclopedia delle Moderne Arti Decorative Italiane (1927), which included pictures of several pieces in the third volume devoted to the arts of fire.

The sample case, which reached a total of 530 models in 1942, is made up of romantic scenes, everyday life scenes, masks, caricatures, folk characters, musicians, dancers, historical personalities, characters of the Commedia dell'arte, allegorical and bucolic groups, sacred subjects, animals, and ornamental vases, all created by Fabris.

Tests were made on the use of heat resistant colors, besides common blue, and new decoration techniques were experimented.

In 1942 the laboratory was hit by allied bombing on Milan and destroyed by fire. Fabris moved back to Bassano del Grappa, where he had a new porcelain factory built in 1943 and worked until his death in 1952. His son Augusto carried on his father's activity until 1979, when he sold it to the Elite company, which also bought the right to reproduce the historical pieces.
