= Luigi Fabris =

Italian sculptor

Luigi Fabris (August 23, 1883 in Bassano del Grappa – May 19, 1952 in Bassano del Grappa) was an Italian sculptor and ceramist.

== Biography ==
Luigi Fabris was a sculptor from Bassano del Grappa. He studied at the Regio Istituto di Belle Arti of Venice between 1905 and 1906 under the guidance of Antonio Dal Zotto with whom he collaborated, in particular for the statue of Carlo Goldoni in Campo San Bartolommeo in Venice. Dal Zotto donated the model of the statue to his pupil's hometown as proof of his consideration for him. Fabris obtained the maximum note cum laude in "Nude Modeling" in the Second Special Course in Sculpture and received a cash prize as best student.

In 1912, after a period of teaching at the Artisan School and at the Professional Institute of Drawing, both in Ponte di Legno (Brescia), he returned to Bassano to teach at the School of Drawing. He took over the factory of Raffaele Passarin and made his first ceramic models, and designed and carried out the ceramic cladding of the facade of the Grand Hotel Ausonia & Hungaria at the Lido di Venezia between 1913 and 1916, recently carefully studied and restored.

As the expert in ceramics Nadir Stringa wrote in the introduction of the catalogue of the exhibition in Bassano del Grappa, Fabris "set out on a grandiose oeuvre in which he could express both his artistic gifts: sculpture (with large figures, plants, fruit and architectural elements in bas relief) and painting (the whole surface is painted with a rich palette of colours ‘a gran fuoco').

In 1916, after the damage caused by World War I in Bassano del Grappa (aerial bombing struck the bridge on the Brenta river near his kiln in Via Gamba), he decided to move to Milan in Via Bandello 15. In 1918, an architect friend of his, probably Giovanni Muzio, invited him to open an art studio in Via Lanzone, where he devoted himself to large bronze statues and to the production of pottery thanks to the help of a few workers from Bassano who had followed him.

After the end of World War I, when he was already an accomplished sculptor, he made the statue for the Monument to the Fallen Soldier of the Air Force Ferruccio Lucchetti at the Cimitero Monumentale di Milano.

In 1920, he was commissioned by the Municipality of Bassano to make the statue La Musa Scrivente dedicated to the writer Giovanni Vaccari, deceased in 1919, currently in the Parolini Gardens in Bassano. He won the first prize at a sculpture contest in Genoa with the work La Samaritana. The bronze statue is now in a building in Genoa, while the plaster statue is kept in his studio. In 1922, he sculpted a monument in high relief commissioned by the Venetian provinces for the Opera Bonomelli in Bergamo. He made the statue of the goddess Hygieia for the Albergo diurno Venezia in Milan at the entrance of the baths section, in the years 1924-1925.

In Milan he decided to try producing porcelain. The tests for the mixture of raw material and baking at high temperature were successful, thanks to the help of Raffaele Passarin's brother, who was an engineer in the laboratories of the Ercole Marelli company, founded in 1891 for the production of physics and electrical devices.

After he obtained the desired results in ovens at 1300 degrees, Luigi Fabris established a factory of art porcelain in Corso Indipendenza 7 in Milan, with many ovens for high temperature baking.

He designed the red anchor logo and a monogram to protect his work and produced a large range of models, in just a few years; some of these were also large in size, which was unusual and risky for porcelain. In 1923 the Manifattura Italiana Porcellane Artistiche Fabris Milano participated to the first Fiera Campionaria di Milano in 1923. Fabris's production was successful and the laboratory was visited by important personalities of culture, theatre, cinema and politics. Gabriele D'Annunzio commissioned some pieces for the Vittoriale degli Italiani, Other important customers were Ettore Petrolini and Cesare Baseggio.

The Manifattura Fabris and Richard Ginori were the only porcelain factories published in the Enciclopedia delle Moderne Arti Decorative Italiane (1927), which included pictures of several pieces in the third volume devoted to the arts of fire.

As Nadir Stringa wrote: "The fantasy and creativity of Fabris are unlimited, and the sample case is continuously growing with romantic scenes, everyday life scenes, masks, caricatures, folk characters, musicians, dancers, historical personalities, characters of the Commedia dell’Arte, allegoric and bucolic groups, sacred subjects, animals, and ornamental vases. There were 530 models in 1942. He continued to test new heat resistant colors, besides common blue. Green, water green, sage green, yellow, yellow ochre, turquoise, periwinkle blue, lilac, rose, peach rose and new decoration techniques, such as the use of lace for ballerinas and small ladies, and small flowers and other relief decoration on the fabric of clothes, imitating the ancient Chinese ‘an hua’ (secret decoration) technique".

As other artists of the time (Arturo Martini, Bortolo Sacchi, Guido Cacciapuoti) Fabris believed in the artist's multiple, a limited series of small sculptures made by the artist with the collaboration of an artisanal laboratory. Thanks to his character he managed to surround himself with valid associates who kept the quality of production high: moulders, retouchers, flower designers, lace makers, painters, and gilders. He took part to the 1929 Leipzig Fair, where he obtained international fame. .

In the 1920s, he was elected head of the Ceramics Community of Lombardy and became a member of the Fascist Experimental Institute for Ceramics. Fabris porcelain was exported all over the world. He made a porcelain portrait of Princess Marie José of Belgium on the occasion of her marriage to Umberto II of Savoy. In 1935, he made a sketch of Benito Mussolini on horseback for an equestrian monument that was to be placed in Piazza Venezia in Rome, but the monument was censured because it ‘trampled’ on the ruins of Rome.

In 1940, he made a bronze Madonna statue for the Gaviraghi family tomb in the Cimitero Monumentale in Milan. In 1942, English bombs struck the Fabris factory but the print house was saved. Luigi Fabris returned to Bassano del Grappa with his family. In 1943 the print house for porcelain was moved to Bassano into the new headquarters in Via Torino 10, and the workers also moved from Milan. Luigi Fabris never stopped creating new models, helped by his sons Antonio (who was responsible for management), Gianantonio (responsible for sculpture) and his daughter-in-law Vittoria (responsible for painting).

After his death on 19 May 1953, Fabris porcelain was requested more and more. His work is on display at the National Museum of Cuba, at the Ceramics Museum in Bassano del Grappa, at the Vittoriale degli Italiani, and at the Museo delle Maschere in Rome. The critics of his time defined him as "an artist who works and keeps quiet" (Parenti 1927) and as "a poet, because he has managed to transfuse the poetry and passion that animate him into the cold features of his creatures" (Della Chiesa, 1928). Gabriele d’Annunzio called him "excellent creator".

== Works ==
The complete list of his works is included in the book Luigi Fabris 1883/1952. Plasmare l’Armonia, Sculture, Dipinti, Porcellane, with texts by Mario Guderzo and Nadir Stringa, Catalogue of the exhibition held in Bassano del Grappa, Comune di Bassano del Grappa, 2006.

=== Main Monuments ===
- Monument to Giovanni Vaccari, 1920, Bronze, cm 80 x 70 x 70, Bassano del Grappa, Giardini Parolini.
- Monument to the Fallen Soldier of the Air Force Emilio Ferruccio Lucchetti, 1922, Bronze, cm 180 x 85 x 40, cappella Lucchetti, cemetery of Camisano (Cremona). Kept in Milan until 2003, Cimitero Monumentale di Milano, rip. 16, n. 82.
- Goddess Hygeia, ca. 1924-1925, Bronze, Milan, Albergo diurno Venezia, Piazza Oberdan.
- Madonna for the Gaviraghi family tomb, 1940, Bronze, Milan, Cimitero Monumentale, rip. 14, n. 196-198.
- Monument for the Opera Bonomelli, 1922, Bronze, cm 135 x 210.

=== Porcelain ===
Fabris designed and produced 24 Biscuit porcelain sculptures and about a hundred polychrome porcelain sculptures. The detailed list is included in the cited catalogue of the exhibition. The most important are:

- Vittoria Alata, Frate Incappucciato (called Crisalide by the artist), Cavallo Greco, Libro Farfalla, L’ultima Suonata, Nudino con Maschera, Portacenere con Nudo, Nudo di Donna con Lampada, Busto di Eleonora Duse, Elefanti ed animali feroci. They were commissioned by Gabriele D'Annunzio for his villa at Gardone Riviera, on Lake Garda, in 1926. The villa was later renamed Vittoriale degli Italiani and donated to the State in 1930.
- Maria José. Model made in 1930 on the occasion of the marriage of the Belgian princess to Umberto II of Savoy.
- Ceramic cladding of the facade of the Grand Hotel Ausonia & Hungaria at the Lido di Venezia.

== Gallery ==
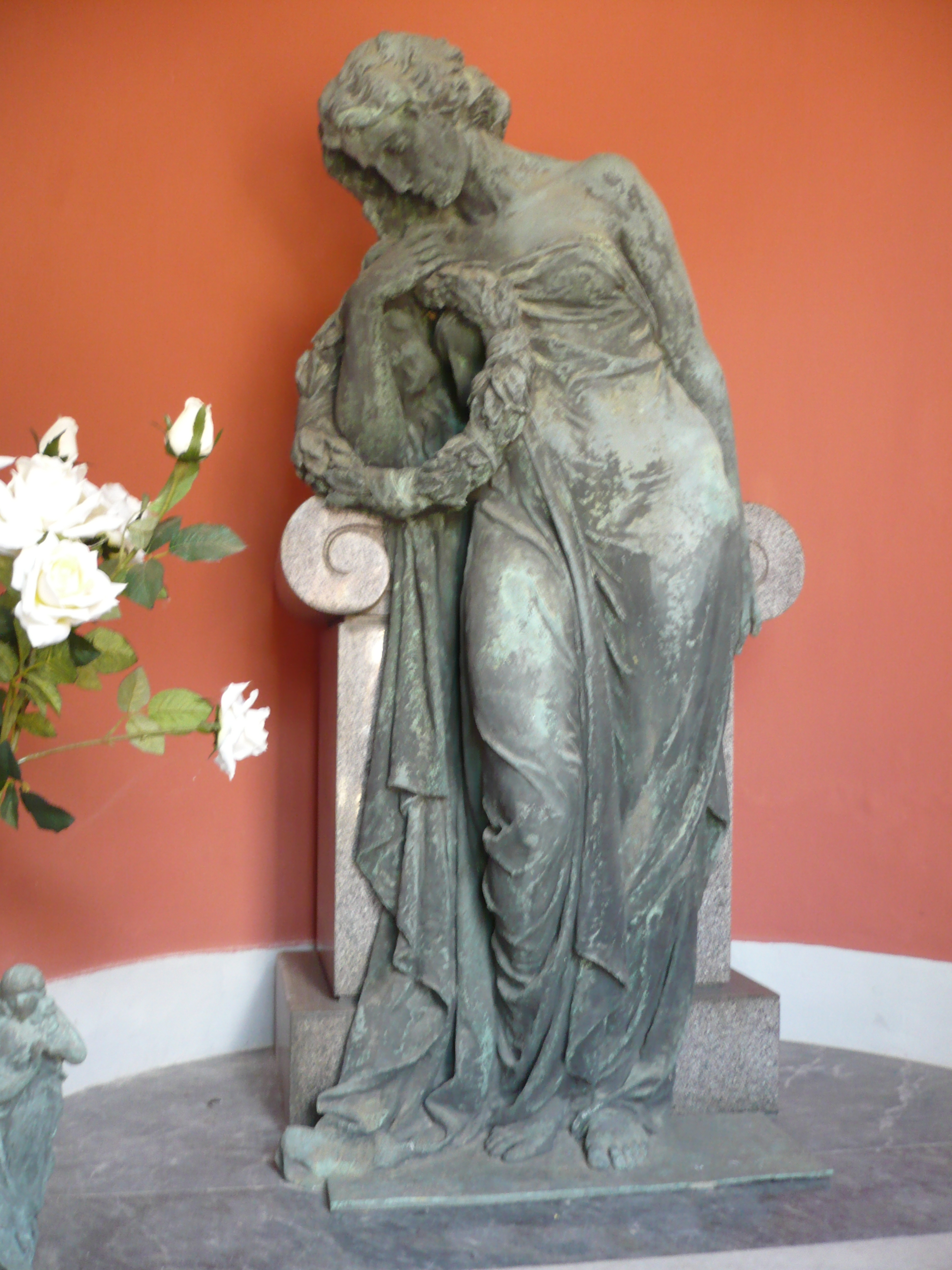
Monument to the fallen Soldier of the Air Force Emilio Ferruccio Lucchetti, Lucchetti chapel, cemetery of Camisano (Cremona), 1922.

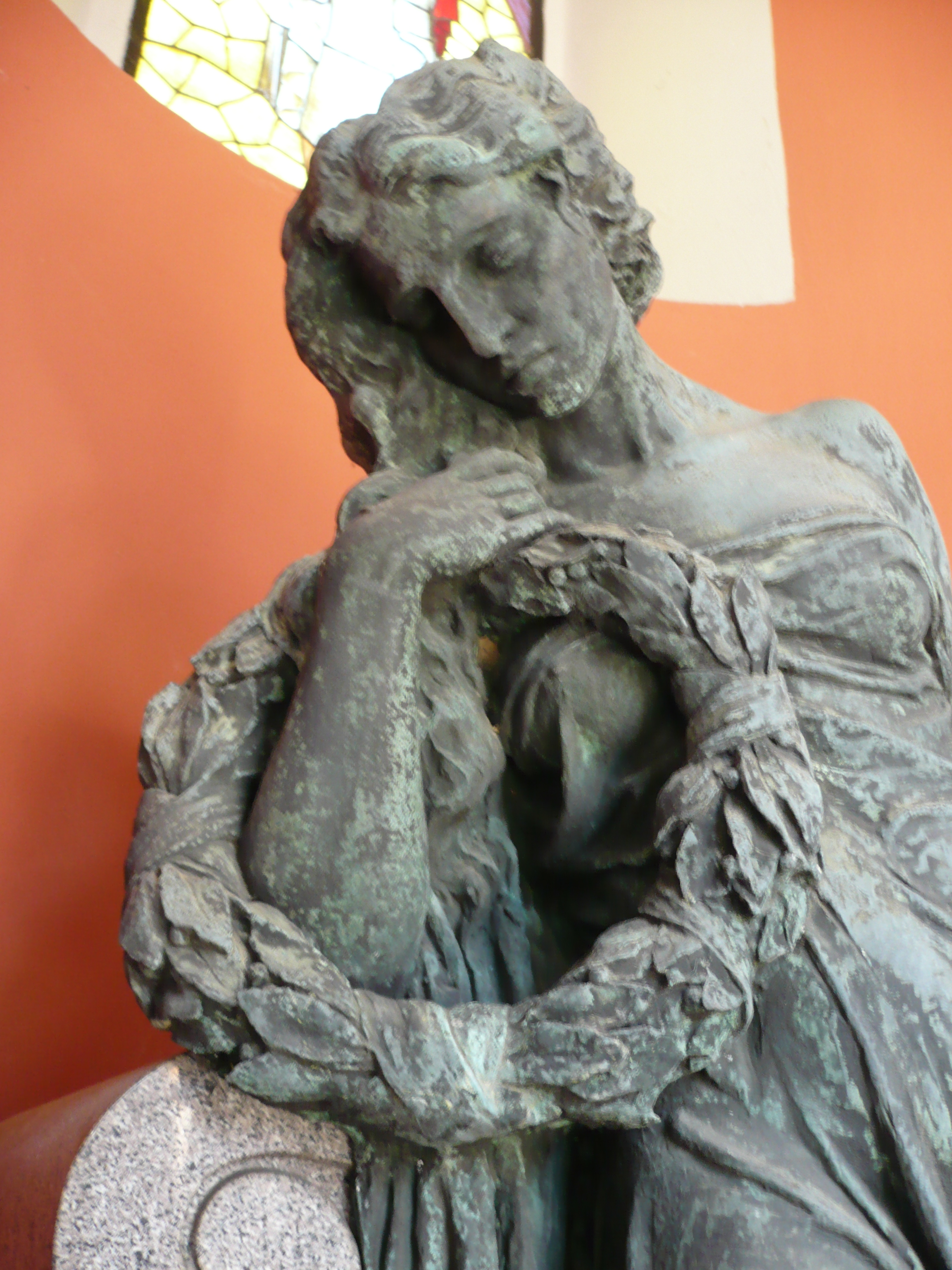
Monument to the fallen Soldier of the Air Force Emilio Ferruccio Lucchetti, Lucchetti chapel, cemetery of Camisano (Cremona), 1922.

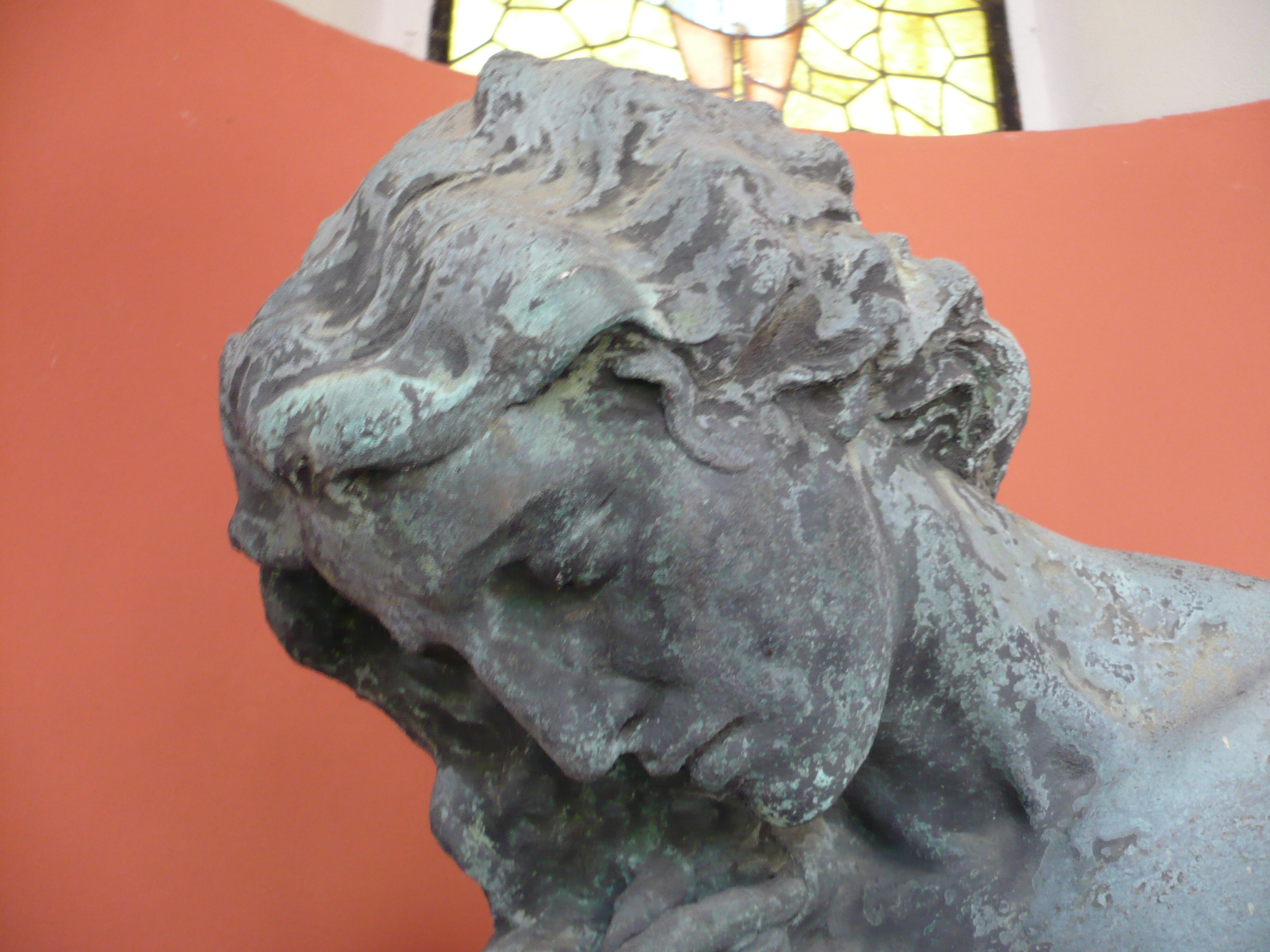
Monument to the fallen Soldier of the Air Force Emilio Ferruccio Lucchetti, Lucchetti chapel, cemetery of Camisano (Cremona), 1922.

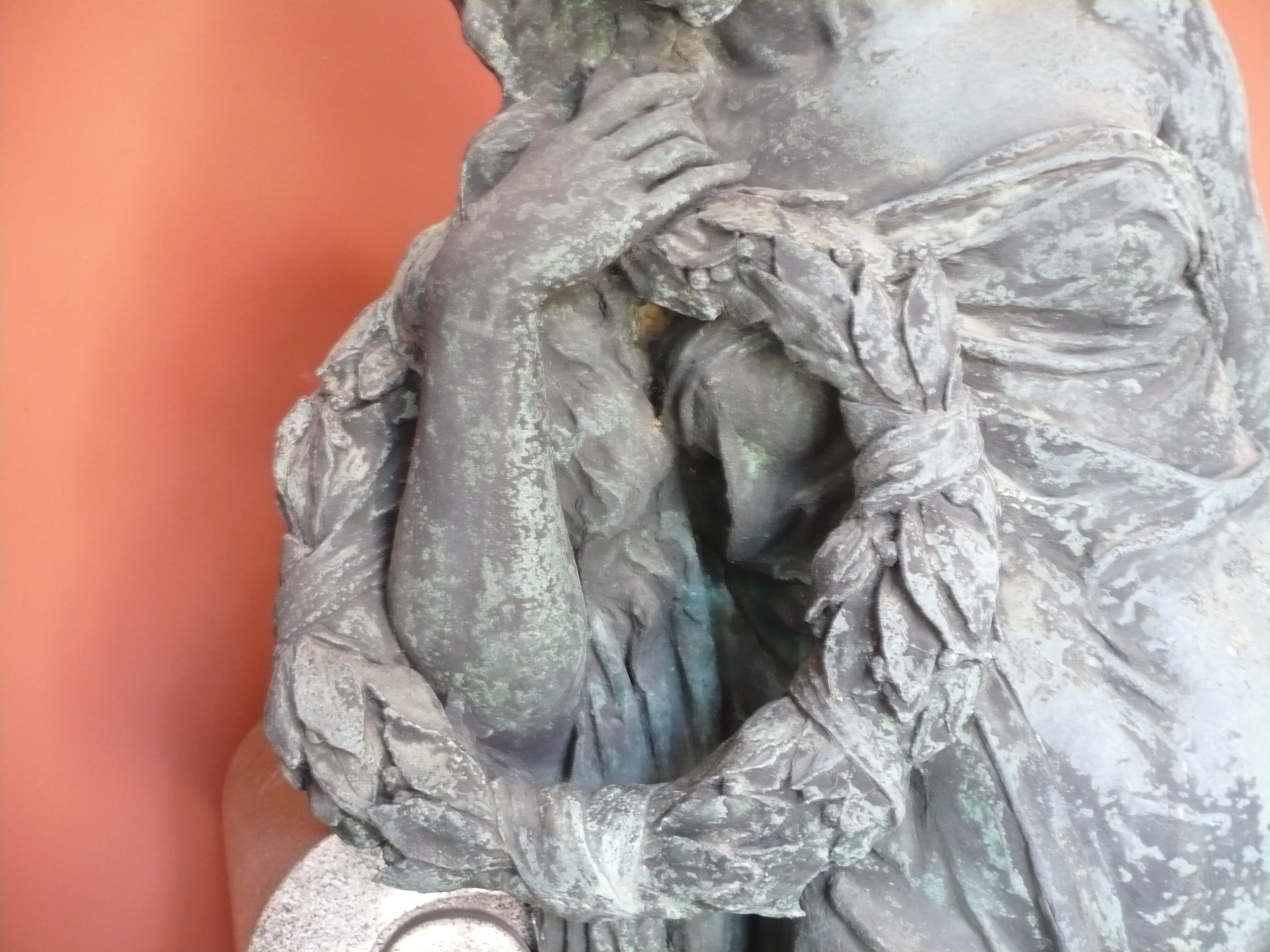
Monument to the fallen Soldier of the Air Force Emilio Ferruccio Lucchetti, Lucchetti chapel, cemetery of Camisano (Cremona), 1922.

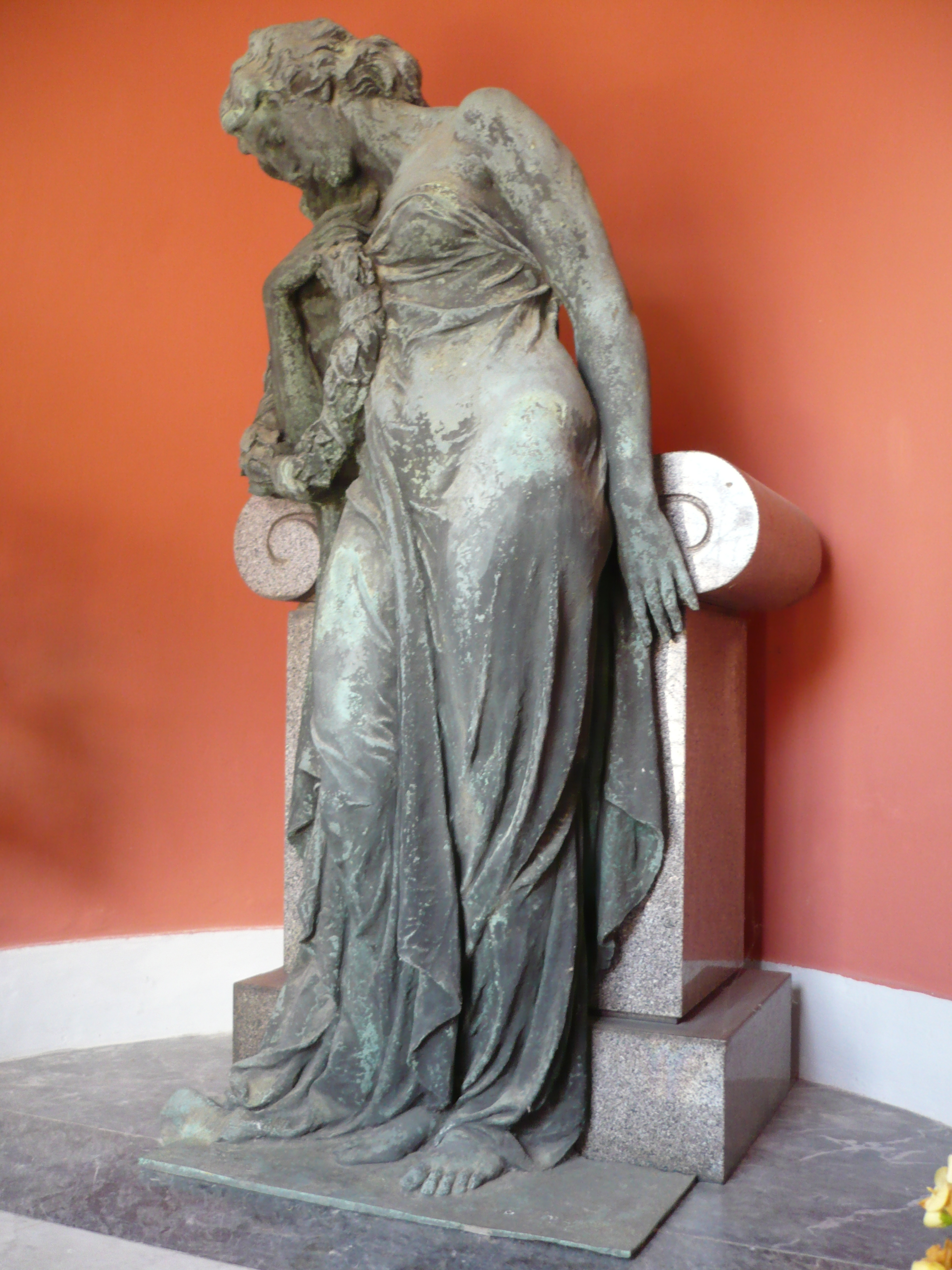
Monument to the fallen Soldier of the Air Force Emilio Ferruccio Lucchetti, Lucchetti chapel, cemetery of Camisano (Cremona), 1922.

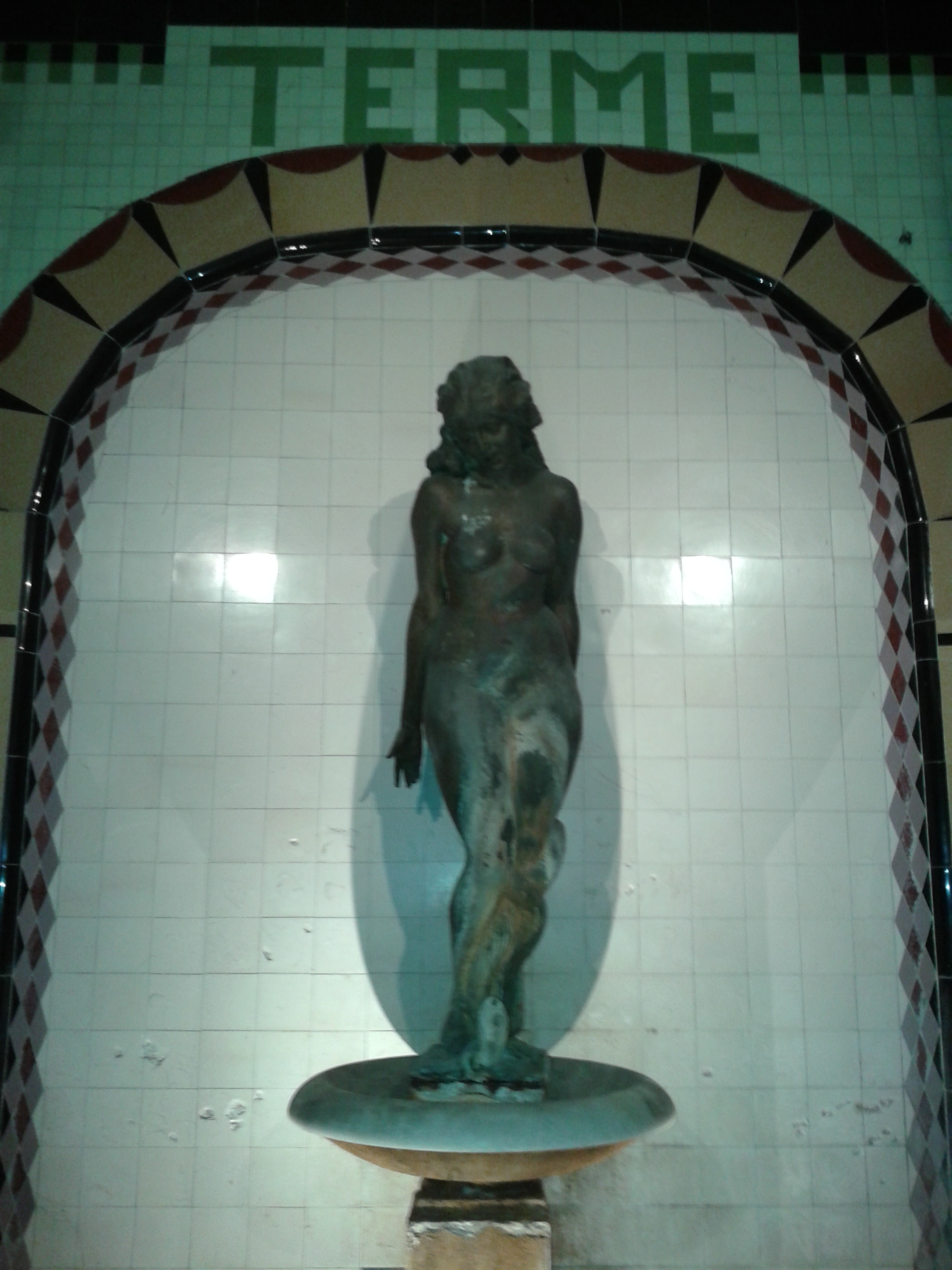
Goddess Hygeia, Albergo Diurno Venezia, Milan, ca. 1924-1925.

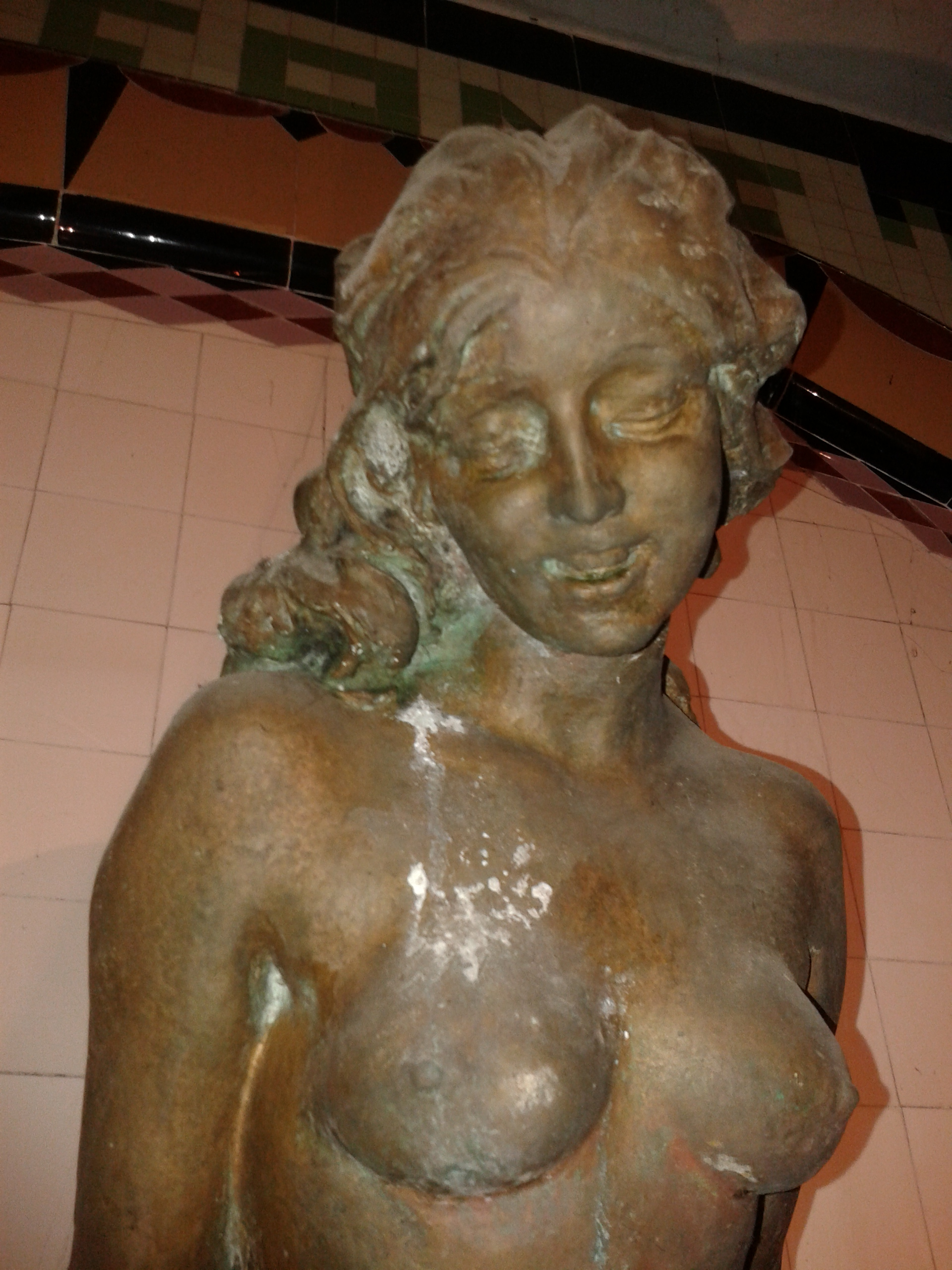
A detail of Goddess Hygeia.

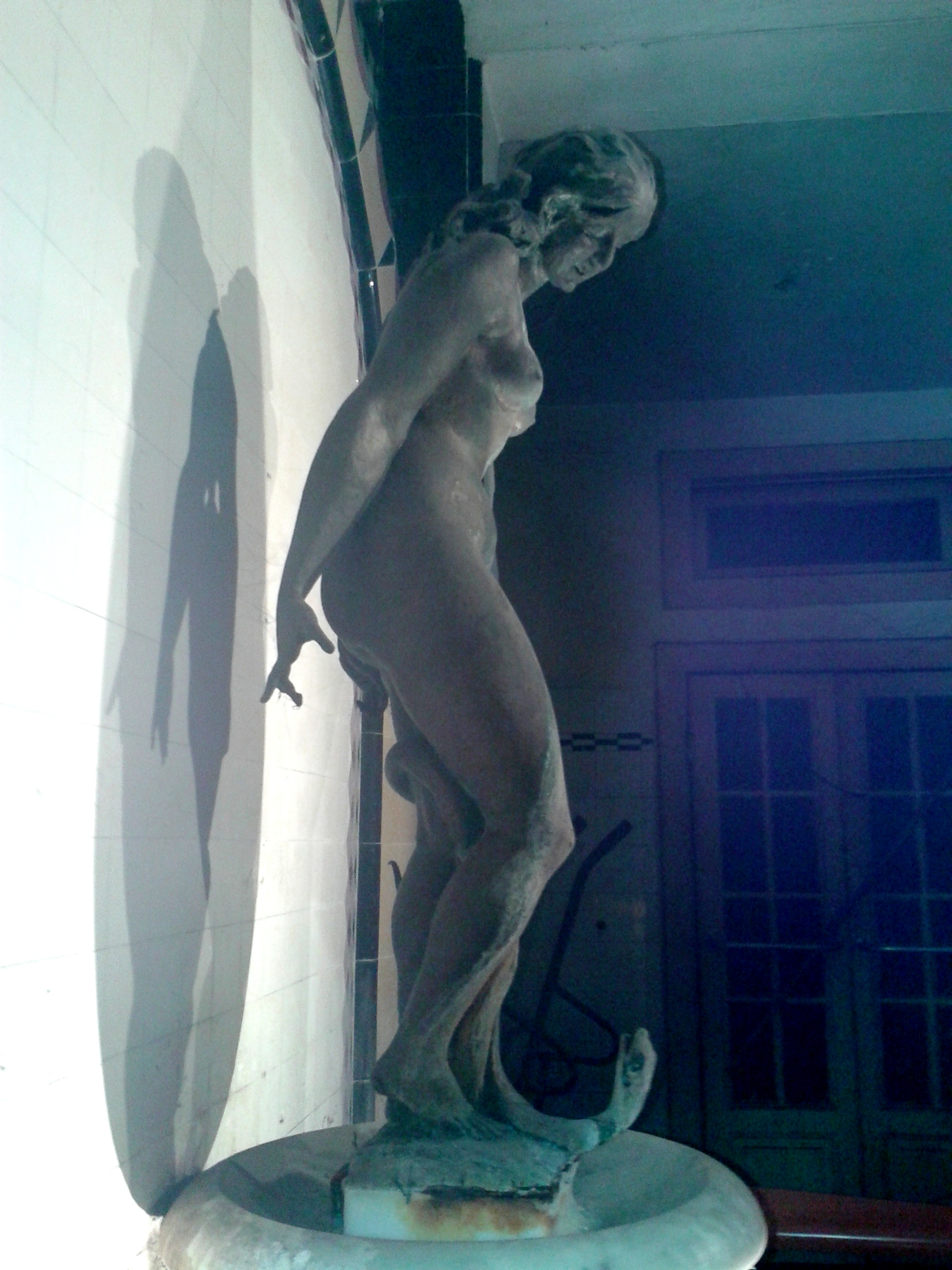
Goddess Hygeia.

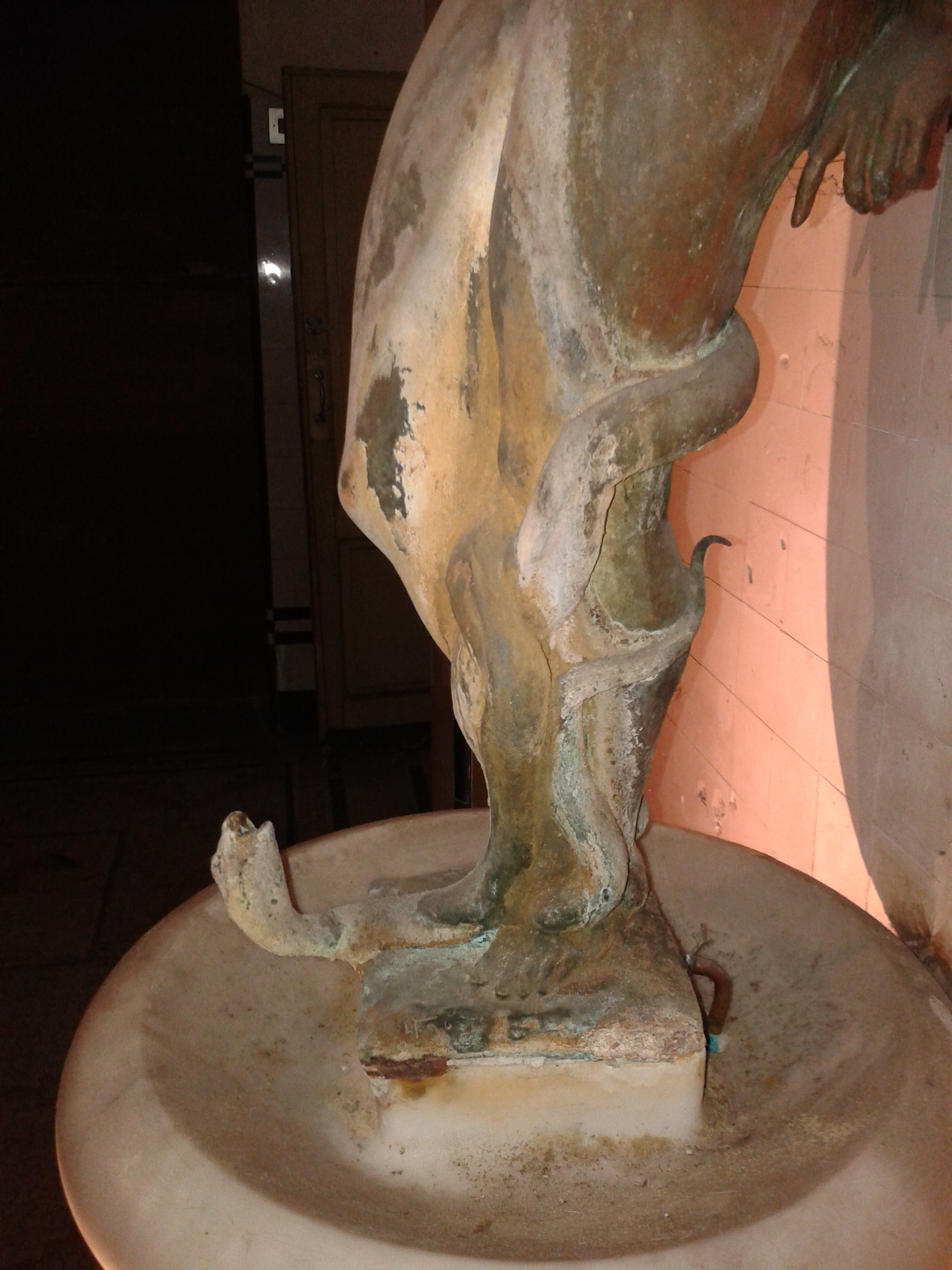
The snake of Goddess Hygeia seen from the right.

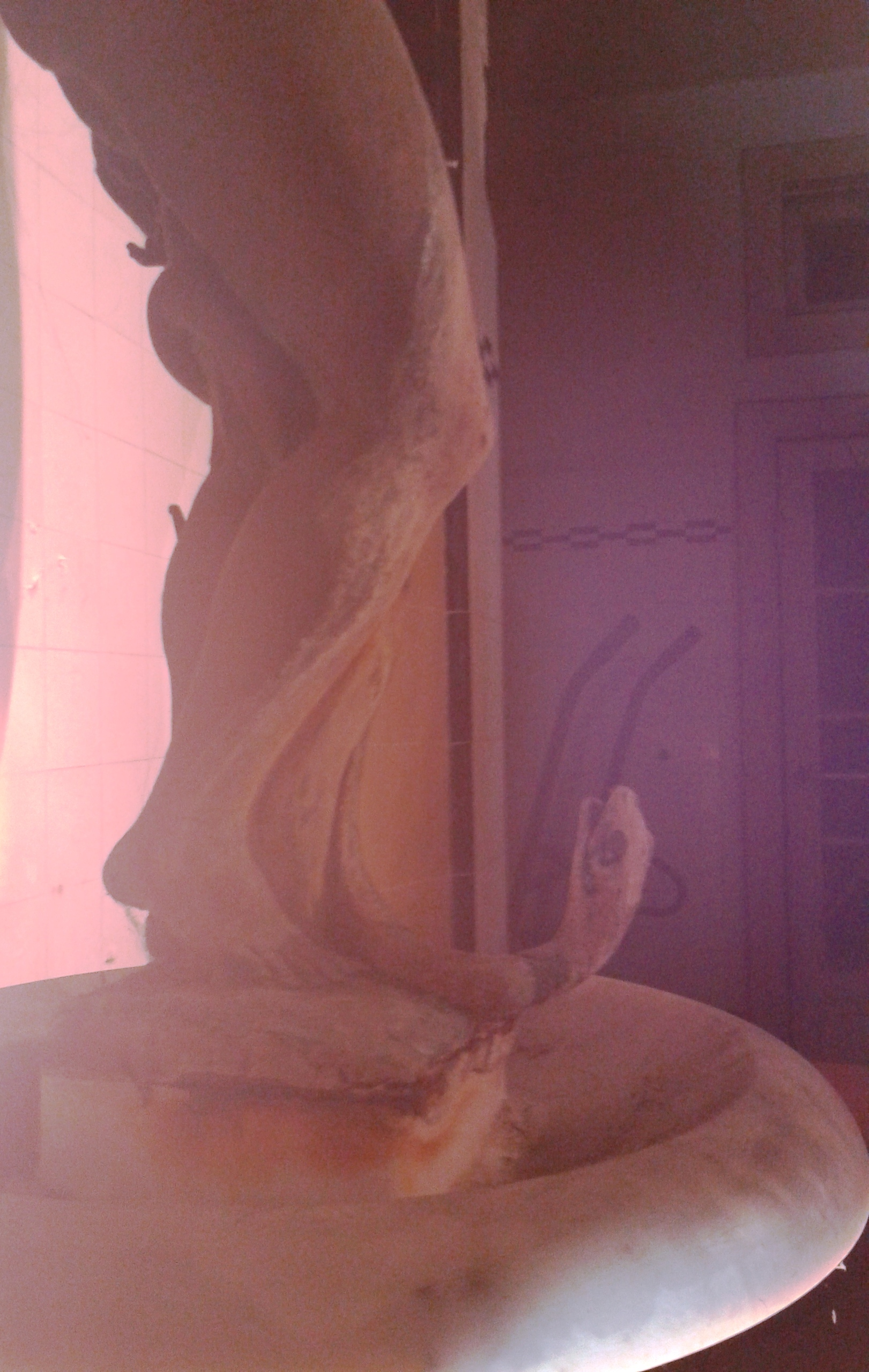
The snake of Goddess Hygeia seen from the left.

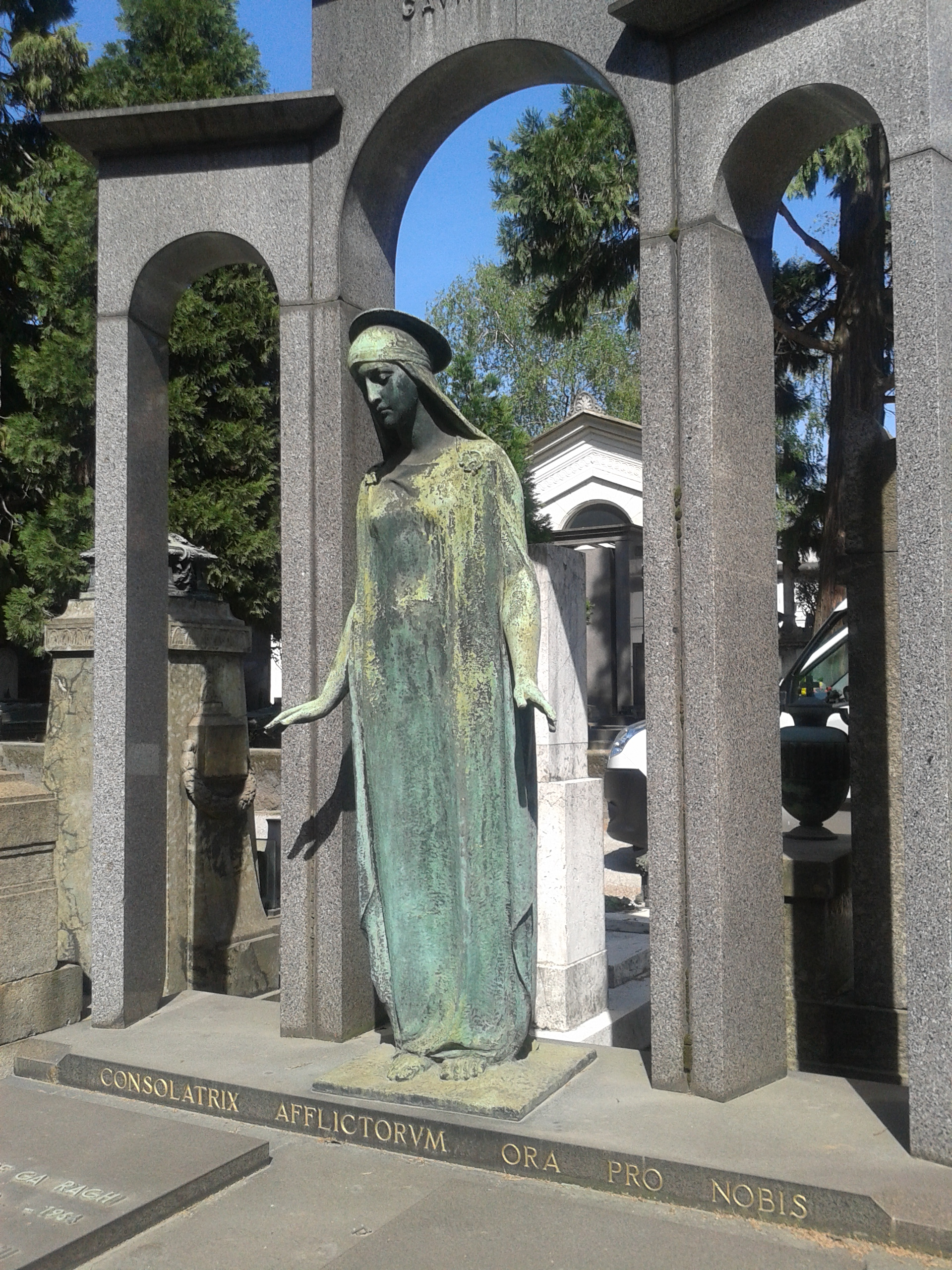
Gaviraghi Tomb, Cimitero Monumentale di Milano, 1940.
