= Cesare Chiodi =

Italian civil engineer and urban planner (1885–1969)

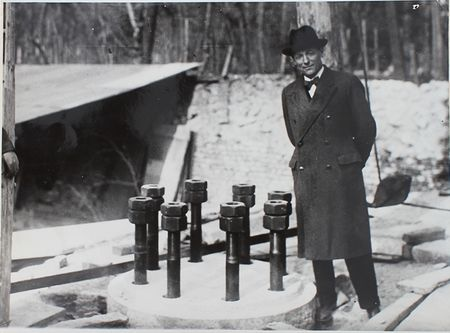
- Cesare Chiodi
- Born: 4 April 1885; Milan, Kingdom of Italy
- Died: 29 August 1969 (aged 84); Albavilla, Province of Como, Italy
- Occupations: Civil engineer, urban planner, academic

Cesare Chiodi (4 April 1885 – 29 August 1969) was an Italian civil engineer, urban planner and academic, one of the leading figures in the development of urban planning studies in 20th-century Italy. A central figure at the Polytechnic University of Milan, he played a major role in shaping urban planning education and postwar reconstruction policies.

== Life and career ==
Born in Milan, Chiodi graduated in civil engineering in 1908 from the Regio Istituto tecnico superiore (now the Polytechnic University of Milan). He began his academic career shortly thereafter, obtaining the libera docenza in bridge construction in 1914. He took part in relief efforts following the 1908 Calabria earthquake and served as an officer in the Corps of Engineers during World War I.

Elected to the Milan City Council in 1920, he served as assessor for building and urban planning (1922–1925), engaging with the city's regulatory plan and participating in international planning congresses.

In 1929–1930, Chiodi promoted the establishment of the course in urban planning at the Polytechnic University, making it a structured academic subject for engineers and architects. In 1937, he founded the Institute of Urban Planning Techniques. His book La città moderna. Tecnica urbanistica (1935; 2nd ed. 1945) became a landmark text in Italian planning studies. He taught until 1955.

As a professional, he participated in numerous competitions for master plans (including Milan, Grosseto and Verona) and designed residential, industrial and public buildings. After World War II he contributed to studies and advisory commissions for the reconstruction and planning of Milan.

Chiodi was also president of the Associazione nazionale ingegneri e architetti italiani and, from 1946 to 1964, president of the Touring Club Italiano, guiding its postwar revival.

== Selected works ==
- La città moderna. Tecnica urbanistica (Milan, 1935; 1945)
- Studi e proposte degli ingegneri milanesi intorno ai problemi della ricostruzione edilizia della città (Milan, 1944)

== Sources ==
- Aspetti, problemi e realizzazioni di Milano. Raccolta di scritti in onore di Cesare Chiodi. Milan: Giuffré. 1957.
- Belli, Gemma (2021). "Cesare Chiodi (1885-1969): un urbanista al Touring Club Italiano" (PDF). In Belli, Gemma; Mangone, Fabio; Sessa, Rosa (eds.). L'Italia del Touring Club, 1894-2019. Promozione, tutela e valorizzazione del patrimonio culturale e del paesaggio. Palermo: Caracol. pp. 167–178.
- Lucchini, Francesco (1994). Archivio Cesare Chiodi, materiali e letture. Bologna: Esculapio.
- Riboldazzi, R. (2008). Una città policentrica. Cesare Chiodi e l'urbanistica milanese nei primi anni del fascismo. Milan: Polipress.
- Sandri, Maria Grazia (1988). "L'insegnamento dell'urbanistica alla luce delle nuove esperienze europee: il contributo di C. Chiodi". Rivista milanese di economia. Quaderni. 17 (II): 537–545.
- Tonon, G. (2007). "Attualità e inattualità del pensiero urbanistico di Cesare Chiodi". Urbanistica (134).
