= Foiba =

Type of deep natural sinkhole

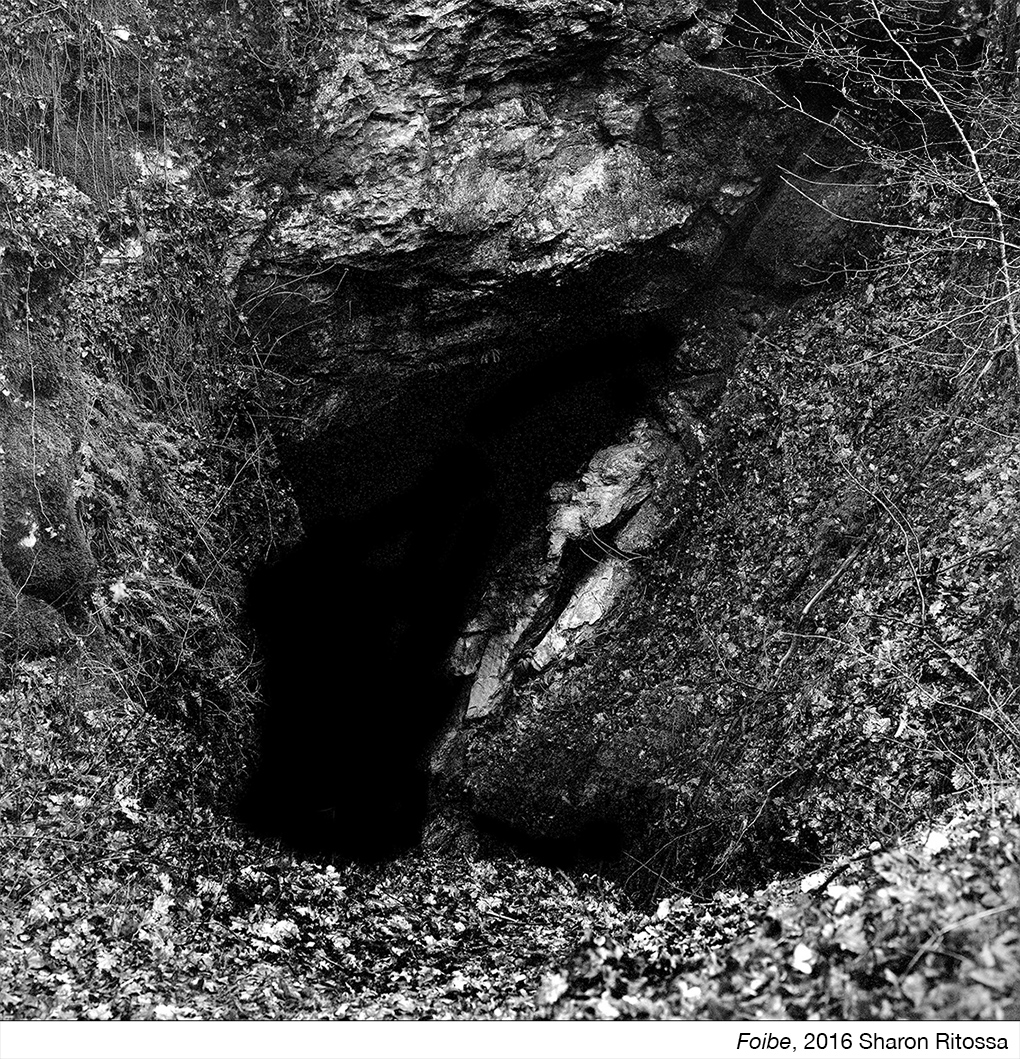
Grotta Plutone is a foiba close to Basovizza, Trieste (Italy)

A foiba (from Italian: pronounced [ˈfɔiba]; plural: foibe [ˈfɔibe] or foibas)—jama (pronounced [ˈja̟mə]) in South Slavic languages scientific and colloquial vocabulary (borrowed since early research in the Western Balkan Dinaric Alpine karst)—is a type of deep natural sinkhole, doline, or sink, and is a collapsed portion of bedrock above a void. Sinks may be a sheer vertical opening into a cave or a shallow depression of many hectares. They are common in the Karst region shared by Italy and Slovenia, as well as in the karst of the Dinaric Alps in Bosnia and Herzegovina, Montenegro, and Croatia. The foibe massacres, a war crime that took place during and after World War II, take their name from the foibe.

== Etymology ==
The Italian word foiba derives from Friulan foibe, which in turn derives from Latin fŏvea 'pit, chasm'. The oldest document on which it is reported is an official report in 1770, written by the Italian naturalist Alberto Fortis, who wrote a series of books on the Dalmatian karst.

== Description ==
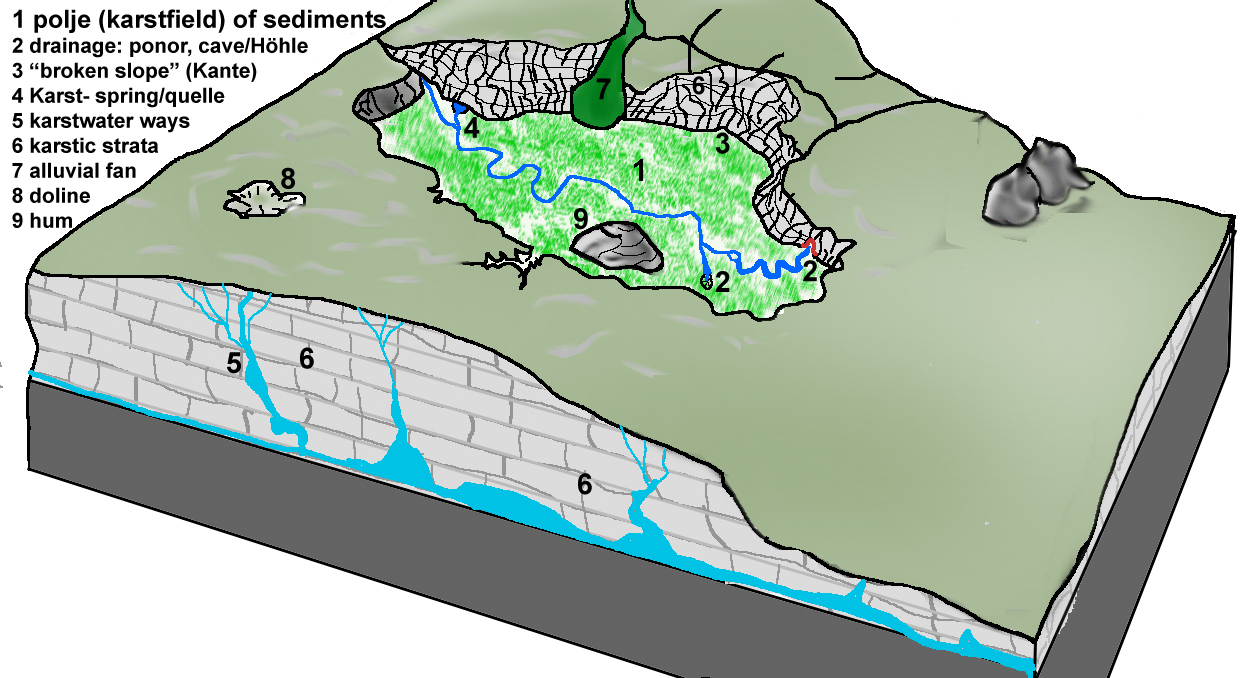
Chart of a karstic basin where the vertical sinkholes (foibe) are visible

Simple scheme of a foiba

They are chasms excavated by water erosion, have the shape of an inverted funnel, and can be up to 200 metres (660 ft) deep. Such formations number in the hundreds in Istria. In karst areas, a sinkhole, sink, or doline is a closed depression draining underground. It can be cylindrical, conical, bowl-shaped or dish-shaped. The diameter ranges from a few to many hundreds of metres. The name "doline" comes from dolina, the Slovenian word for this very common feature. The term "foiba" may also refer to a deep wide chasm of a river at the place where it goes underground.

== Foibe massacres ==
During and right after the end of World War II, OZNA and Yugoslav Partisans killed a number between 11,000 and 20,000 of the local ethnic Italian population (Istrian Italians and Dalmatian Italians), as well against anti-communists in general (even Croats and Slovenes), usually associated with Fascism, Nazism and collaboration with Axis, as well as against real, potential or presumed opponents of Tito communism by throwing their still living bodies into the foibe. This event is known as the foibe massacres. The type of attack was state terrorism, reprisal killings, and ethnic cleansing against Italians. The foibe massacres were followed by the Istrian–Dalmatian exodus.

The Yugoslav partisans intended to kill whoever could oppose or compromise the future annexation of Italian territories: as a preventive purge of real, potential or presumed opponents of Tito communism (Italian, Slovenian and Croatian anti-communists, collaborators and radical nationalists), the Yugoslav partisans exterminated the native anti-fascist autonomists — including the leadership of Italian anti-fascist partisan organizations and the leaders of Fiume's Autonomist Party, like Mario Blasich and Nevio Skull, who supported local independence from both Italy and Yugoslavia — for example in the city of Fiume, where at least 650 were killed after the entry of the Yugoslav units, without any due trial.

== In literature ==
Foiba is also the name of the well-known sinkhole that opens near Pazin Castle, in Pazin, and of the river that flows into it. The place plays a central role in Jules Verne's novel Mathias Sandorf.

== See also ==
- Foibe massacres
- Karst Plateau
