= Foibe massacres =

Mass killings and ethnic cleansing against Italians and pro-Italian Slavs

Coordinates: 45°37′54″N 13°51′45″E

- Part of the Allied war crimes during World War II in Yugoslavia
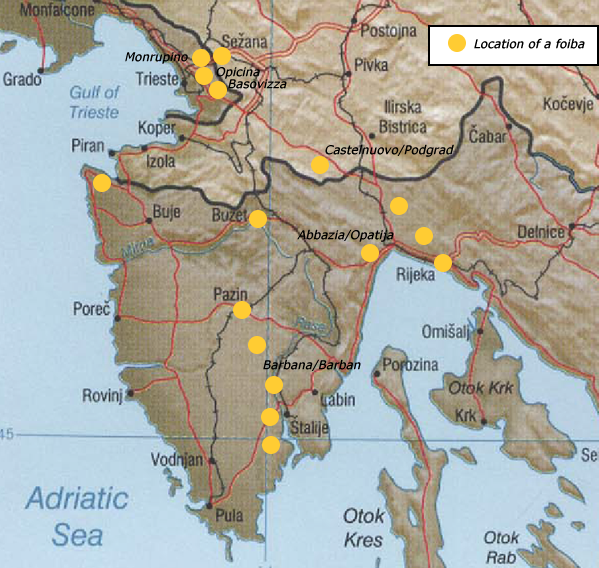
- Locations of some of the foibe
- Native name: Massacri delle foibe (Italian); Poboji v fojbah (Slovene); Masakri fojbe (Croatian)
- Location: Julian March, Kvarner, Dalmatia (Italy and Yugoslavia)
- Date: 1943–1945
- Target: Local ethnic Italians (Istrian and Dalmatian Italians); Members of fascist military and police forces; Italian, German, Croat and Slovene anti-communists against the regime of Josip Broz Tito, presumed to be associated with fascism, Nazism and collaboration with Axis; Preventive purge of real, potential or presumed opponents of Titoism
- Attack type: Ethnic cleansing; Reprisal killings
- Deaths: Estimates range from 3,000 to 5,000 killed, according to other sources 11,000 or 20,000; 4,000 deported
- Perpetrators: Yugoslav Partisans; OZNA

The foibe massacres (Italian: massacri delle foibe; Slovene: poboji v fojbah; Croatian: masakri fojbe), or simply the foibe, refers to mass killings and deportations during and immediately after World War II, mainly committed by Yugoslav Partisans and OZNA in the then-Italian territories (Note: Successively lost by Italy to Yugoslavia after the Treaty of Peace (1947).) of Julian March (Karst Region and Istria), Kvarner and Dalmatia, against local Italians (Istrian Italians and Dalmatian Italians) and Slavs, primarily members of fascist and collaborationist forces, and civilians opposed to the new Yugoslav authorities, and Italian, German, Croat and Slovene anti-communists presumed to be associated with fascism, Nazism, collaboration with Axis and preventive purge of real, potential or presumed opponents of the communist regime of Josip Broz Tito. The great majority of victims of the post-war reprisals were members of Croatian, Slovene, Montenegrin and Serb collaborationist armed forces.

Some historians state that these attacks were state terrorism and ethnic cleansing against local Italians (Istrian Italians and Dalmatian Italians), including anti-fascist militias and civilians. Others state that this was not ethnic cleansing, and that the events need to be understood in light of the prior 20-year fascist oppression of Slavic minorities followed by the Italian invasion of Yugoslavia, occupation and brutal repression of the resistance movement. Italian and German reports mention members of local fascist militias as the primary victims in 1943. Among documented victims from Trieste in 1945, 80% were members of fascist and collaborationist forces, 97% were males, while of the 3% female victims at least half were Slovene. Victims also included unarmed and uninvolved civilians, killed in a preventive purge of real, potential or presumed opponents of Titoism, killed along with native anti-fascist autonomists — including the leadership of Italian anti-fascist partisan organizations, opposed to Yugoslav annexation, and leaders of Fiume's Autonomist Party, Mario Blasich and Nevio Skull, who supported local independence from both Italy and Yugoslavia – resulting in the purge in the city of Fiume, where at least 650 were killed during and after the war by Yugoslav units, tried for war crimes before military courts.

The estimated number of foibe victims is disputed, varying from hundreds to thousands, according to some sources 11,000 or 20,000. Many foibe victim lists are deficient, with repeated names, victims of fascist or German forces, victims killed in combat, or who were still alive or died in completely different circumstances. Italians and Germans also used foibe to dispose of victims. Italian historian Raoul Pupo estimates 3,000 to 4,000 total victims, across all areas of former Yugoslavia and Italy from 1943 to 1945, noting that estimates of 10,000 to 12,000 must also include those killed or missing in combat, and states victim numbers of 20,000 to 30,000 are "pure propaganda". Historians note that it is difficult to determine the ethnicity of victims, since fascist authorities forcibly Italianized people's names, however of documented victims from Italian-majority Trieste, at least 23% were either Slavs or had at least one Slavic parent.

The foibe massacres were followed by the Istrian–Dalmatian exodus, which was the post-World War II exodus and departure of local ethnic Italians (Istrian Italians and Dalmatian Italians) from the Yugoslav territory of Istria, Kvarner, the Julian March, lost by Italy after the Treaty of Paris (1947), as well as Dalmatia, towards Italy, and in smaller numbers, towards the Americas, Australia and South Africa. According to various sources, the exodus is estimated to have amounted to between 230,000 and 350,000 Italians. A joint Italian-Slovene commission noted that the majority of the exodus happened in the early 1950s, more than five years after the massacres, when it was clear these parts would become permanently Yugoslav, and that the exodus had multiple causes, including war-caused economic hardship and general repressive policies in the immediate postwar years.

Historians put the events in the context of broader postwar violence in Europe, including in Italy, where the Italian resistance and others killed an estimated 12,000 to 26,000 Italians, usually in extrajudicial executions, the great majority in Northern Italy, just in April and May 1945, while some 12 to 14.5 million ethnic Germans were expelled from Central and Eastern Europe, with a death toll of 500,000 to 2.5 million.

== Origin and meaning of the term ==
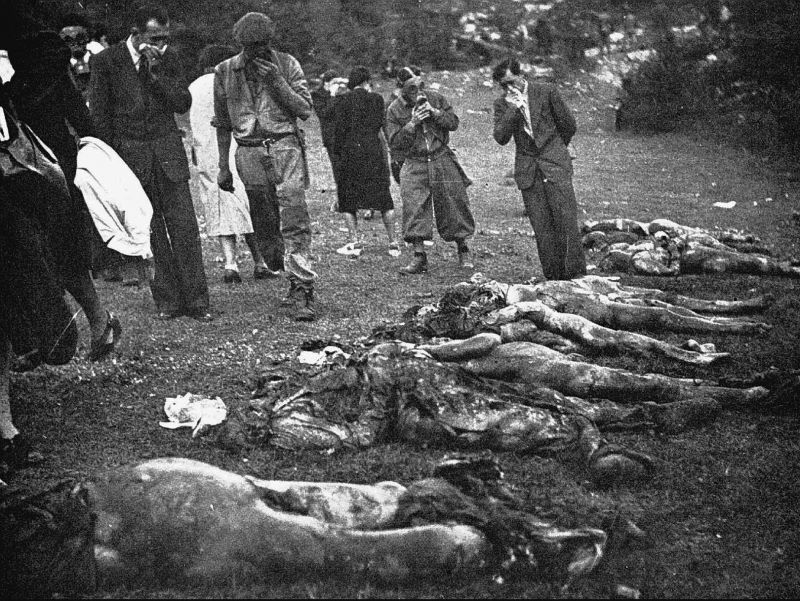
Labin, December 1943: bodies recovered from a foiba by Italian firefighters and German soldiers. Local civilians are trying to identify relatives or friends.

The term refers to some victims who were thrown alive into the foibe (from Italian: pronounced [ˈfɔibe]), deep natural sinkholes characteristic of the Karst Region. The name was derived from a local geological feature, a type of deep karst sinkhole called foiba. The term includes by extension killings and "burials" in other subterranean formations, such as the Basovizza "foiba", which is a mine shaft.

In a wider or symbolic sense, some authors used the term to apply to all disappearances or killings of Italian and Slavic people in the territories occupied by Yugoslav forces. Others included deaths resulting from the forced deportation of Italians, or those who died while trying to flee from these contested lands.

In Italy the term foibe has, for some authors and scholars, (Note: See Raoul Pupo, Gianni Oliva, Arrigo Petacco et alia.) taken on a symbolic meaning; for them it refers in a broader sense to all the disappearances or killings of Italian people in the territories occupied by Yugoslav forces. According to author Raoul Pupo:

It is well known that the majority of the victims didn't end their lives in a Karst cave, but met their deaths on the road to deportation, as well as in jails or in Yugoslav concentration camps. (Note: Italian: È noto infatti che la maggior parte delle vittime non finì i suoi giorni sul fondo delle cavità carsiche, ma incontrò la morte lungo la strada verso la deportazione, ovvero nelle carceri o nei campi di concentramento jugoslavi.)

The terror spread by these disappearances and killings eventually caused the majority of the Italians of Istria, Fiume, and Zara to flee to other parts of Italy or the Free Territory of Trieste. Raoul Pupo wrote:

[...] the horrible death in a cave [...] became the very representation of a barbaric and obscure violence hanging over as a potential doom of an entire community. This is the image that settles in the memory of contemporaries, and become an obsession in moments of political and national uncertainty. This has the power to condition appreciably the choices of the people, such as the one by Istrians that decide to leave their lands assigned to Yugoslav sovereignty [...]

== Background ==
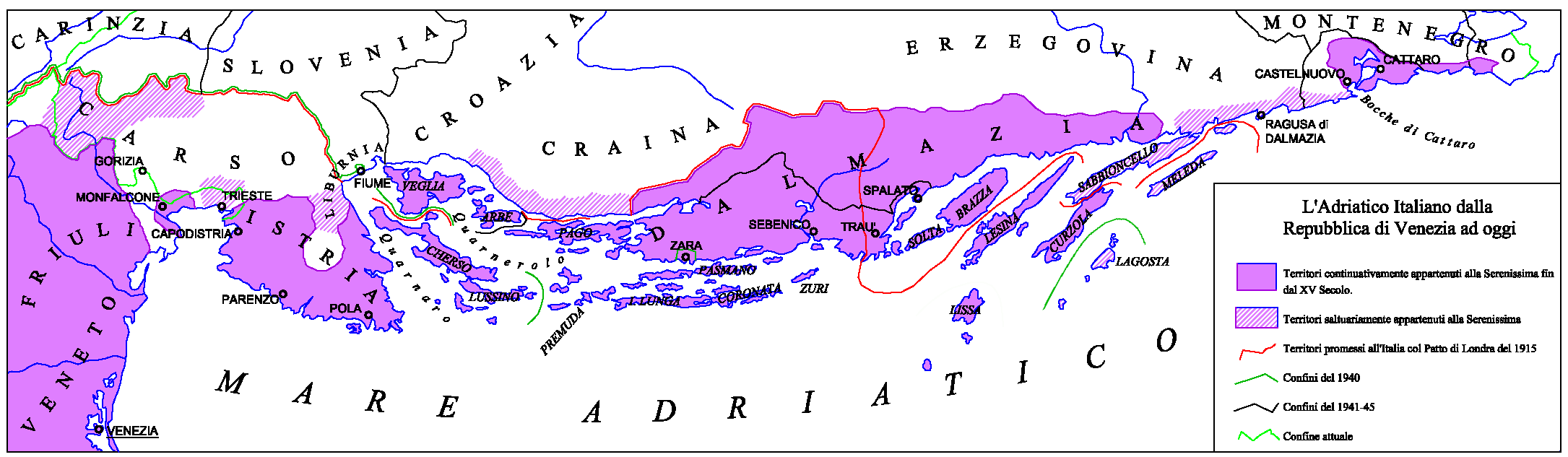
Map of Dalmatia and Istria with the boundaries set by the Treaty of London (1915) (red line) and those actually obtained from Italy (green line). The black line marks the border of the Governorate of Dalmatia (1941–1943). The ancient domains of the Republic of Venice are indicated in fuchsia (dashed diagonally, the territories that belonged occasionally).

=== From Roman era to early history ===
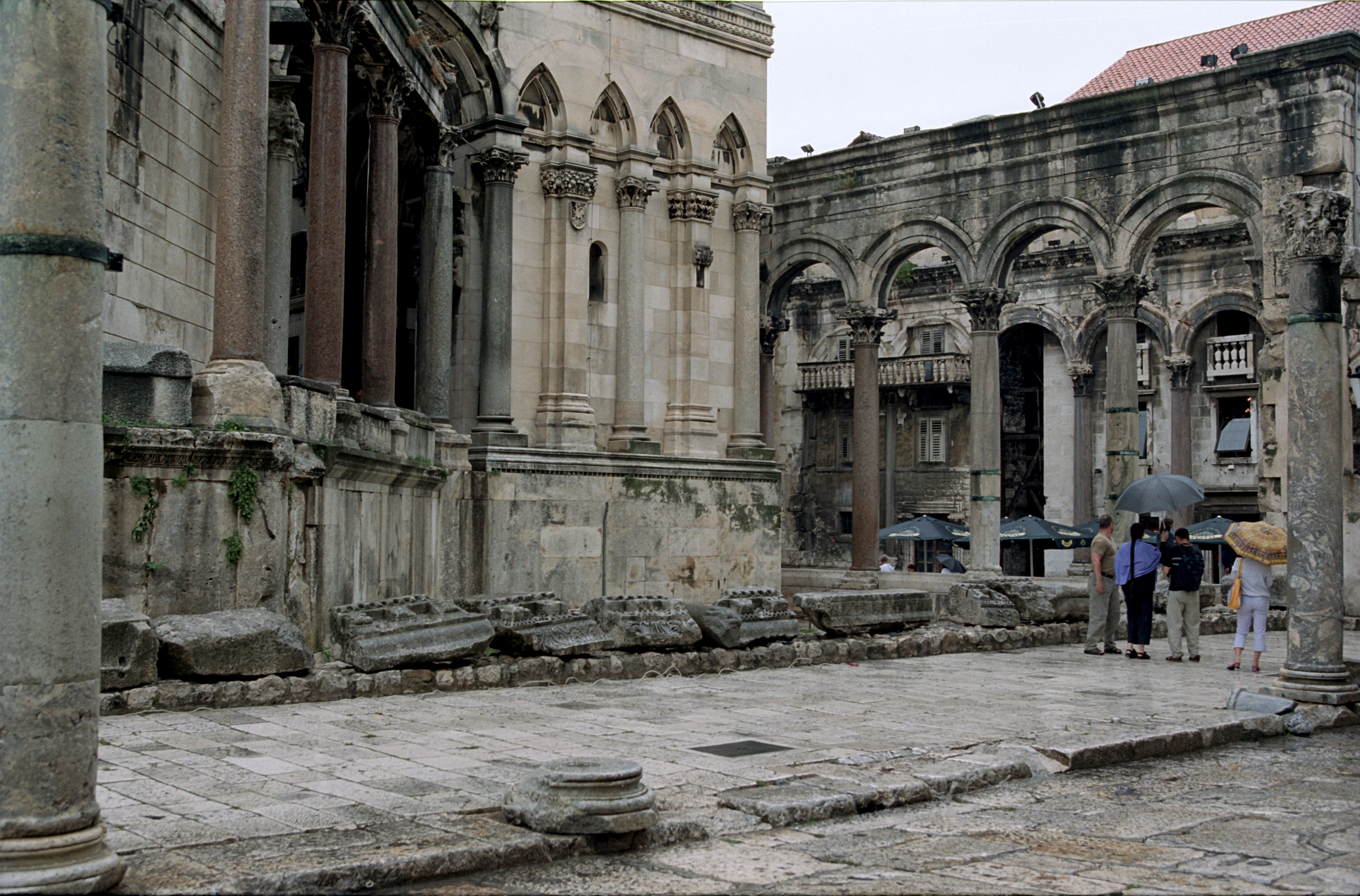
Palace of the Roman Emperor Diocletian, Split

Roman Dalmatia was fully Latinized by 476 AD when the Western Roman Empire disappeared. In the Early Middle Ages, the territory of the Byzantine province of Dalmatia reached in the North up to the river Sava, and was part of the Praetorian prefecture of Illyricum. In the middle of the 6th and the beginning of the 7th century, the Slavic migrations to the Balkans began, which caused the Romance-speaking population, descendants of Romans and Illyrians (speaking Dalmatian), to flee to the coast and islands. The hinterland, semi-depopulated by the Barbarian Invasions, Slavic tribes settled. The Dalmatian cities retained their Romance culture and language in cities such as Zadar, Split, and Dubrovnik. Their own Vulgar Latin, developed into Dalmatian, a now extinct Romance language. These coastal cities (politically part of the Byzantine Empire) maintained political, cultural and economic links with Italy, through the Adriatic Sea. On the other side communications with the mainland were difficult because of the Dinaric Alps. Due to the sharp orography of Dalmatia, even communications between the different Dalmatian cities, occurred mainly through the sea. This helped Dalmatian cities to develop a unique Romance culture, despite the mostly Slavicized mainland.

Historian Theodor Mommsen wrote that Istria (included in the Regio X Venetia et Histria of Roman Italy since Augustus) was fully romanized in the 5th century AD. Between 500 and 700 AD, Slavs settled in Southeastern Europe (Eastern Adriatic), and their number ever increased, and with the Ottoman invasion Slavs were pushed from the south and east. This led to Italic people becoming ever more confined to urban areas, while some areas of the countryside were populated by Slavs, with exceptions in western and southern Istria which remained fully Romance-speaking.

By the 11th century, most of the interior mountainous areas of northern and eastern Istria (Liburnia) were inhabited by South Slavs, while the Romance population continued to prevail in the south and west of the peninsula. Linguistically, the Romance inhabitants of Istria were most probably divided into two main linguistic groups: in the north-west, the speakers of a Rhaeto-Romance language similar to Ladin and Friulian prevailed, whereas in the south the natives most probably spoke a variant of Dalmatian. One modern claim suggests the original language of the romanized Istrians survived the invasions, this being Istriot, which was spoken by some near Pula.

Via conquests, the Republic of Venice, between the 9th century and 1797, extended its dominion to coastal parts of Istria and Dalmatia. Thus Venice invaded and attacked Zadar multiple times, especially devastating the city in 1202 when Venice used the crusaders, on their Fourth Crusade, to lay siege, then ransack, demolish and rob the city, the population fleeing into countryside. Pope Innocent III excommunicated the Venetians and crusaders for attacking a Catholic city. The Venetians used the same Crusade to attack the Dubrovnik Republic, and force it to pay tribute, then continued to sack Christian Orthodox Constantinople where they looted, terrorized, and vandalized the city, killing 2.000 civilians, raping nuns and destroying Christian Churches, with Venice receiving a big portion of the plundered treasures.

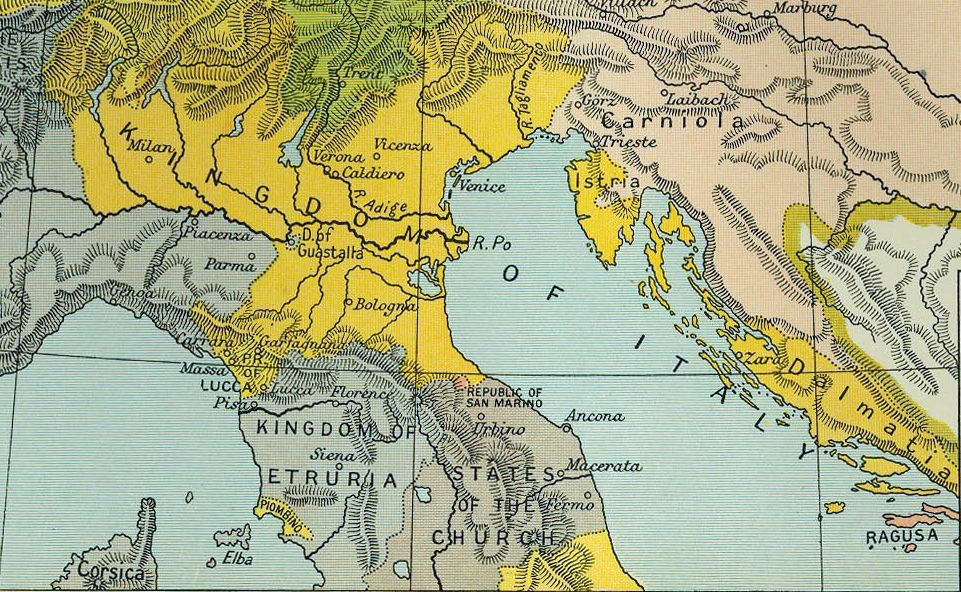
The Napoleonic Kingdom of Italy from 1806 to 1810 included Istria and Dalmatia that had belonged to the Republic of Venice until 1797.

The coastal areas and cities of Istria came under Venetian Influence in the 9th century. In 1145, the cities of Pula, Koper and Izola rose against the Republic of Venice but were defeated, and were since further controlled by Venice. On 15 February 1267, Poreč was formally incorporated with the Venetian state. Other coastal towns followed shortly thereafter. The Republic of Venice gradually dominated the whole coastal area of western Istria and the area to Plomin on the eastern part of the peninsula. Dalmatia was first and finally sold to the Republic of Venice in 1409 but Venetian Dalmatia was not fully consolidated from 1420.

From the Middle Ages onwards, numbers of Slavic people near and on the Adriatic coast were ever increasing, due to their expanding population and due to pressure from the Ottomans pushing them from the south and east. This led to Italic people becoming ever more confined to urban areas, while the countryside was populated by Slavs, with certain isolated exceptions. In particular, the population was divided into urban-coastal communities (mainly Romance speakers) and rural communities (mainly Slavic speakers), with small minorities of Morlachs and Istro-Romanians.

Republic of Venice influenced the neolatins of Istria and Dalmatia until 1797, when it was conquered by Napoleon: Capodistria and Pola were important centers of art and culture during the Italian Renaissance. Istria and Dalmatia were then aggregated to the Napoleonic Kingdom of Italy in 1805, and annexed to the Illyrian Provinces in 1809 (for some years also the Republic of Ragusa was included, since 1808). From the Middle Ages to the 19th century, Italian and Slavic communities in Istria and Dalmatia had lived peacefully side by side because they did not know the national identification, given that they generically defined themselves as "Istrians" and "Dalmatians", of "Romance" or "Slavic" culture.

=== Austrian Empire ===
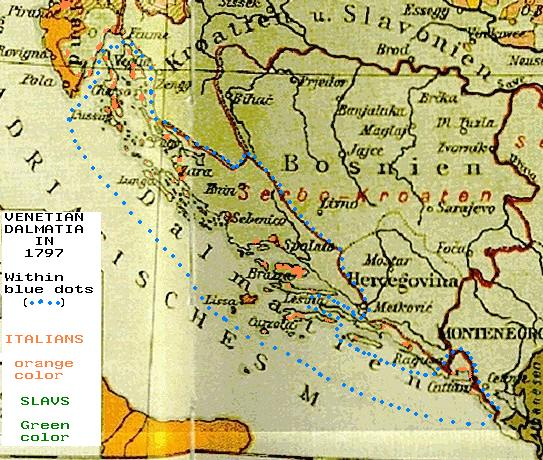
Austrian linguistic map from 1896. In green the areas where Slavs were the majority of the population, in orange the areas where Istrian Italians and Dalmatian Italians were the majority of the population. The boundaries of Venetian Dalmatia in 1797 are delimited with blue dots.

After the fall of Napoleon (1814), Istria, Kvarner and Dalmatia were annexed to the Austrian Empire. Many Istrian Italians and Dalmatian Italians looked with sympathy towards the Risorgimento movement that fought for the unification of Italy. However, after the Third Italian War of Independence (1866), when the Veneto and Friuli regions were ceded by the Austrians to the newly formed Kingdom Italy, Istria and Dalmatia remained part of the Austro-Hungarian Empire, together with other Italian-speaking areas on the eastern Adriatic. This triggered the gradual rise of Italian irredentism among many Italians in Istria, Kvarner and Dalmatia, who demanded the unification of the Julian March, Kvarner and Dalmatia with Italy. The Italians in Istria, Kvarner and Dalmatia supported the Italian Risorgimento: as a consequence, the Austrians saw the Italians as enemies and favored the Slav communities of Istria, Kvarner and Dalmatia. Before 1859, Italian was the language of administration, education, the press, and the Austrian navy; people who wished to acquire higher social standing and separate from the Slav peasantry became Italians. In the years after 1866, Italians lost their privileges in Austria-Hungary, their assimilation of the Slavs came to an end, and they found themselves under growing pressure by other rising nations; with the rising Slav tide after 1890, italianized Slavs reverted to being Croats.

Austrian rulers found use of the racial antagonism and financed Slav schools and promoted Croatian as the official language, and many Italians chose voluntary exile. During the meeting of the Council of Ministers of 12 November 1866, Emperor Franz Joseph I of Austria outlined a wide-ranging project aimed at the Germanization or Slavization of the areas of the empire with an Italian presence:

His Majesty expressed the precise order that action be taken decisively against the influence of the Italian elements still present in some regions of the Crown and, appropriately occupying the posts of public, judicial, masters employees as well as with the influence of the press, work in South Tyrol, Dalmatia and Littoral for the Germanization and Slavization of these territories according to the circumstances, with energy and without any regard. His Majesty calls the central offices to the strong duty to proceed in this way to what has been established.

— Franz Joseph I of Austria, Council of the Crown of 12 November 1866

In 1909, Italian lost its status as the official language of Dalmatia in favor of Croatian: thus Italian could no longer be used in the public and administrative sphere.

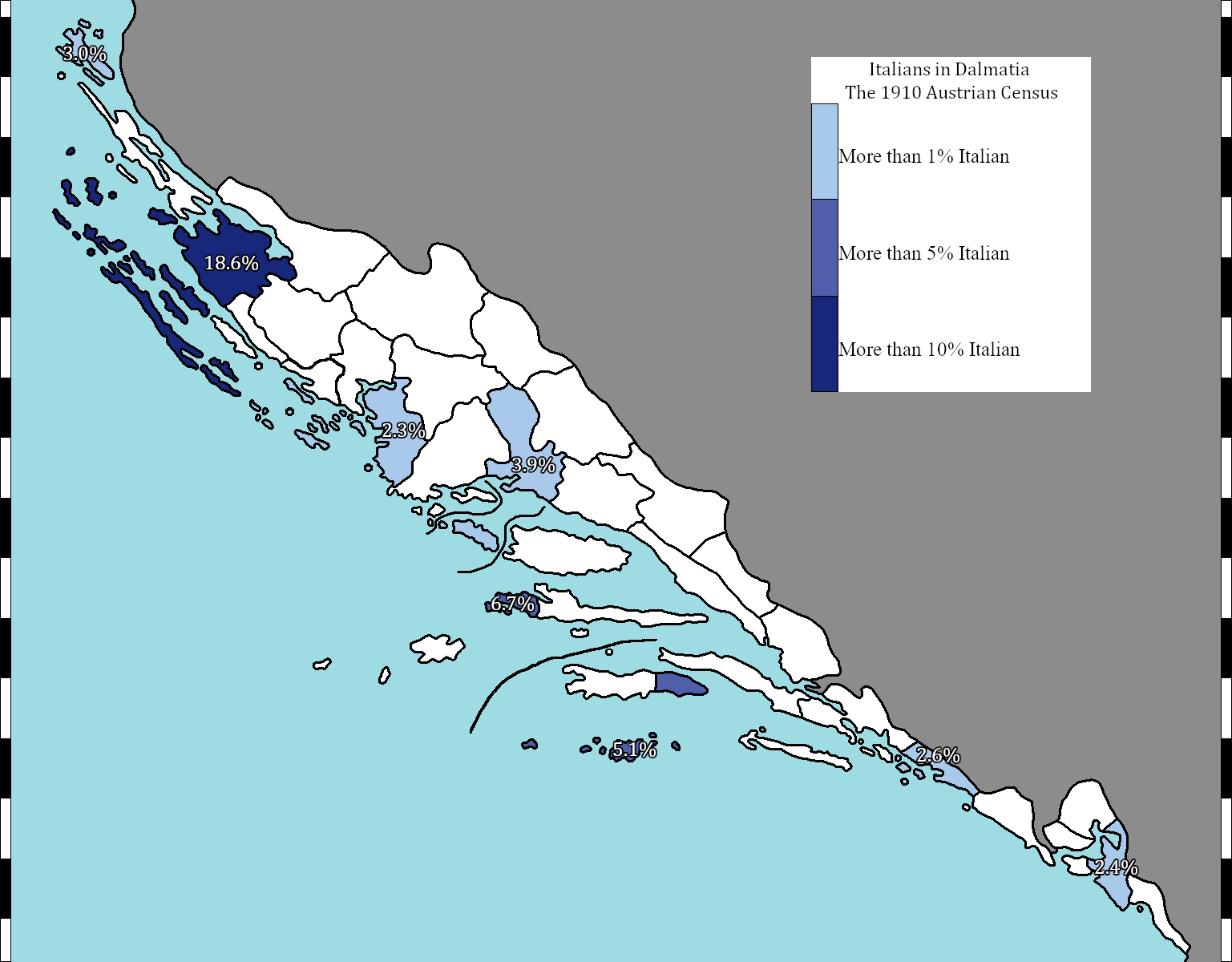
Proportion of Dalmatian Italians in districts of Dalmatia in 1910, per the Austro-Hungarian census

Istrian Italians were more than 50% of the total population of Istria for centuries, while making up about a third of the population in 1900. Dalmatia had a local Italian-speaking population (Dalmatian Italians) of 20% in 1816, mostly concentrated in its maritime cities. In Dalmatia, there was a constant decline of the Italian-speaking population, in a context of repression that also took on violent connotations. During this period, Austrians carried out an aggressive anti-Italian policy through a forced Slavization of Dalmatia. According to Austrian census, the Italian-speaking Dalmatians formed 12.5% of the population in 1865. In the 1910 Austro-Hungarian census, Istria had a population of 57.8% Slavic-speakers (Croat and Slovene), and 38.1% Italian speakers. For the Austrian Kingdom of Dalmatia, (i.e. Dalmatia), the 1910 numbers were 96.2% Slavic speakers and 2.8% Italian speakers. In Rijeka the Italians were the relative majority in the municipality (48.61% in 1910), and in addition to the large Croatian community (25.95% in the same year), there was also a fair Hungarian minority (13.03%). According to the official Croatian census of 2011, there are 2,445 Italians in Rijeka (equal to 1.9% of the total population).

The Italian-speaking population in Dalmatia was concentrated in the major coastal cities. In the city of Split in 1890 there were 1,971 Dalmatian Italians (9% of the population), in Zadar 7,672 (27%), in Šibenik 1,090 (5%), in Kotor 646 (12%) and in Dubrovnik 356 (3%). In other Dalmatian localities, according to Austrian censuses, the number of Italian-speaking population experienced a decrease: in the twenty years 1890–1910, in Rab they went from 225 to 151, in Vis from 352 to 92, in Pag from 787 to 23, completely disappearing in almost all inland locations.

While Slavic-speakers made up 80-95% of the Dalmatia populace, only Italian language schools existed until 1848, and due to restrictive voting laws, the Italian-speaking aristocratic minority retained political control of Dalmatia. Only after Austria liberalised elections in 1870, allowing more majority Slavs to vote, did Croatian parties gain control. Croatian finally became an official language in Dalmatia in 1883, along with Italian. Yet minority Italian-speakers continued to wield strong influence, since Austria favoured Italians for government work, thus in the Austrian capital of Dalmatia, Zara, the proportion of Italians continued to grow, making it the only Dalmatian city with an Italian majority.

In 1905, a dispute arose in the Austrian Imperial Council over whether Austria should pay for Dalmatia. It has been argued that in the conclusion of the April Laws is written "given by Banus Count Keglevich of Bužim", which explained the historical affiliation of Dalmatia to Hungary. Two years later Dalmatia elected representatives to the Austrian Imperial Council. In 1909, Italian lost its status as the official language of Dalmatia in favor of Croatian only; previously, both languages were recognized. Thus, Italian could no longer be used in the public and administrative sphere.

=== World War I and its aftermath ===
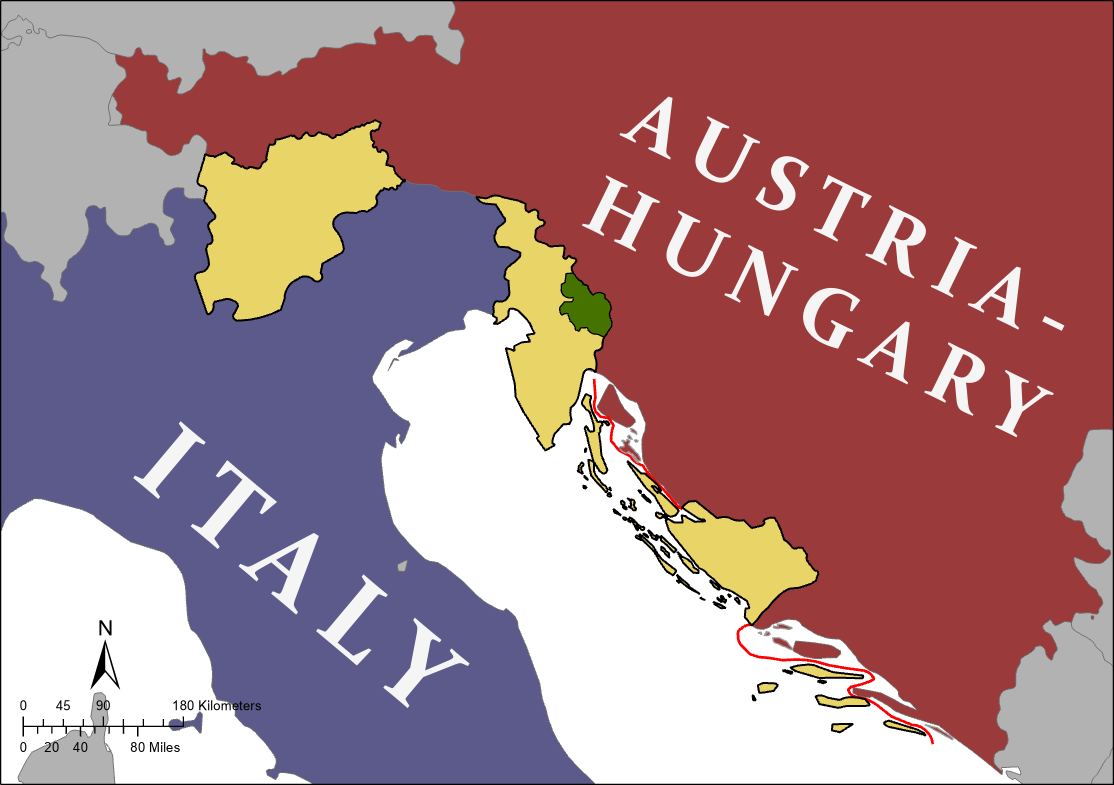
Territories promised to Italy by the London Pact (1915), i.e. Trentino-Alto Adige, the Julian March and Dalmatia (tan), and the Snežnik Plateau area (green). Dalmatia, after the WWI, however, was not assigned to Italy but to Yugoslavia

In 1915, Italy abrogated its alliance and declared war on the Austro-Hungarian Empire, leading to bloody conflict mainly on the Isonzo and Piave fronts. Britain, France and Russia had been "keen to bring neutral Italy into World War I on their side. However, Italy drove a hard bargain, demanding extensive territorial concessions once the war had been won". In a deal to bring Italy into the war, under the London Pact, Italy would be allowed to annex not only Italian-speaking Trentino and Trieste, but also German-speaking South Tyrol, Istria (which included large non-Italian communities), and the northern part of Dalmatia including the areas of Zadar (Zara) and Šibenik (Sebenico). Mainly Italian Fiume (present-day Rijeka) was excluded.

Dalmatia was a strategic region during World War I that both Italy and Serbia intended to seize from Austria-Hungary. Italy joined the Triple Entente Allies in 1915 upon agreeing to the Treaty of London that guaranteed Italy the right to annex a large portion of Dalmatia in exchange for Italy's participation on the Allied side. From 5–6 November 1918, Italian forces were reported to have reached Vis, Lastovo, Šibenik, and other localities on the Dalmatian coast. By the end of hostilities in November 1918, the Italian military had seized control of the entire portion of Dalmatia that had been guaranteed to Italy by the Treaty of London and by 17 November had seized Rijeka as well creating the first Governorate of Dalmatia. In 1918, Admiral Enrico Millo declared himself Italy's Governor of Dalmatia. Famous Italian nationalist Gabriele D'Annunzio supported the seizure of Dalmatia, and proceeded to Zadar in an Italian warship in December 1918. However, in spite of the guarantees of the Treaty of London to Italy of a large portion of Dalmatia and Italian military occupation of claimed territories of Dalmatia, during the peace settlement negotiations of 1919 to 1920, the Fourteen Points of Woodrow Wilson that advocated self-determination of nations took precedence, with Italy only being permitted to annex Zadar from Dalmatia, while the rest of Dalmatia was to be part of Yugoslavia.

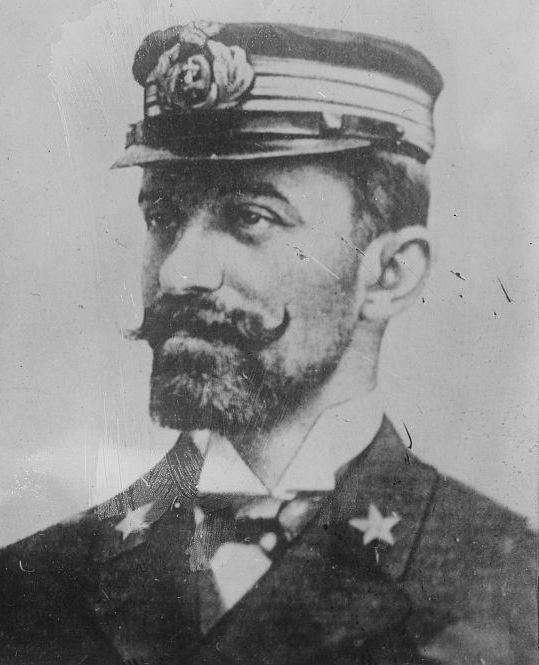
Enrico Millo, the first governor of the first Italian Governatorate of Dalmatia (1918–1920)

At the end of World War I, the Austrian Empire disintegrated, and Dalmatia was again split between the Kingdom of Serbs, Croats and Slovenes (later the Kingdom of Yugoslavia) which controlled most of it, and the Kingdom of Italy which held small portions of northern Dalmatia around Zadar and the islands of Cres, Lošinj, and Lastovo. Italy entered World War I in a territorial gamble, mostly to gain Dalmatia. But Italy got only a small part of its pretensions, so Dalmatia mostly stayed Yugoslav.

Despite the fact that there were only a few thousand Italian-speakers in Dalmatia after the constant decrease that occurred in previous decades, Italian irredentists continued to lay claim to all of Dalmatia. In 1927 Italy signed an agreement with the Croatian fascist, terrorist Ustaše organization. The Ustaše agreed that once they gained power, they will cede to Italy additional territory in Dalmatia and the Bay of Kotor, while renouncing all Croatian claims to Istria, Rijeka, Zadar and the Adriatic Islands.

Between 31 December 1910 and 1 December 1921, Istria lost 15.1% of its population. The last survey under the Austrian empire recorded 404,309 inhabitants, which dropped to 343,401 by the first Italian census after the war. While the decrease was certainly related to World War I and the changes in political administration, emigration also was a major factor. In the immediate post-World War I period, Istria saw an intense migration outflow. Pula, for example, was badly affected by the drastic dismantling of its massive Austrian military and bureaucratic apparatus of more than 20,000 soldiers and security forces, as well as the dismissal of the employees from its naval shipyard. A serious economic crisis in the rest of Italy forced thousands of Croat peasants to move to Yugoslavia, which became the main destination of the Istrian exodus.

In 1922, the territory of the former Kingdom of Dalmatia was divided into two provinces, the Oblast of Split and the Oblast of Dubrovnik. In 1929, the Littoral Banovina, a province of the Kingdom of Yugoslavia, was formed. Its capital was Split, and it included most of Dalmatia and parts of present-day Bosnia and Herzegovina. The southern parts of Dalmatia were in Zeta Banovina, from the Bay of Kotor to Pelješac peninsula including Dubrovnik. In 1939, Littoral Banovina was joined with Sava Banovina (and with smaller parts of other banovinas) to form a new province named the Banovina of Croatia. The same year, the ethnic Croatian areas of the Zeta Banovina from the Bay of Kotor to Pelješac, including Dubrovnik, were merged with a new Banovina of Croatia.

Due to a lack of reliable statistics, the true magnitude of Istrian emigration during that period cannot be assessed accurately. Estimates provided by varying sources with different research methods show that about 30,000 Istrians migrated between 1918 and 1921. Most of them were Austrians, Hungarians and Slavic citizens who used to work for the Austro-Hungarian Empire.

=== Slavs under Italian Fascist rule ===
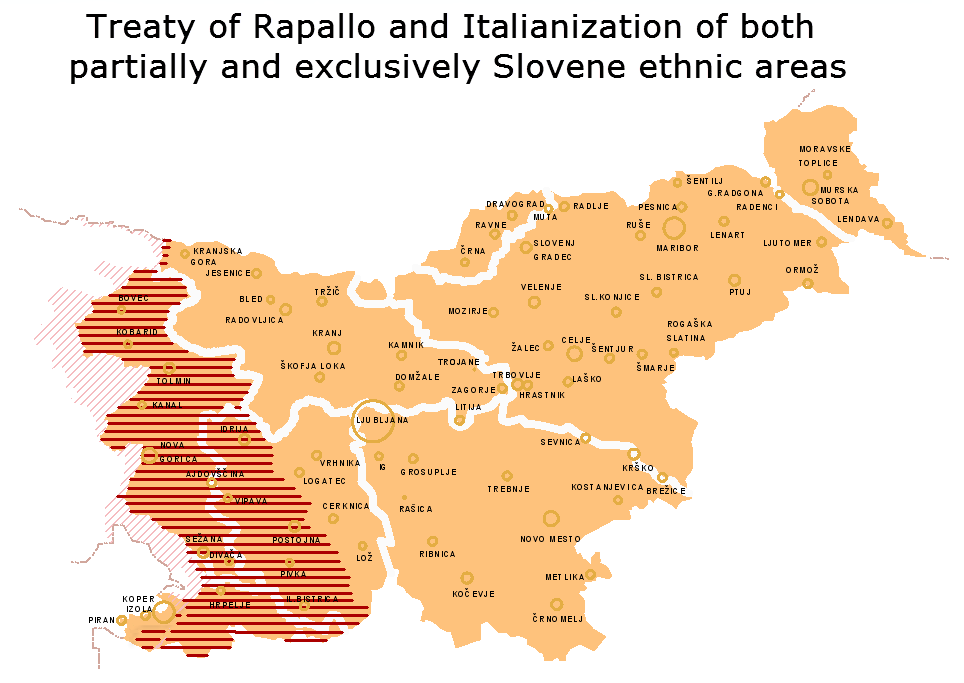
Outlined in red, the territory inhabited almost exclusively by Slovenes assigned to the Kingdom of Italy on the basis of the Treaty of Rapallo which was the subject of Italianization

After World War I, under the Treaty of Rapallo between the Kingdom of Serbs, Croats and Slovenes (later Kingdom of Yugoslavia) and the Kingdom of Italy (12 November 1920), Italy obtained almost all of Istria with Trieste, the exception being the island of Krk and part of Kastav commune, which went to the Kingdom of Serbs, Croats and Slovenes. By the Treaty of Rome (27 January 1924) Italy took Rijeka as well, which had been planned to become an independent state.

In these areas, there was a forced policy of Italianization of the population in the 1920s and 1930s. In addition, there were acts of fascist violence not hampered by the authorities, such as the torching of the Narodni dom (National House) in Pula and Trieste carried out at night by Fascists with the connivance of the police (13 July 1920). The situation deteriorated further after the annexation of the Julian March, especially after Benito Mussolini came to power (1922). In March 1923 the prefect of the Julian March prohibited the use of Croatian and Slovene in the administration, whilst their use in law courts was forbidden by Royal decree on 15 October 1925.

The activities of Croatian and Slovenian societies and associations (Sokol, reading rooms, etc.) had already been forbidden during the occupation, but specifically so later with the Law on Associations (1925), the Law on Public Demonstrations (1926) and the Law on Public Order (1926). All Slovenian and Croatian societies and sporting and cultural associations had to cease every activity in line with a decision of provincial fascist secretaries dated 12 June 1927. On a specific order from the prefect of Trieste on 19 November 1928 the Edinost political society was also dissolved. Croatian and Slovenian co-operatives in Istria, which at first were absorbed by the Pula or Trieste Savings Banks, were gradually liquidated.

At the same time, the Kingdom of Yugoslavia attempted a policy of forced Croatisation against the Italian minority in Dalmatia. The majority of the Italian Dalmatian minority decided to transfer in the Kingdom of Italy.

== Events ==
=== World War II ===
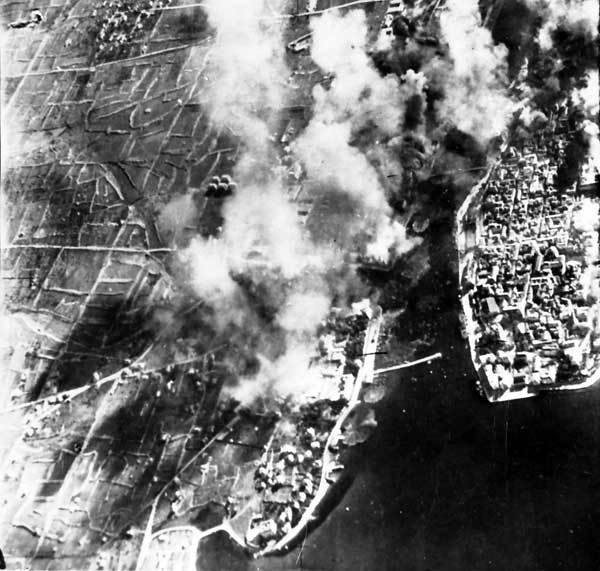
Bombing of Zadar in World War II by the Allies (1944): from these events began the exodus of the Dalmatian Italians from the city.

During World War II, in 1941, Nazi Germany, Fascist Italy, Hungary, and Bulgaria occupied Yugoslavia, redrawing their borders to include former parts of the Yugoslavian state. A new Nazi puppet state, the Independent State of Croatia (NDH), was created. With the Treaties of Rome, the NDH agreed to cede to Italy Dalmatian territory, creating the second Governorate of Dalmatia, from north of Zadar to south of Split, with inland areas, plus nearly all the Adriatic islands and Gorski Kotar. Italy then annexed these territories, while all the remainder of southern Croatia, including the entire coast, were placed under Italian occupation. Italy also appointed an Italian, Prince Aimone, Duke of Aosta, as king of Croatia.

Italy proceeded to Italianize the annexed areas of Dalmatia. Place names were Italianized, and Italian was made the official language in all schools, churches and government administration. All Croatian cultural societies were banned, while Italians took control of all key mineral, industrial and business establishments. Italian policies prompted resistance by Dalmatians, many joined the Partisans. This led to further Italian repressive measures – shooting of civilian hostages, burning of villages, confiscation of properties. Italians took many civilians to concentration camps – altogether, some 80,000 Dalmatians, 12% of the population, passed through Italian concentration camps.

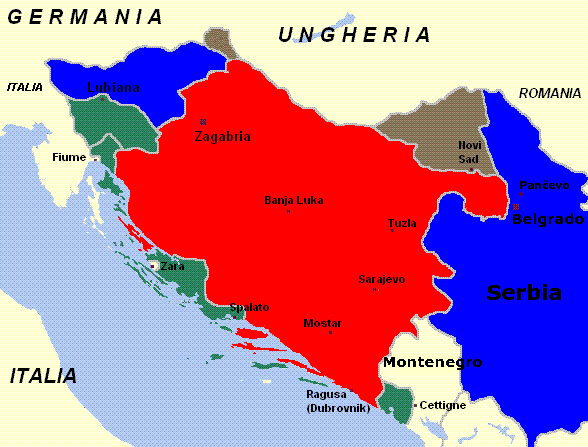
Division of Yugoslavia after its invasion by the Axis powers. Areas annexed by Italy: the area constituting the province of Ljubljana, the area merged with the province of Fiume and the areas making up the Governorate of Dalmatia Independent State of Croatia Area occupied by Nazi Germany Areas occupied by Kingdom of Hungary

Many Croats moved from the Italian-occupied area and took refuge in the satellite state of Croatia, which became the battleground for a guerrilla war between the Axis and the Yugoslav Partisans. Following the surrender of Italy in 1943, much of Italian-controlled Dalmatia was liberated by the Partisans, then taken over by German forces in a brutal campaign, who then returned control to the puppet Independent State of Croatia. Vis Island remained in Partisan hands, while Zadar, Rijeka, Istria, Cres, Lošinj, Lastovo and Palagruža became part of the German Operationszone Adriatisches Küstenland. The Partisans took Dalmatia in 1944, and with that Zadar, Rijeka, Istria, Cres, Lošinj, Lastovo and Palagruža became reunited with Croatia. After 1945, most of the remaining Dalmatian Italians fled the region (350,000 Italians escaped from Istria and Dalmatia in the Istrian-Dalmatian exodus). Currently there are only 300 Dalmatian Italians in the Croatian Dalmatia and 500 Dalmatian Italians in coastal Montenegro. After World War II, Dalmatia became part of the People's Republic of Croatia, part of the Federative People's Republic of Yugoslavia.

The territory of the former Kingdom of Dalmatia was divided between two federal republics of Yugoslavia and most of the territory went to Croatia, leaving only the Bay of Kotor to Montenegro. When Yugoslavia dissolved in 1991, those borders were retained and remain in force. During the Croatian War of Independence, most of Dalmatia was a battleground between the Government of Croatia and the Yugoslav People's Army (JNA), which aided the proto-state of Serbian Krajina, with much of the northern part of the region around Knin and the far south around, but not including, Dubrovnik being placed under the control of Serb forces. Croatia did regain the southern territories in 1992 but did not regain the north until Operation Storm in 1995. After the war, a number of towns and municipalities in the region were designated Areas of Special State Concern.

=== After armistice and after the end of the war ===
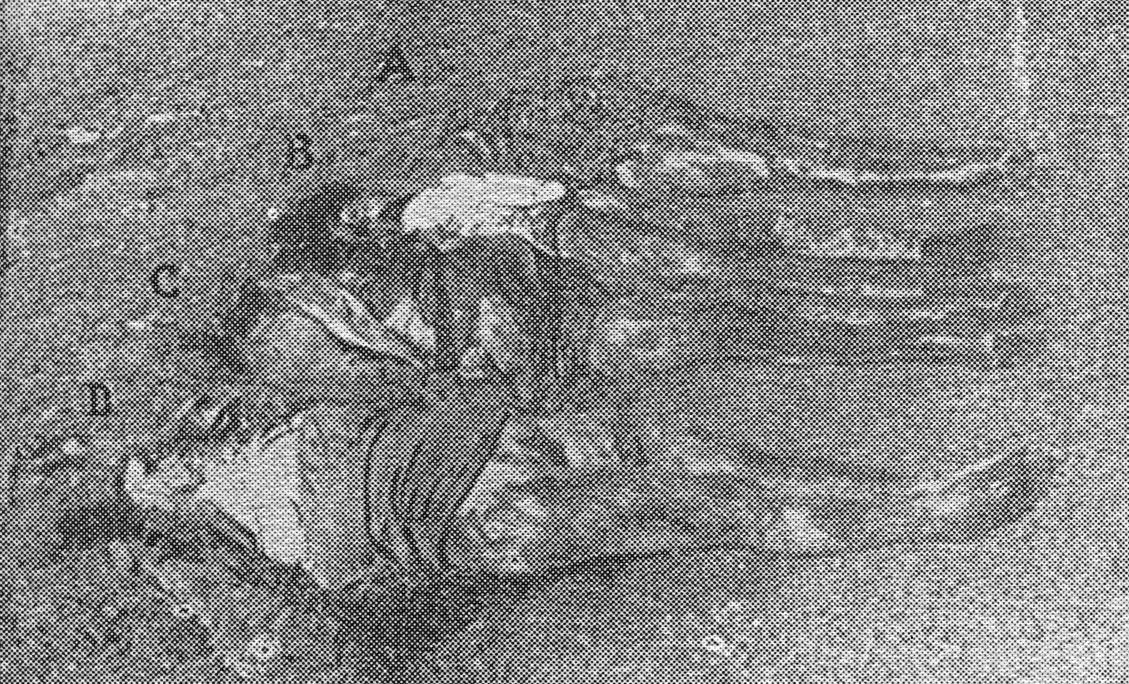
4 November 1943: next to the Foiba of Terli are decomposed corpses of Albina Radecchi (A), Catherine Radecchi (B), Fosca Radecchi (C) and Amalia Ardossi (D)

The massacres occurred in two waves, the first taking places in the interlude between the Armistice of Cassibile and the German occupation of Istria in September 1943, and the second after the Yugoslav occupation of the region in May 1945. Victims of the first wave numbered in the hundreds, whereas those of the second wave in the thousands. The first wave of killings is widely regarded as a disorganized, spontaneous series of revenge killings by Slovenes and Croats after twenty years of Fascist oppression, as well as "jacquerie" against Italian landowners and more broadly the Italian elite in the region; these killings targeted members of the Fascist Party, their relatives (as in the famous case of Norma Cossetto), Italian landowners, policemen and civil servants of all ranks, considered as symbols of Italian oppression. The scope and nature of the second wave is much more disputed; Slovene and Croat historians, as well as Italian historians such as Alessandra Kersevan and Claudia Cernigoi, characterize it as another wave of revenge killings against Fascist collaborators and members of the armed forces of the Italian Social Republic, whereas Italian historians such as Raoul Pupo, Gianni Oliva and Roberto Spazzali argue that this was the result of a deliberate Titoist policy aimed at spreading terror among the Italian population of the region and eliminating anyone who opposed Yugoslav plans of annexing Istria and the Julian March, including anti-Fascists. After the re-occupation of Istria by Axis forces in September 1943, following the first wave of killings, the fire brigade of Pola, under the command of Arnaldo Harzarich, recovered 204 bodies from the foibe of the region. Between 1945 and 1948, Italian authorities recovered a total 369 corpses from foibe in the Italian-controlled part of the Free Territory of Trieste (Zone A), and another 95 were recovered from mass graves in the same area; these included also bodies of German soldiers killed in the closing days of the war and hastily buried in these cavities. Foibe located in the Yugoslav-controlled part of the Free Territory of Trieste, as well as in the rest of Istria, were never searched as this territory was now under Yugolav control.

Great controversy has surrounded the foiba of Basovizza, one of the most famous foibe (and unlikely called as such, as it was not a natural foiba but a disused mine shaft). Newspaper reports from the postwar era claimed anywhere from 18 to 3,000 victims in this foiba alone, but Trieste authorities refused to fully excavate it, citing financial constraints. At the end of the war, local villagers had thrown the bodies of dead German soldiers (killed in a battle fought in the vicinity in the closing days of the war) and horses into the mine shaft, which after the war had also been used as a garbage dump by the authorities of the Free Territory of Trieste. After the war the Basovizza foibe was used by the Italian authorities as a garbage dump. Thus no Italian victims were ever recovered or determined at Basovizza. In 1959 the pit was sealed and a monument erected, which later became the central site for the annual foibe commemorations.

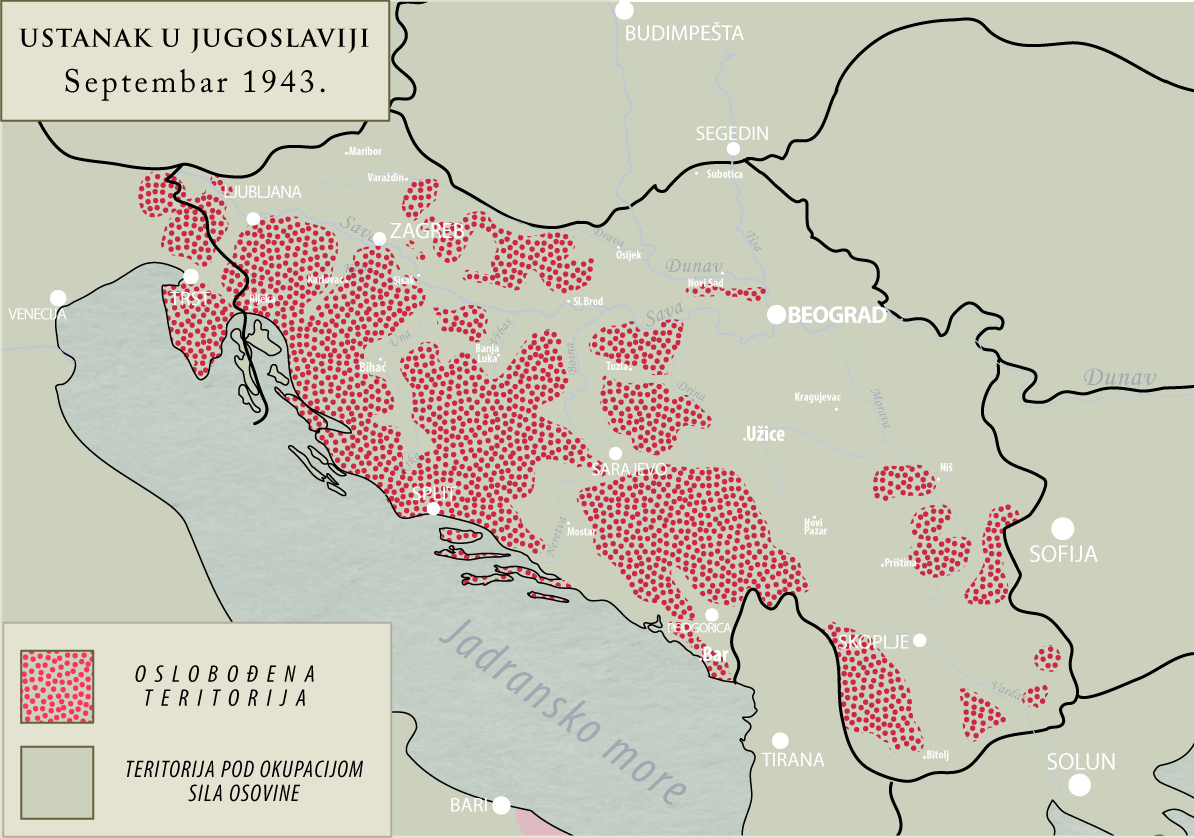
Area controlled by the Yugoslav Partisans (in red dots) immediately after the Badoglio Proclamation (8 September 1943)

At the Plutone foibe near Bazovizza, members of the Trieste Steffe criminal gang killed 18 people. For this the leader of the gang, Giovanni Steffe, and three others were arrested by the Yugoslav forces. Steffe and Carlo Mazzoni were killed by the Yugoslav forces while trying to escape. Three members of the gang, all from Trieste, were later convicted by Italian courts to 2 to 5 years in jail for the killings. Altogether some 70 trials were held in Italy from 1946 to 1949 for the killings, some ending in acquittals or amnesties, others with heavy sentences.

In 1947, British envoy W. J. Sullivan wrote of Italians arrested and deported by Yugoslav forces from around Trieste:

there is little doubt, while some of the persons deported may have been innocent, others were undoubtedly active fascists with more than mere party memberships on their conscience. Some of these have returned to Trieste but have kept well out of the Allied authorities, not participating in enquiries about the deportations for fear of arrest and trial 'for their former fascist activities'.

Alongside a large number of Fascists, however, among those killed were also anti-Fascists who opposed the Yugoslav annexation of the region, such as Socialist Licurgo Olivi and Action Party leader Augusto Sverzutti, members of the Committee of National Liberation of Gorizia; in Trieste, the same fate befell Resistance leaders Romano Meneghello (posthumously awarded a Silver Medal of Military Valor for his Resistance activities) and Carlo Dell'Antonio. In Fiume (where at least 652 Italians were killed or disappeared between 3 May 1945 and 31 December 1947, according to a joint Italian-Croat study), Autonomist Party leaders Mario Blasich, Joseph Sincich and Nevio Skull were among those executed by the Yugoslavs soon after the occupation, as was anti-Fascist and Dachau survivor Angelo Adam. Priests were also targeted by the new Yugoslav Communist authorities, as in the case of Francesco Bonifacio. Out of 1,048 people who were arrested and executed by the Yugoslavs in the province of Gorizia in May 1945, according to a list drafted by a joint Italian-Slovene commission in 2006, 470 were members of the military or police forces of the Italian Social Republic, 110 were Slovene civilians accused of collaborationism, and 320 were Italian civilians.

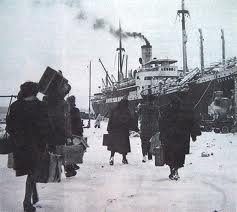
Istrian Italians leave Pola in 1947 during the Istrian-Dalmatian exodus

The foibe massacres ethnic cleansing, mass killings and deportations both during and immediately after World War II, mainly committed by Yugoslav Partisans and OZNA in the then-Italian territories (Note: Successively lost by Italy to Yugoslavia after the Treaty of Peace (1947).) of Julian March (Karst Region and Istria), Kvarner and Dalmatia, against local Italians (Istrian Italians and Dalmatian Italians) and Slavs, primarily members of fascist and collaborationist forces, and civilians opposed to the new Yugoslav authorities, and Italian, German, Croat and Slovene anti-communists against the regime of Josip Broz Tito, presumed to be associated with fascism, Nazism, collaboration with Axis and reventive purge of real, potential or presumed opponents of Titoism

The foibe massacres were followed by the Istrian–Dalmatian exodus, which was the post-World War II expulsion and departure of local ethnic Italians (Istrian Italians and Dalmatian Italians) from the Yugoslav territory of Istria, Kvarner, the Julian March, lost by Italy after the Treaty of Paris (1947), as well as Dalmatia, towards Italy, and in smaller numbers, towards the Americas, Australia and South Africa. According to various sources, the exodus is estimated to have amounted to between 230,000 and 350,000 Italians leaving the areas in the aftermath of the conflict. From 1947, after the war, Italians were subject by Yugoslav authorities to less violent forms of intimidation, such as nationalization, expropriation, and discriminatory taxation, which gave them little option other than emigration. According to the census organized in Croatia in 2001 and that organized in Slovenia in 2002, the Italians who remained in the former Yugoslavia amounted to 21,894 people (2,258 in Slovenia and 19,636 in Croatia).

== The remaining Italians ==
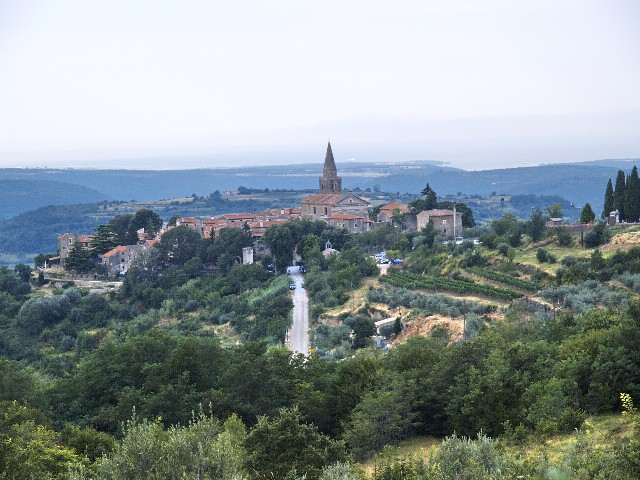
The village of Grožnjan/Grisignana is the only municipality in Croatia with a majority Italian speaking population.

According to the census organized in Croatia in 2001 and that organized in Slovenia in 2002, the Italians who remained in the former Yugoslavia amounted to 21,894 people (2,258 in Slovenia and 19,636 in Croatia). The number of speakers of Italian is larger if taking into account non-Italians who speak it as a second language.

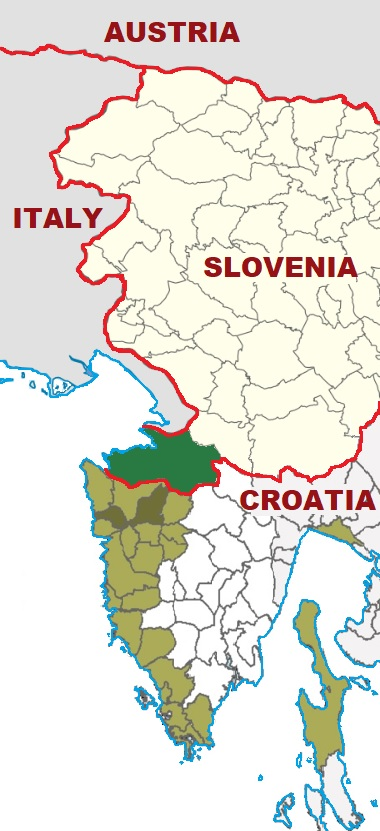
Settlement areas of the Italian national communities in Slovenia and Croatia: Settlement areas of the Italian national community in Slovenia Municipalities in Croatia where the Italian community exceeds 30% of the residents Municipalities in Croatia where the Italian community represents between 5% and 30% of the residents

In addition, since the dissolution of Yugoslavia, a significant portion of the population of Istria opted for a regional declaration in the census instead of a national one. As such, more people have Italian as a first language than those having declared Italian.

In 2001, about 500 Dalmatian Italians were counted in Dalmatia. In particular, according to the official Croatian census of 2011, there are 83 Dalmatian Italians in Split (equal to 0.05% of the total population), 16 in Šibenik (0.03%) and 27 in Dubrovnik (0.06%). According to the official Croatian census of 2021, there are 63 Dalmatian Italians in Zadar (equal to 0.09% of the total population). According to the official Montenegrin census of 2011, there are 31 Dalmatian Italians in Kotor (equal to 0.14% of the total population).

The number of people resident in Croatia declaring themselves Italian almost doubled between 1981 and 1991 censuses (i.e. before and after the dissolution of Yugoslavia). The daily newspaper La Voce del Popolo, the main newspaper for Italians of Croatia, is published in Rijeka/Fiume.

=== Official bilingualism ===
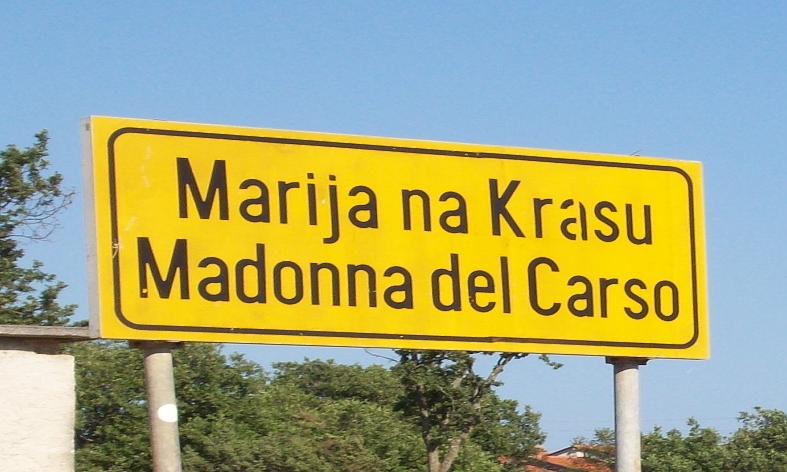
A bilingual road sign in Italian and in Croatian in Istria

Italian is co-official with Slovene in four municipalities in the Slovenian portion of Istria: Piran (Italian: Pirano), Koper (Italian: Capodistria), Izola (Italian: Isola d'Istria) and Ankaran (Italian: Ancarano). In many municipalities in the Croatian portion of Istria there are bilingual statutes, and Italian is considered a co-official language. The proposal to raise Italian to a co-official language, as in the Croatian portion of Istria, has been under discussion for years.

By recognizing and respecting its cultural and historical legacy, the City of Rijeka ensures the use of its language and writing to the Italian indigenous national minority in public affairs relating to the sphere of self-government of the City of Rijeka. The City of Fiume, within the scope of its possibilities, ensures and supports the educational and cultural activity of the members of the indigenous Italian minority and its institutions.

In various municipalities of Croatian Istria, census data shows that significant numbers of Italians still live in Istria, such as 51% of the population of Grožnjan/Grisignana, 37% at Brtonigla/Verteneglio, and nearly 30% in Buje/Buie. In the village there, it is an important section of the "Comunità degli Italiani" in Croatia. Italian is co-official with Croatian in nineteen municipalities in the Croatian portion of Istria: Buje (Italian: Buie), Novigrad (Italian: Cittanova), Izola (Italian: Isola d'Istria), Vodnjan (Italian: Dignano), Poreč (Italian: Parenzo), Pula (Italian: Pola), Rovinj (Italian: Rovigno), Umag (Italian: Umago), Bale (Italian: Valle d'Istria), Brtonigla (Italian: Verteneglio), Fažana (Italian: Fasana), Grožnjan (Italian: Grisignana), Kaštelir-Labinci (Italian: Castellier-Santa Domenica), Ližnjan (Italian: Lisignano), Motovun (Italian: Montona), Oprtalj (Italian: Portole), Višnjan (Italian: Visignano), Vižinada (Italian: Visinada) and Vrsar (Italian: Orsera).

=== Education and Italian ===
==== Slovenia ====
Beside Slovene-language schools, there are also preschools, primary schools, lower secondary schools, and upper secondary schools with Italian as the language of instruction in Koper/Capodistria, Izola/Isola and Piran/Pirano. At the state-owned University of Primorska, however, which is also established in the bilingual area, Slovene is the only language of instruction (although the official name of the university includes the Italian version, too).

==== Croatia ====
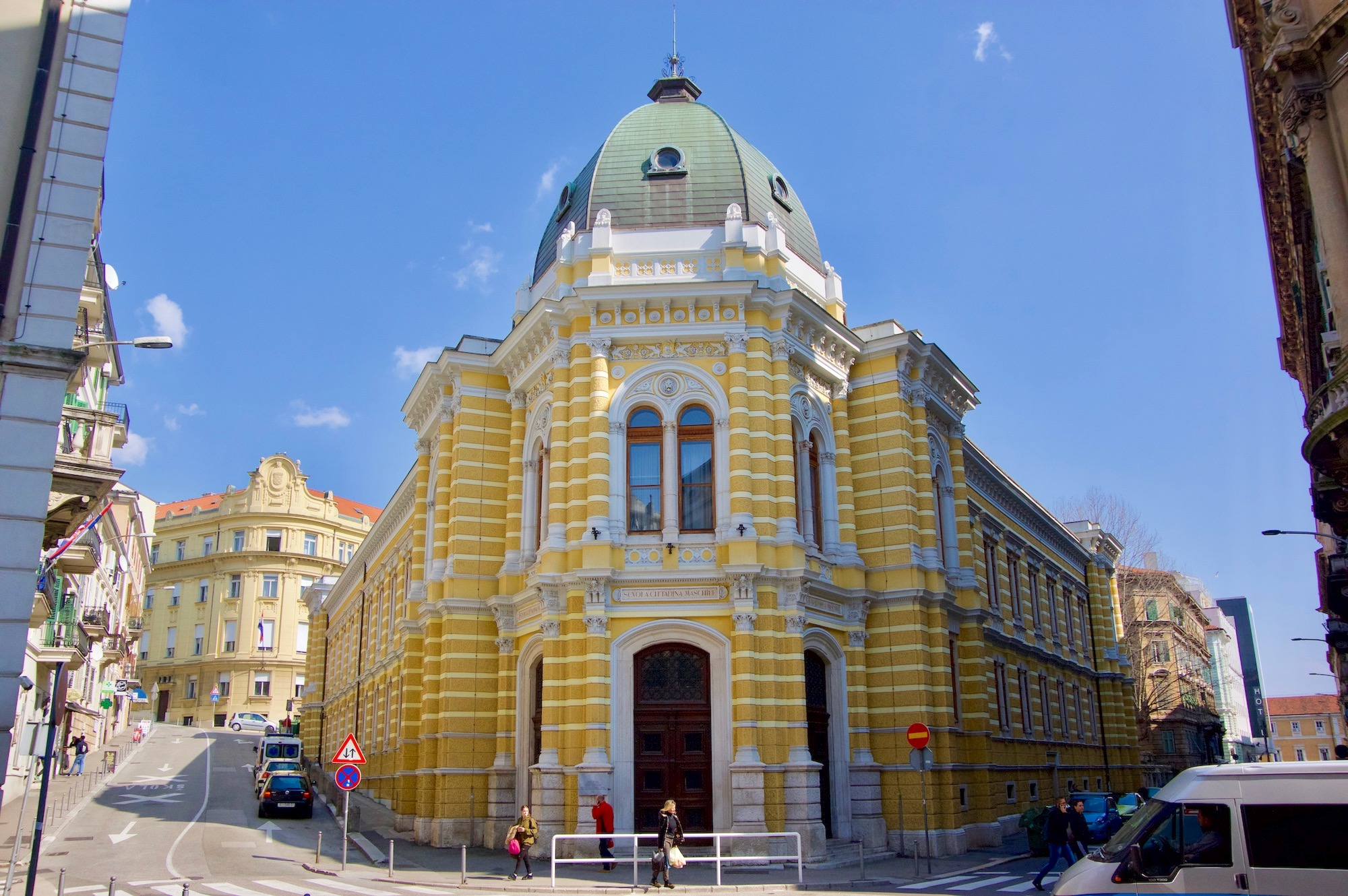
Italian Secondary School in Rijeka/Fiume

Beside Croatian-language schools, in Istria there are also preschools in Buje/Buie, Brtonigla/Verteneglio, Novigrad/Cittanova, Umag/Umago, Poreč/Parenzo, Vrsar/Orsera, Rovinj/Rovigno, Bale/Valle, Vodnjan/Dignano, Pula/Pola and Labin/Albona, as well as primary schools in Buje/Buie, Brtonigla/Verteneglio, Novigrad/Cittanova, Umag/Umago, Poreč/Parenzo, Vodnjan/Dignano, Rovinj/Rovigno, Bale/Valle and Pula/Pola, as well as lower secondary schools and upper secondary schools in Buje/Buie, Rovinj/Rovigno and Pula/Pola, all with Italian as the language of instruction.

The city of Rijeka/Fiume in the Kvarner/Carnaro region has Italian preschools and elementary schools, and there is an Italian Secondary School in Rijeka. The town of Mali Lošinj/Lussinpiccolo in the Kvarner/Carnaro region has an Italian preschool.

In Zadar, in Dalmatia/Dalmazia region, the local Community of Italians has requested the creation of an Italian preschool since 2009. After considerable government opposition, with the imposition of a national filter that imposed the obligation to possess Italian citizenship for registration, in the end in 2013, it was opened hosting the first 25 children. This preschool is the first Italian educational institution opened in Dalmatia after the closure of the last Italian school, which operated there until 1953.

Since 2017, a Croatian primary school has been offering the study of the Italian as a foreign language. Italian courses have also been activated in a secondary school and at the faculty of literature and philosophy.

== Number of victims ==
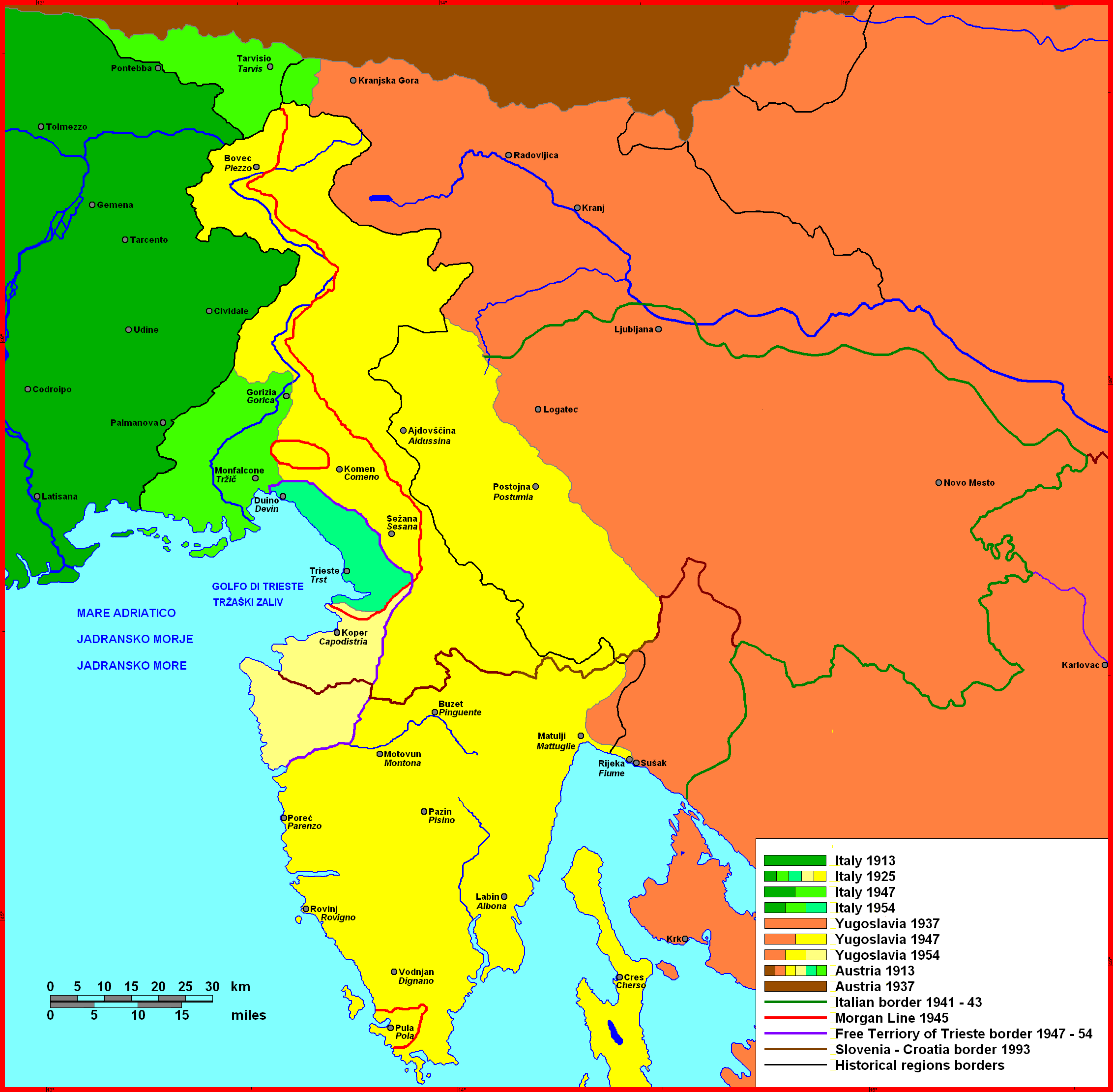
Changes to the Italian eastern border from 1920 to 1975. The Austrian Littoral, later renamed Julian March, which was assigned to Italy in 1920 with the Treaty of Rapallo (with adjustments of its border in 1924 after the Treaty of Rome) and which was then ceded to Yugoslavia in 1947 with the Treaty of Paris Areas annexed to Italy in 1920 and remained Italian even after 1947 Areas annexed to Italy in 1920, passed to the Free Territory of Trieste in 1947 with the Paris treaties and definitively assigned to Italy in 1975 with the Treaty of Osimo Areas annexed to Italy in 1920, passed to the Free Territory of Trieste in 1947 with the Paris treaties and definitively assigned to Yugoslavia in 1975 with the Osimo treaty

The number of those killed or left in foibe during and after the war is still unknown; it is difficult to establish and a matter of controversy. Estimates range from hundreds to twenty thousand. According to data gathered by a joint Slovene–Italian historical commission established in 1993, "the violence was further manifested in hundreds of summary executions—victims were mostly thrown into the Karst chasms (foibe)—and in the deportation of a great number of soldiers and civilians, who either wasted away or were killed during the deportation".

Historians Raoul Pupo and Roberto Spazzali have estimated the total number of victims at about 5,000, and note that the targets were not "Italians", but military and repressive forces of the Fascist regime, and civilians associated with the regime. More recently, Pupo has revised the total victims estimates to 3,000 to 4,000. Italian historian Guido Rumici estimated the number of Italians executed, or died in Yugoslav concentration camps, as between 6,000 and 11,000, while Mario Pacor estimated that after the armistice about 400 to 500 people were killed in the foibe and about 4,000 were deported, many of whom were later executed. Other sources claim 20,000 victims.

It was not possible to extract all the corpses from the foibe, some of which are deeper than several hundred meters; some sources are attempting to compile lists of locations and possible victim numbers. Between October and December 1943, the fire brigade of Pola, helped by mine workers, recovered a total of 159 victims of the first wave of mass killings from the foibe of Vines (84 bodies), Terli (26 bodies), Treghelizza (2 bodies), Pucicchi (11 bodies), Villa Surani (26 bodies), Cregli (8 bodies) and Carnizza d'Arsia (2 bodies); another 44 corpses were recovered in the same period from two bauxite mines in Lindaro and Villa Bassotti. More bodies were sighted, but not recovered.

The most famous Basovizza foiba, was investigated by English and American forces, starting immediately on 12 June 1945. After 5 months of investigation and digging, all they found in the foiba were the remains of 150 German soldiers and one civilian killed in the final battles for Basovizza on 29–30 April 1945. The Italian mayor, Gianni Bartoli continued with investigations and digging until 1954, with speleologists entering the cave multiple time, yet they found nothing. Between November 1945 and April 1948, firefighters, speleologists and policemen inspected foibe and mine shafts in the "Zone A" of the Free Territory of Trieste (mainly consisting in the surroundings of Trieste), where they recovered 369 corpses; another 95 were recovered from mass graves in the same area. At the time, no inspections were carried out either in the Yugoslav-controlled "Zone B", or in the rest of Istria.

Other foibe and mass graves were investigated in more recently in Istria and elsewhere in Slovenia and Croatia; for instance, human remains were discovered in the Idrijski Log foiba near Idrija, Slovenia, in 1998; four skeletons were found in the foiba of Plahuti near Opatija in 2002; in the same year, a mass grave containing the remains of 52 Italians and 15 Germans, most likely all military, was discovered in Slovenia, not far from Gorizia; in 2005, the remains of about 130 people killed between the 1940s and the 1950s were recovered from four foibe located in northeastern Istria.

== Investigations ==
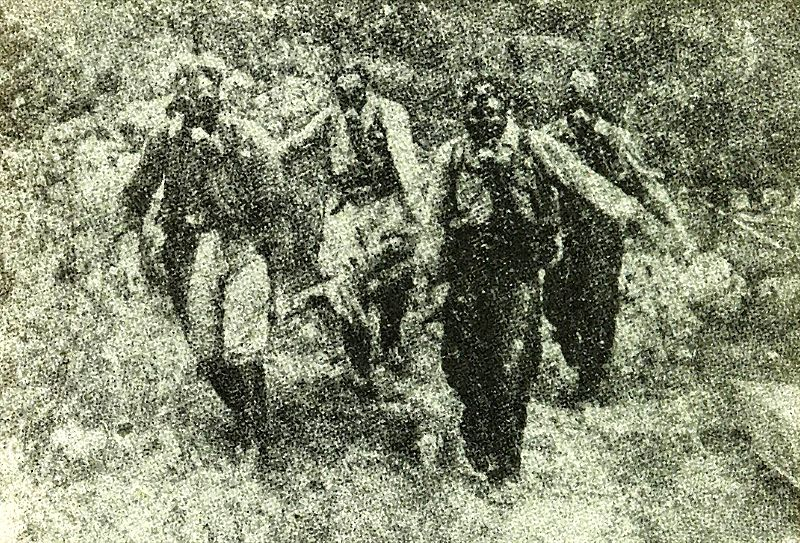
Recovery of a body from a foiba in Istria

After the war, inspector Umberto de Giorgi, who was State Police marshal under fascist and Nazi rule, led the Foibe Exploration Team. Between 1945 and 1948 they investigated 71 foibe locations on the Italian side of the border. 23 of these were empty, in the rest they discovered some 464 corpses. These included soldiers killed during the last battles of the war. Among the 246 identified corpses, more than 200 were military (German, Italian, other), and some 40 were civilians, of the latter, 30 killed after the war.

Due to claims of hundreds having been killed and tossed into the Basovizza mineshaft, in August–October 1945 British military authorities investigated the shaft, ultimately recovering 9 German soldiers, 1 civilian and a few horse cadavers. Based on these results the British suspended excavations. Afterwards the city of Trieste used the mineshaft as a garbage dump. Despite repeat demands from various right-wing groups to further excavate the shaft, the government of Trieste, led by the Christian Democratic mayor Gianni Bartoli, declined to do so, claiming among other reasons, lack of financial resources. In 1959 the shaft was sealed and a monument erected, thus becoming the center of the annual foibe commemorations.

Only a few trials were held, including that of the Trieste Zoll-Steffe criminal gang, for the killing of 18 people in the Plutone foibe in May 1945. Afterwards, Yugoslav authorities arrested the gang members and took them to Ljubljana, with two killed along the way while trying to escape, and the others convicted before a military tribunal. Additional members of the gang were brought before an Italian court in Trieste 1947, and were convicted and sentenced to prison for 2–3 years for their role in the Plutone killings.

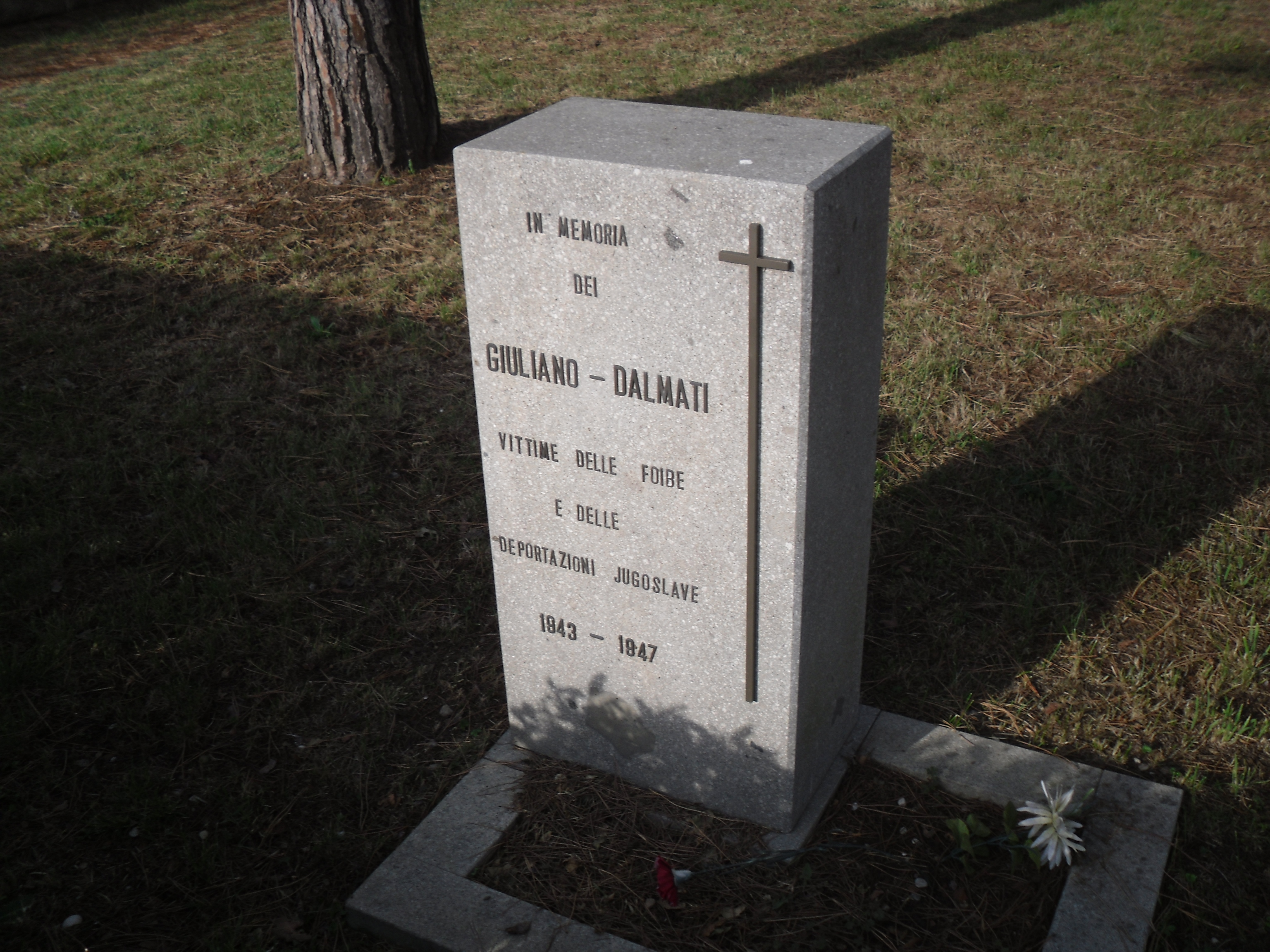
Memorial stone in memory of the Italian victims of Foibe and Yugoslav deportations, Padua.

In 1949 a trial was held in Trieste for those accused of killing Mario Fabian, a torturer in the "Collotti gang", a fascist squad that during the war killed and tortured Slovene and Italian antifascists, and Jews. Fabian was taken from his home on 4 May 1945, then shot and tossed into the Basovizza shaft. He is the only known Italian victim of Basovizza. His executioners were at first condemned, but later acquitted. The historian Pirjevec notes that the head of the gang, Gaetano Collotti, was awarded a medal by the Italian government in 1954, for fighting Slovene partisans in 1943, despite the fact that Collotti and his gang had committed many crimes while working for the Gestapo, and was killed by Italian partisans near Treviso in 1945.

In 1993 a study titled Pola Istria Fiume 1943–1945 by Gaetano La Perna provided a detailed list of the victims of Yugoslav occupation (in September–October 1943 and from 1944 to the very end of the Italian presence in its former provinces) in the area. La Perna gave a list of 6,335 names (2,493 military, 3,842 civilians). The author considered this list "not complete".

A 2002 joint report by Rome's Society of Fiuman studies (Società di Studi Fiumani) and Zagreb's Croatian Institute of History (Hrvatski institut za povijest) concluded that from Fiume and the surrounding area "no less than 500 persons of Italian nationality lost their lives between 3 May 1945 and 31 December 1947. To these we should add an unknown number of 'missing' (not less than a hundred) relegated into anonymity due to missing inventory in the Municipal Registries together with the relevant number of victims having ... Croatian nationality (who were often, at least between 1940 and 1943, Italian citizens) determined after the end of war by the Yugoslav communist regime."

In March 2006, the border municipality of Nova Gorica in Slovenia released a list of names of 1,048 citizens of the Italian city of Gorizia (the two cities belonged until the Treaty of Paris of 1947 to the same administrative body) who disappeared in May 1945 after being arrested by the Partisan 9th Corps. According to the Slovene government, "the list contains the names of persons arrested in May 1945 and whose destiny cannot be determined with certainty or whose death cannot be confirmed".

== Alleged motives ==
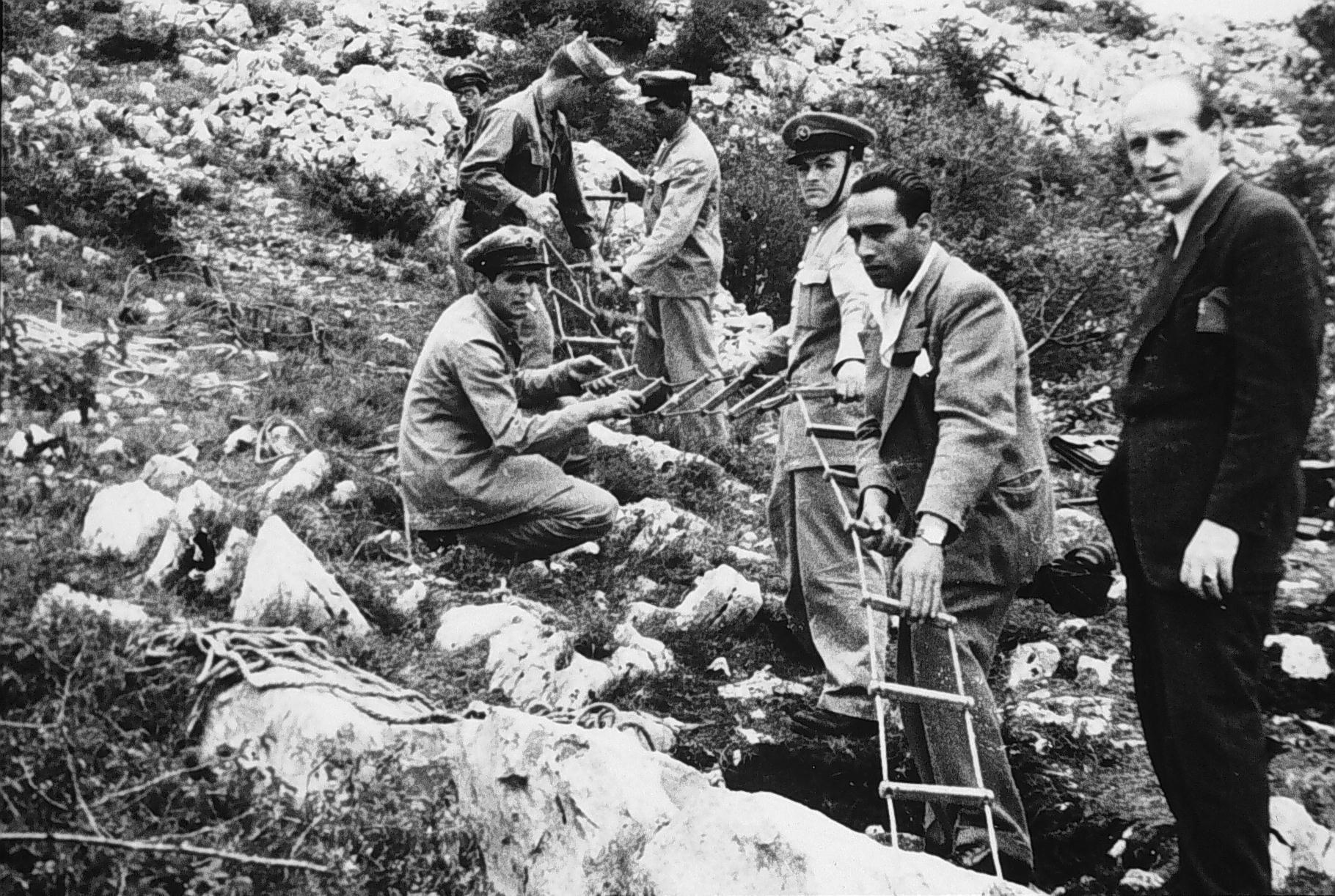
The discovery of the entrance to a mass grave in Friuli after World War II

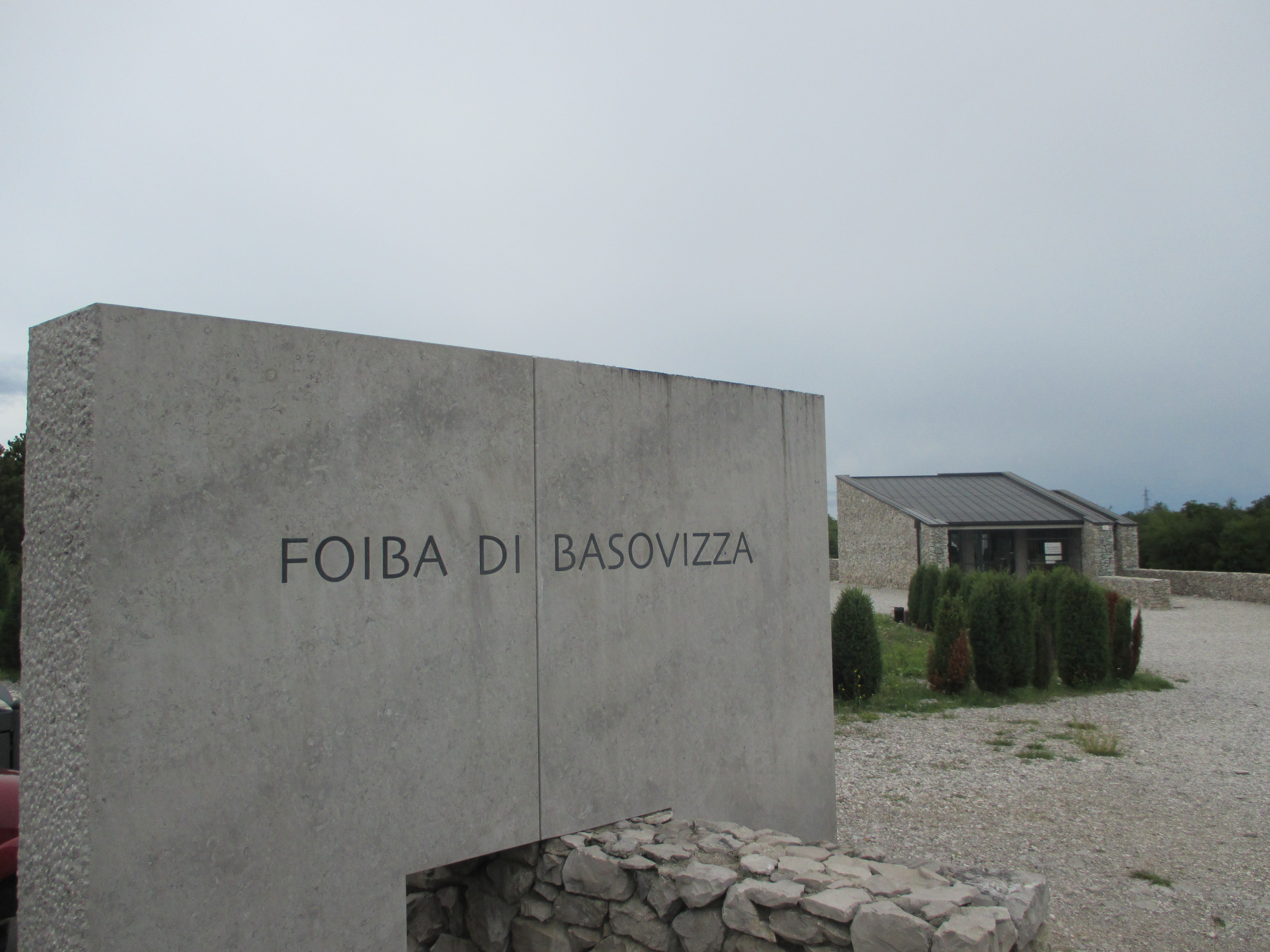
The foiba of Basovizza, near Trieste

It has been alleged that the killings were part of a purge aimed at eliminating potential enemies of communist Yugoslav rule, which would have included members of German and Italian fascist units, Italian officers and civil servants, parts of the Italian elite who opposed both communism and fascism (including the leadership of Italian anti-fascist partisan organizations and the leaders of Fiume's Autonomist Party, including Mario Blasich and Nevio Skull), Slovenian and Croatian anti-communists, collaborators, and radical nationalists.

Pupo claims that the primary targets of the purges were repressive forces of the Fascist regime, and civilians associated with the regime, including Slavic collaborators, thus:

With regard to the civilian population of Venezia Giulia the Yugoslav troops did not behave at all like an army occupying enemy territory: nothing in their actions recalls the indiscriminate violence of Red Army soldiers in Germany, on the contrary, their discipline seems in some ways superior even to that of the Anglo-American units. (Note: English: With regard to the civilian population of Venezia Giulia the Yugoslav troops did not behave at all like an army occupying enemy territory: nothing in their actions recalls the indiscriminate violence of Red Army soldiers in Germany, on the contrary, their discipline seems in some ways superior even to that of the Anglo-American units.)

Since Yugoslav troops did not behave like an occupying army, (Note: English: With regard to the civilian population of Venezia Giulia the Yugoslav troops did not behave at all like an army occupying enemy territory: nothing in their actions recalls the indiscriminate violence of Red Army soldiers in Germany, on the contrary, their discipline seems in some ways superior even to that of the Anglo-American units.) this partly contradicts the numerous academic authors and institutional figures — both in Italy and abroad — who recognized an ethnic cleansing against local Italians (Istrian Italians and Dalmatian Italians).

Another reason for the killings was retribution for the years of Italian repression, forced Italianization, suppression of Slavic sentiments and killings performed by Italian authorities during the war, not just in the concentration camps (such as Rab and Gonars), but also in reprisals often undertaken by the fascists.

According to Fogar and Miccoli there is

the need to put the episodes in 1943 and 1945 within [the context of] a longer history of abuse and violence, which began with Fascism and with its policy of oppression of the minority Slovenes and Croats and continued with the Italian aggression on Yugoslavia, which culminated with the horrors of the Nazi-Fascist repression against the Partisan movement. (Note: Italian: ... la necessità di inserire gli episodi del 1943 e del 1945 all'interno di una più lunga storia di sopraffazioni e di violenze, iniziata con il fascismo e con la sua politica di oppressione della minoranza slovena e croata proseguita con l'aggressione italiana alla Jugoslavia e culminata con gli orrori della repressione nazifascista contro il movimento partigiano.)

Gaia Baracetti notes that some representations of foibe, such as a miniseries on Italian television, are replete with historical inaccuracies and stereotypes, portraying Slavs as "merciless assassins", similar to fascist propaganda, while "largely ignoring the issue of Italian war crimes". Others, including members of Italy's Jewish community, have objected to Italian right-wing efforts to equate the foibe with the Holocaust, via historical distortions which include exaggerated foibe victim claims, in an attempt to turn Italy from a perpetrator in the Holocaust, to a victim. Other authors assert that the post-war pursuit of the 'truth' of the foibe, as a means of transcending Fascist/Anti-Fascist oppositions and promoting popular patriotism, has not been the preserve of right-wing or neo-Fascist groups. Evocations of the 'Slav other' and of the terrors of the foibe made by state institutions, academics, amateur historians, journalists, and the memorial landscape of everyday life were the backdrop to the post-war renegotiation of Italian national identity.

Pamela Ballinger in her book, History in Exile: Memory and Identity at the Borders of the Balkans, wrote:

I heard exiles' accounts of "Slavic barbarity" and "ethnic cleansing," suffered in Istria between 1943 and 1954, as well as Slovene and Croat narratives of the persecution experienced under the fascist state and at the hands of neofascists in the postwar period. Admittedly, I could not forget—as many exiles seemed to do—that the exodus from Istria followed on twenty years of the fascistization and Italianization of Istria, as well as a bloody Italian military campaign in Yugoslavia between 1941 and 1943. Nor could I countenance some exiles' frequent expressions of anti-Slav chauvinism. At the same time, however, I could not accept at face value the claim by some that the violence the Slavs suffered under fascism justified subsequent events in Istria or that all those who left Istria were compromised by fascism. Similarly, I came to reject the argument that ethno-national antagonism had not entered into the equation, as well as the counterview that the exodus represented simply an act of "ethnic cleansing".

An Italian-Slovene commission, namely the Slovenian-Italian historical-cultural commission (Slovene: Slovensko-italijanske zgodovinsko-kulturne komisije), wrote in its 2000 report that the Italian exodus had multiple causes.

The report by the mixed Italian-Slovenian commission describes the circumstances of the 1945 killings as follows:

14. These events were triggered by the atmosphere of settling accounts with the fascist violence; but, as it seems, they mostly proceeded from a preliminary plan which included several tendencies: endeavours to remove persons and structures who were in one way or another (regardless of their personal responsibility) linked with Fascism, with Nazi supremacy, with collaboration and with the Italian state, and endeavours to carry out preventive cleansing of real, potential or only alleged opponents of the communist regime, and the annexation of the Julian March to the new Yugoslavia. The initial impulse was instigated by the revolutionary movement which was changed into a political regime, and transformed the charge of national and ideological intolerance between the partisans into violence at national level.

Following the war the Yugoslav government pursued a policy of "Slav-Italian brotherhood" and Italian workers came to Yugoslavia to help with rebuilding. Relations worsened in 1948 when Yugoslavia broke with Stalin, while the Italian Communist Party supported the Soviet Union. Border disputes, postwar economic deprivations and the initial totalitarian nature of the Yugoslav government, made life difficult for all. All this led to what was until then a limited exodus, to much broader exodus following 1950. The commission was re-established in 2007 with the official name of Mixed Italian-Slovene Commission for the Maintenance of the State Border.

== Post-War ==
The foibe have been a neglected subject in mainstream political debate in Italy, Yugoslavia and former-Yugoslav nations, only recently garnering attention with the publication of several books and historical studies. It is thought that after World War II, while Yugoslav politicians rejected any alleged crime, Italian politicians wanted to direct the country's attention toward the future and away from the idea that Italy was, in fact, a defeated nation.

So, the Italian government tactically "exchanged" the impunity of the Italians accused by Yugoslavia for the renunciation to investigate the foibe massacres. Italy never extradited or prosecuted some 1,200 Italian Army officers, government officials or former Fascist Party members accused of war crimes by Yugoslavia, Ethiopia, Greece and other occupied countries and remitted to the United Nations War Crimes Commission. On the other hand, Belgrade did not insist overmuch on requesting the prosecution of alleged Italian war criminals.

== Re-emergence of the issue ==
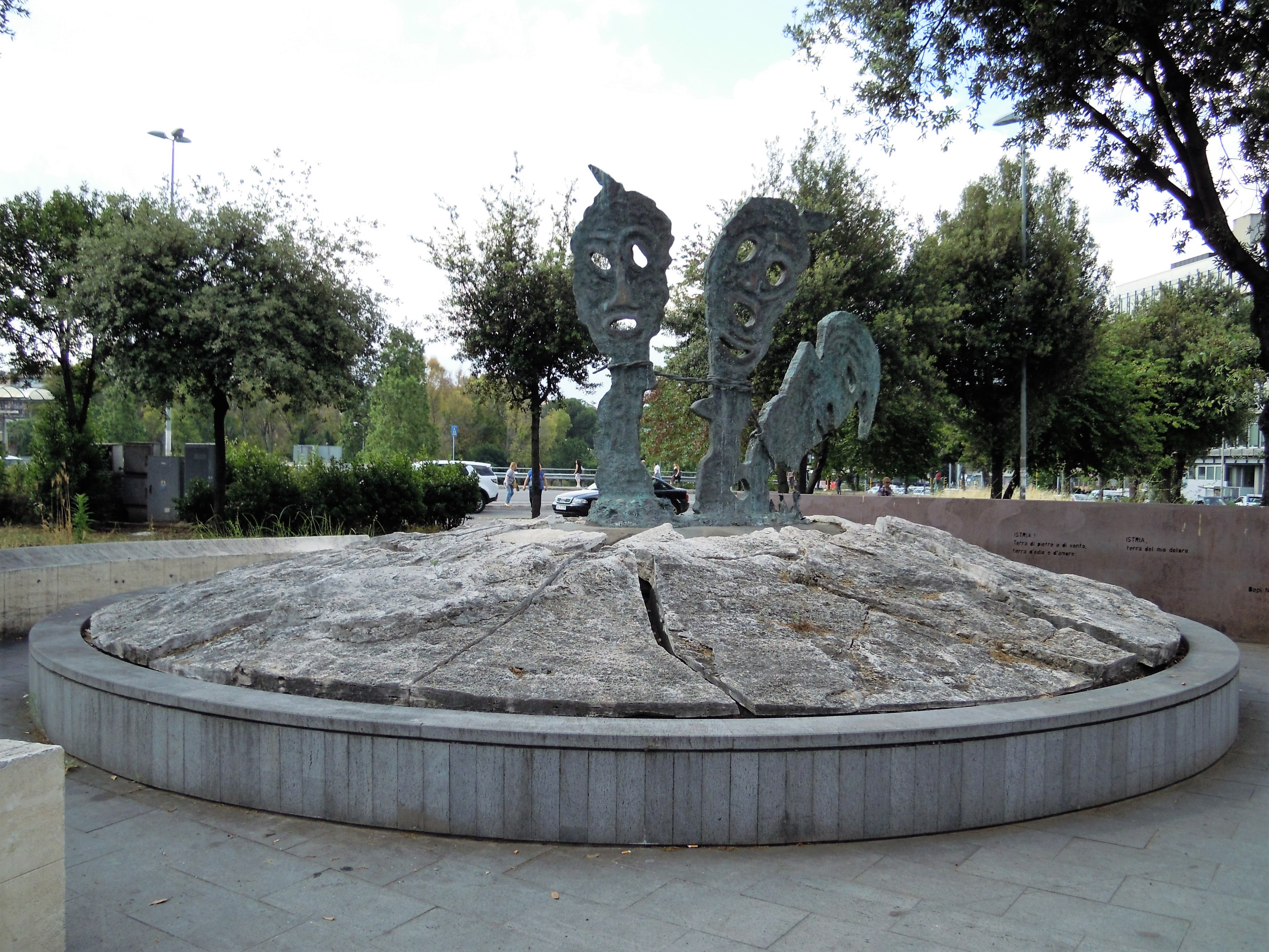
Rome, Giuliano-Dalmata district: monument to the victims of foibe

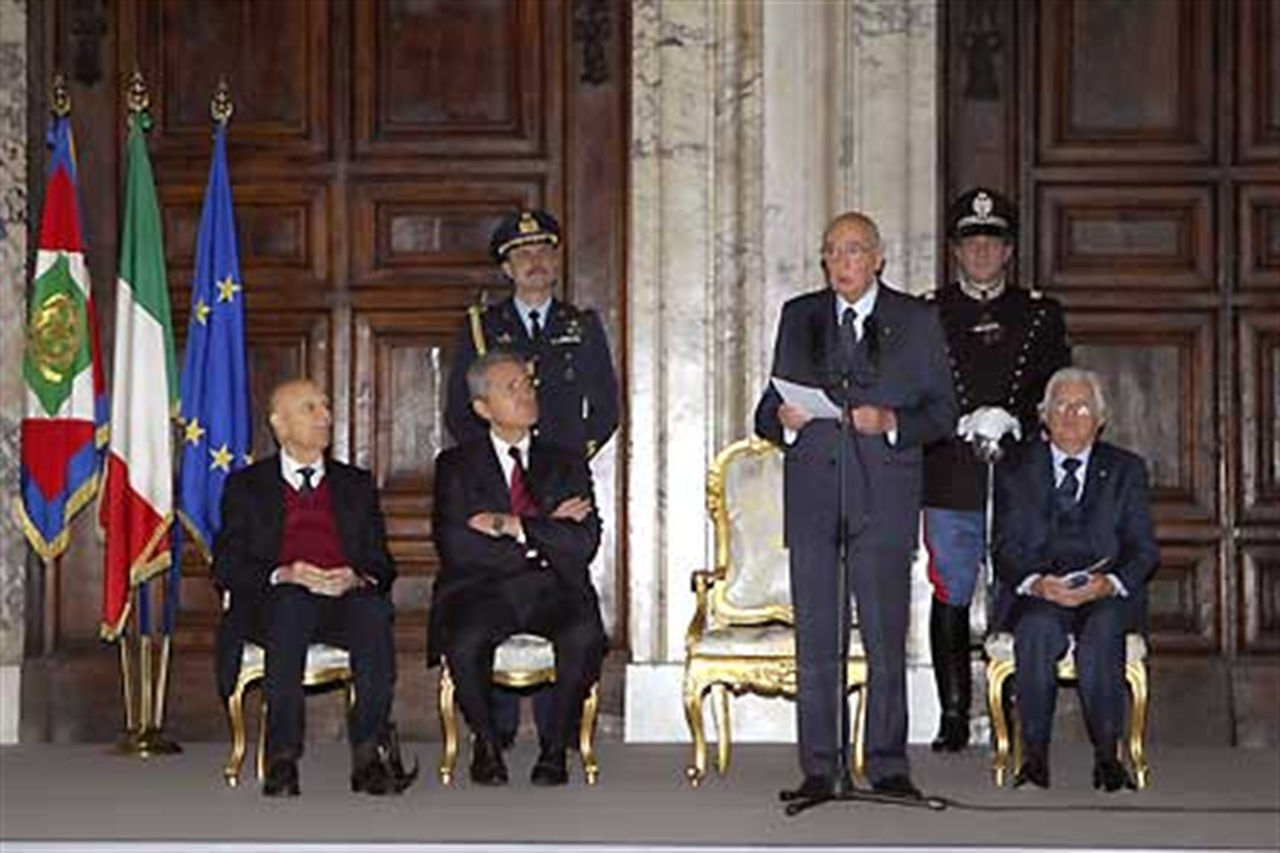
The President of the Italian Republic Giorgio Napolitano during his speech for the National Memorial Day of the Exiles and Foibe in 2007

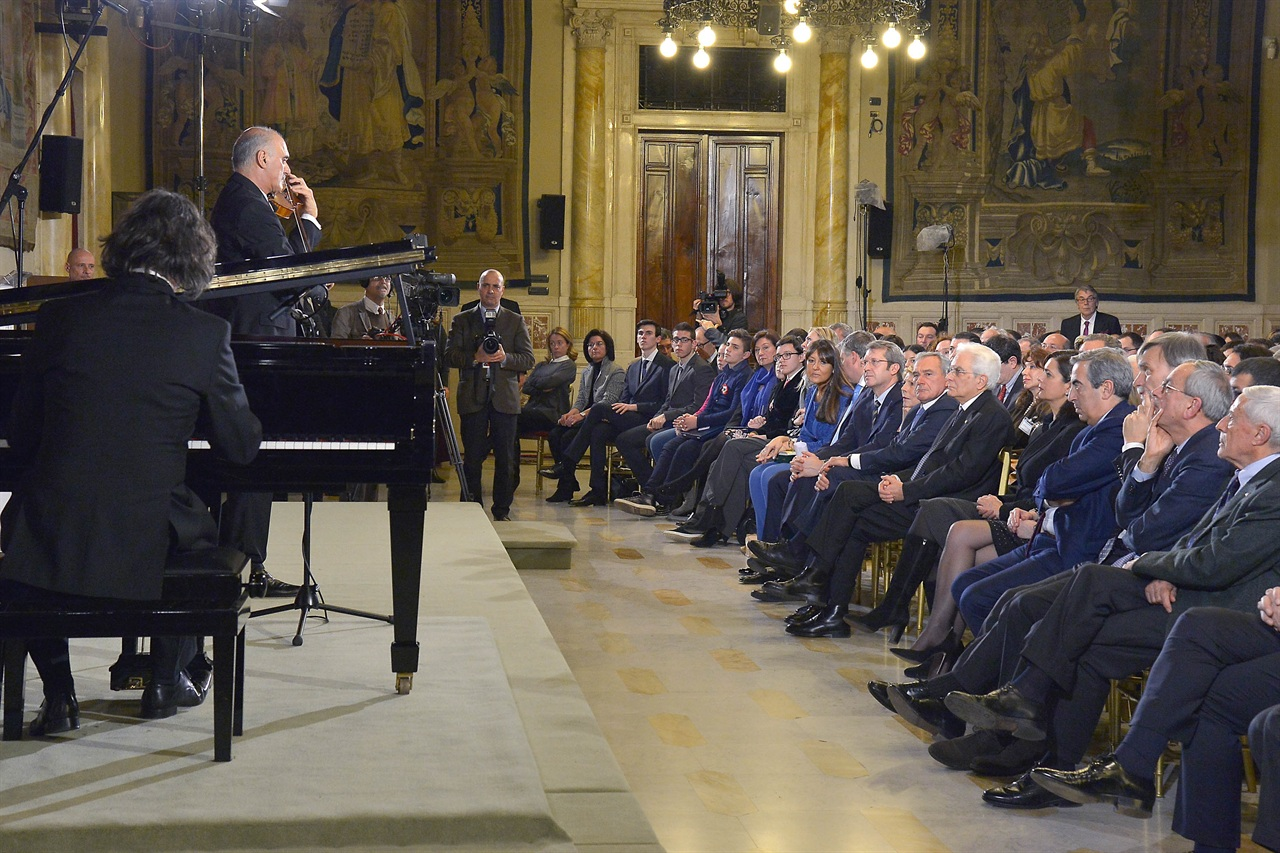
Concert at the Quirinal Palace in the presence of the President of the Italian Republic Sergio Mattarella on the occasion of the National Memorial Day of the Exiles and Foibe in 2015

These killings were the beginning of organized against local Italians (Istrian Italians and Dalmatian Italians). Silvio Berlusconi's coalition government brought the issue back into open discussion. The Italian Parliament (with the support of the vast majority of the represented parties) made 10 February National Memorial Day of the Exiles and Foibe, first celebrated in 2005 with exhibitions and observances throughout Italy (especially in Trieste). The occasion is held in memory of innocents killed and forced to leave their homes, with little support from their home country. In Carlo Azeglio Ciampi's words: "Time has come for thoughtful remembrance to take the place of bitter resentment." Moreover, for the first time, leaders from the Italian left, such as Walter Veltroni, visited the Basovizza foiba and admitted the culpability of the Left in covering up the subject for decades.

Nowadays, a large part of the Italian left acknowledges the nature of the foibe massacres, as attested by some declarations of Luigi Malabarba, senator for the Communist Refoundation Party, during the parliamentary debate on the institution of the National Memorial Day:

In 1945 there was a ruthless policy of exterminating opponents. Here, one must again recall Stalinism to understand what Tito's well-organized troops did. ... Yugoslav Communism had deeply assimilated a return to nationalism that was inherent to the idea of 'Socialism in One Country'. ... The war, which had begun as anti-fascist, became anti-German and anti-Italian.

Italian president Giorgio Napolitano took an official speech during celebration of the "Memorial Day of Foibe Massacres and Istrian-Dalmatian exodus" in which he stated:

... already in the unleashing of the first wave of blind and extreme violence in those lands, in the autumn of 1943, summary and tumultuous justicialism, nationalist paroxysm, social retaliation and a plan to eradicate Italian presence intertwined in what was, and ceased to be, the Julian March. There was therefore a movement of hate and bloodthirsty fury, and a Slavic annexationist design, which prevailed above all in the peace treaty of 1947, and assumed the sinister shape of "ethnic cleansing". What we can say for sure is that what was achieved – in the most evident way through the inhuman ferocity of the foibe – was one of the barbarities of the past century.

— Italian president Giorgio Napolitano, Rome, 10 February 2007

The Croatian President Stipe Mesić immediately responded in writing, stating that:

It was impossible not to see overt elements of racism, historical revisionism and a desire for political revenge in Napolitano's words. ... Modern Europe was built on foundations ... of which anti-fascism was one of the most important.

— Croatian president Stjepan Mesić, Zagreb, 11 February 2007.

The incident was resolved in a few days after diplomatic contacts between the two presidents at the Italian foreign ministry. On 14 February, the Office of the President of Croatia issued a press statement:

The Croatian representative was assured that president Napolitano's speech on the occasion of the remembrance day for Italian WWII victims was in no way intended to cause a controversy regarding Croatia, nor to question the 1947 peace treaties or the Osimo and Rome Accords, nor was it inspired by revanchism or historical revisionism. ... The explanations were accepted with understanding and they have contributed to overcoming misunderstandings caused by the speech.

— Press statement by the Office of the President of Croatia, Zagreb, 14 February 2007.

In Italy, Law 92 of 30 March 2004 declared 10 February as a Day of Remembrance dedicated to the memory of the victims of Foibe and the Istrian-Dalmatian exodus. The same law created a special medal to be awarded to relatives of the victims:

Medal of Day of Remembrance to relatives of victims of foibe killings

In February 2012, a photo of Italian troops killing Slovene civilians was shown on public Italian TV as if being the other way round. When historian Alessandra Kersevan, who was a guest, pointed out to the television host Bruno Vespa that the photo depicted the killings of some Slovenes rather than Italians, the host did not apologize. A diplomatic protest followed.

== In the media ==
- Il Cuore nel Pozzo, a 2005 TV movie focusing on the escape of a group of children from Tito's partisans.
- Red Land (Rosso Istria), a 2018 film directed by Maximiliano Hernando Bruno and starring Geraldine Chaplin, Sandra Ceccarelli, and Franco Nero.

Note: Many books have been written about the foibe, and results, interpretations and estimates of victims can in some cases vary largely according to the point of view of the author. Since most of the foibe currently lie outside Italian territory, no formal and complete investigation could be carried out during the years of the Cold War, and books could be of a speculative or anecdotal nature. For a complete list, see § Bibliography and § Further reading.

== See also ==
- Istrian-Dalmatian exodus
- National Memorial Day of the Exiles and Foibe
- World War II in Yugoslavia
  - List of mass executions and massacres in Yugoslavia during World War II
- Carso
- Norma Cossetto
- Francesco Bonifacio
- Mass killings under communist regimes

== Notes and references ==
=== Bibliography ===
- Baracetti, Gaia (2009). "Foibe: Nationalism, Revenge and Ideology in Venezia Giulia and Istria, 1943-5". Journal of Contemporary History. 44 (4): 657–674. doi:10.1177/0022009409339344. ISSN 0022-0094. JSTOR 40542981. S2CID 159919208.
- Bartoli, Matteo (1919). Le parlate italiane della Venezia Giulia e della Dalmazia (in Italian). Tipografia italo-orientale. p. 16.[ISBN unspecified]
- Bloxham, Donald; Dirk Moses, Anthony (2011). "Genocide and ethnic cleansing". In Bloxham, Donald; Gerwarth, Robert (eds.). Political Violence in Twentieth-Century Europe. Cambridge University Press. p. 125. doi:10.1017/CBO9780511793271.004. ISBN 9781107005037.
- Ferreto Clementi, Silvia. "La pulizia etnica e il manuale Cubrilovic". Foibe ed esodo: una storia negata a tre generazioni di italiani (PDF) (in Italian).
- Ivetic, Egidio (2022). Povijest Jadrana: More i njegove civilizacije [History of the Adriatic: A Sea and Its Civilization] (in Croatian and English). Srednja Europa, Polity Press. ISBN 9789538281747.
- Konrád, Ota; Barth, Boris; Mrňka, Jaromír, eds. (2021). Collective Identities and Post-War Violence in Europe, 1944–48. Springer International Publishing. p. 20. ISBN 9783030783860.
- Lowe, Keith (2012). Savage continent. London: Penguin UK. ISBN 9780241962220.
- Oliva, Gianni (2003). Foibe. Le stragi negate degli italiani della Venezia Giulia e dell'Istria [Foibe. The denied massacres of the Italians of Venezia Giulia and Istria] (in Italian). Oscar Mondadori. pp. 4–25–36–71–72–148. ISBN 88-04-51584-8.
- Peričić, Šime (19 September 2003). "O broju Talijana/talijanaša u Dalmaciji XIX. stoljeća" [About the number of Italians in Dalmatia, XIX century]. Radovi Zavoda za povijesne znanosti HAZU u Zadru (in Croatian). 45 (45): 327–355. ISSN 1330-0474.
- Petacco, Arrigo (1999). L'esodo: la tragedia negata degli italiani d'Istria, Dalmazia e Venezia Giulia (in Italian). Milano: Mondadori. ISBN 88-04-45897-6.
  - English edition: Petacco, Arrigo (2005). A tragedy revealed: the story of Italians of Istria, Dalmatia, and Venezia Giulia, 1943–1956. Translated by Eisenbichler, Konrad. University of Toronto Press. ISBN 0-8020-3921-9.
- Pizzi, Katia (1 February 2002). A City in Search of an Author. A&C Black. p. 91. ISBN 9780567244970.
- Pupo, Raoul; Spazzali, Roberto (2003). Foibe (in Italian). Bruno Mondadori. pp. 4–5–29–30–35–39–110–126–127–162–219–366. ISBN 88-424-9015-6.
- Pupo, Raoul (2005). Il lungo esodo. Istria: le persecuzioni, le foibe, l'esilio (in Italian). Rizzoli. ISBN 88-17-00562-2.
- Pupo, Raoul (April 1996). "Le foibe giuliane 1943-45". L'Impegno, A. XVI, N. 1 (in Italian). Istituto per la storia della Resistenza e della società contemporanea nel Biellese, nel Vercellese e in Valsesia. Archived from the original on 15 May 2021.
- Rumici, Guido (2002). Infoibati (1943–1945). I Nomi, I Luoghi, I Testimoni, I Documenti (in Italian). Ugo Mursia. ISBN 978-88-425-2999-6.
- Seton-Watson, Christopher (1967). Italy from Liberalism to Fascism, 1870–1925. Methuen. p. 107. ISBN 9780416189407.
- Tobagi, Benedetta (2014). "La Repubblica italiana". Treccani, il portale del sapere (in Italian). Treccani. Archived from the original on 14 June 2017.
- Tomasevich, Jozo (October 2002). War and Revolution in Yugoslavia, 1941–1945: Occupation and Collaboration. Stanford University Press. ISBN 978-0-8047-7924-1.
- (in English) Pamela Ballinger, History in Exile: Memory and Identity at the Borders of the Balkans, Princeton University Press, 2002, ISBN 0-691-08697-4.
- (in English) Benjamin David Lieberman, Terrible Fate: Ethnic Cleansing in the Making of Modern Europe, Ivan R. Dee, 2006 – Original from the University of Michigan 9 June 2008, ISBN 1-56663-646-9.
- (in English) Glenda Sluga, The Problem of Trieste and the Italo-Yugoslav Border: Difference, Identity, and Sovereignty in Twentieth-century Europe, SUNY Press, 2001 ISBN 0-7914-4823-1.
- (in Italian) Joze Pirjevec, Foibe: una storia d'Italia, Turin: Giulio Einaudi Editore, 2009, ISBN 978-88-06-19804-6.
- (in Italian) Gianni Bartoli, Il martirologio delle genti adriatiche
- (in Italian) Claudia Cernigoi, Operazione Foibe—Tra storia e mito, Kappa Vu, Udine, 2005, ISBN 978-88-89808-57-3. (The first edition of the book, published in 1997 as Operazione foibe a Trieste and limited in scope to the Trieste territory, is available online)
- (in Italian) Vincenzo Maria De Luca, Foibe. Una tragedia annunciata. Il lungo addio italiano alla Venezia Giulia, Settimo sigillo, Roma, 2000.
- (in Italian) Luigi Papo, L'Istria e le sue foibe, Settimo sigillo, Roma, 1999.
- (in Italian) Luigi Papo, L'ultima bandiera.
- (in Italian) Marco Pirina, Dalle foibe all'esodo 1943–1956.
- (in Italian) Franco Razzi, Lager e foibe in Slovenia.
- (in Italian) Giorgio Rustia, Contro operazione foibe a Trieste, 2000.
- (in Italian) Carlo Sgorlon, La foiba grande, Mondadori, 2005, ISBN 88-04-38002-0.
- (in Italian) Pol Vice, La foiba dei miracoli, Kappa Vu, Udine, 2008.
- (in Italian) Atti del convegno di Sesto San Giovanni 2008, "Foibe. Revisionismo di Stato e amnesie della Repubblica", Kappa Vu, Udine, 2008.
- (in Italian) Gaetano La Perna, Pola Istria Fiume 1943–1945, Mursia, Milan, 1993.
- (in Italian) Marco Girardo Sopravvissuti e dimenticati: il dramma delle foibe e l'esodo dei giuliano-dalmati Paoline, 2006.
- (in Italian and Croatian) Amleto Ballerini, Mihael Sobolevski, Le vittime di nazionalità italiana a Fiume e dintorni (1939–1947) – Žrtve talijanske nacionalnosti u Rijeci i okolici (1939.-1947.), Società Di Studi Fiumani – Hrvatski Institut Za Povijest, Roma Zagreb, Ministero per i beni e le attività culturali Direzione generale per gli archivi, Pubblicazioni degli Archivi Di Stato, Sussidi 12, ISBN 88-7125-239-X.

An Italian-Croatian joint research carried out by the Italian "Society of Fiuman studies" and the "Croatian Institute of History", containing an alphabetic list of recognized victims. As foot note, on each of the two lingual forewords, a warning states that Società di Studi Fiumani do not judge completed the present work, because the lack of funds, could not achieve to the finalization that was in intentions and goals of the initial project.
