= Gianni Oliva =

Italian historian and politician

- Born: 26 October 1952 (age 73); Turin
- Education: University of Udine
- Scientific career
- Fields: Modern history

Giovanni Oliva (short Gianni) is an Italian historian and politician from Turin.

Oliva specialises in Italian modern history, and in particular subjects related to the history of Italy during World War II.

He has written books about the Italian resistance movement, Italian war crimes, German and fascist war crimes in Italy during the period 1943 to 1945, the Italian Social Republic, the 1945 anti-fascist epuration, the foibe massacres and the Istrian–Dalmatian exodus.

Oliva has also been active in politics, and has held several public offices, first as a member of the Italian Communist Party, then of the Democratic Party of the Left.

== Publications ==
- 1989 – La Resistenza alle porte di Torino
- 1994 – I vinti e i liberati, Mondadori, Milan
- 1996 – I 600 giorni di Salò, Giunti
- 1997 – La Repubblica di Salò, Giunti
- 1998 – I Savoia, Mondadori, Milan
- 1999 – La resa dei conti, Mondadori, Milan
- 2000 – Umberto II, Mondadori, Milan
- 2001 – Storia degli Alpini, Mondadori, Milan
- 2002 – Foibe, Le stragi negate degli italiani della Venezia Giulia e dell'Istria, Mondadori, Milan
- 2002 – Storia dei Carabinieri, Mondadori, Milan
- 2003 – Duchi d'Aosta, Mondadori, Milan
- 2003 – La Resistenza, Giunti
- 2004 – Le tre italie del 1943, Mondadori, Milan
- 2005 – Profughi, Mondadori, Milan
- 2006 – «Si ammazza troppo poco». I crimini di guerra italiani 1940–43, Mondadori, Milan
- 2007 – L'ombra nera- le stragi nazifasciste che non ricordiamo più, Mondadori, Milan
- 2009 – Soldati e Ufficiali - L'esercito italiano dal Risorgimento a oggi, Mondadori, Milan
- 2011 – Esuli. Dalle foibe ai campi profughi: la tragedia degli italiani di Istria, Fiume, Dalmazia, Mondadori
- 2011 – Primavera 1945. Il sangue della guerra civile, Giunti
- 2012 – Un regno che è stato grande. La storia negata dei Borboni di Napoli e Sicilia, Mondadori, Milan
