= Mario Blasich =

Italian politician

Mario Blasich as a volunteer in the Royal Italian Army during the First World War

Mario Blasich (18 July 1878 – 3 May 1945) was an Italian politician and physician, and an important member of the Autonomist Party of Fiume, during the short-lived autonomy of the Free State of Fiume.

== Life ==
Blasich graduated in medicine and participated in politics alongside Riccardo Zanella, leader of the Fiuman Autonomist Party or Independent Party (as it was known to everyone in the city of Rijeka). In 1914, upon the outbreak of the First World War, Blasich was inducted into the Austro-Hungarian army alongside Zanella, and was sent to the Eastern Front. There he surrendered to the enemy, claiming to be an Italian irredentist and asked to be sent to Italy to join the Italian army. His request was granted and upon arrival in Italy, he enlisted with the rank of medical captain, fighting on the front line for the duration of the war. The Hungarian government, however, due to his initial surrender, condemned him to death for desertion.

At the end of the war in 1919, Blasich continued to work closely with Zanella and the Independent Party. Initially, he approved the companionship of Gabriele d'Annunzio; however, he later politically opposed the poet. After the Treaty of Rapallo on 12 November 1920, which established the Free State of Fiume in Rijeka, Blasich became the deputy to the Constituent Assembly and the Minister of the Interior of the Zanella Government, formed in October of that year.

On 3 March 1922, the Government of the Free State of Fiume was overthrown by a coup d'etat lasting 18 months by Italian fascists and ex-legionnaires with the active participation of 2000 armed Trieste Fascists (Trieste being annexed earlier by Italy in 1920) led by Francesco Giunta. Zanella and Blasich, as a result, were forced to flee to Yugoslavia. After the annexation of Fiume to Italy and the Treaty of Rome signed on 27 January 1924, almost all members of the Constituent Assembly in exile (except Zanella) returned to the city, and Blasich resumed his medical profession.

Blasich lost the use of his legs due to illness, following the armistice of 8 September 1943. He, along with other supporters of the movement such as Giuseppe Sincich, Leone Peteani, and Vittorio Sablich, was contacted by Yugoslav communist partisans, who saw them as the greatest obstacle to Yugoslav goals in Fiume, now that the Fascists were practically out of the picture. Blasich stated that he was willing to cooperate with the partisans in liberating the country from Axis occupation; however, Blasich refused to state publicly that he supported the annexation of the city to Yugoslavia, as was required by the emissaries of Josip Broz Tito.

== Death ==
In the night between 2 and 3 May 1945, while the last German troops abandoned the city that was captured by Yugoslav partisans, Blasich was killed in his home by Communist partisans. On 3 May 1945 and in the days immediately following his death, other separatist leaders, such as Giuseppe Sincich and Nevio Skull, were also murdered in the Fiume Autonomists purge.

== See also ==
- Titoism
- Free State of Fiume
- Charter of Carnaro
- Treaty of Rapallo (1920)
- Francesco Giunta
- Julian March
