= Fiume Autonomists purge =

The Fiume Autonomists purge, or the purge of the Autonomist elements of the city of Fiume, was a series of well orchestrated killings of the most prominent politicians and intellectuals of the Autonomist Party of Fiume or Rijeka (then still known with its historical name of Fiume).

== Historic overview ==
In the days leading to 3 May 1945 and the liberation of Rijeka from the Nazi occupation, the Yugoslav secret police OZNA began the liquidation of the more famous members of the Rijeka's Autonomist Party and the Liburnian Autonomist Movement who were lobbying for a status of independent territory for the city after the Second World War. Unlike the then Mayor of Rijeka, Riccardo Gigante and his associates, whom the new Yugoslav authorities could link to the Fascist regime and execute on 4 May 1945 without a trial near the Church on Kastav, the sympathisers of the autonomist ideas Fiume could hardly get any negative label sewed on to them. The Autonomists had been themselves victims of the previous fascist regime that had held power in town since the official annexation of the Free State of Fiume by Italy in 1924 and until the end of the Second World War. Moreover, these Autonomists had been in contact and actively cooperating with the Yugoslav partisans in the vicinity of the city, offering them concrete relief and support in liberating the city from the Nazi-fascist regime, but they were refusing to voice their support for the annexation of the city by the new communist Yugoslavia. They were also in contact with the Anglo-American part of the allied front, hoping for their intervention and future support for Fiume's independence. In March 1944, a group called 'Liburnists' proposed the re-establishment of the Free State of Fiume, but consisting of three cantons with its local languages: Italian in Fiume, Croatian in the Sušak area and Slovene in the Bistrica area.

In total, 650 people were killed after the entry of Yugoslav Army units into the city without any due trial. The first Autonomist personality to be killed was Giovanni Rubini (also known as Rubinich) killed on 21 April 1945 in front of the home threshold by a Yugoslav commando, being also one of the most active personalities in lobbying for the reactivation of Fiume's independence. The chief man of the autonomist movement in the city, Mario Blasich was strangled by a pillow. Seven people dressed in partisan uniforms went into the apartment and locked family members into the bathroom, and after the murder they searched the apartment and stole things in the amount of 30,000 liras. Giuseppe Sincich, a former member of the Constitutional Assembly of the Free State of Fiume, was arrested on the same night and killed in the morning. Nevio Skull disappeared, and after a few days he was found floating at the last bridge on the river Rječina and shot.

Apart from the elimination of the most exposed personalities of the movement, also between 1500 and 2000 sympathisers of the Autonomist cause were victim of politically motivated arrest.

Despite the enormous pressures, pro-autonomist candidates won in the first post-war elections for the suburban boards of the city. This motivated the occupational communist authorities, aware of the endeavour it would require to subjugate the local population to its totalitarian goals, to act swiftly and orchestrate a series of targeted actions and reprisals aimed at alienating the Italian-speaking population and pushing it into taking part in the larger Istrian-Dalmatian exodus. Between 1945 and 1954 Fiume lost 58,000 of the 66,000 inhabitants, mostly Italian-speakers (but also most other authoctonous nationalities like Hungarians, Slovenes, Croats, Austrians), previously residing within the city's borders, in order to avoid the growing discrimination, targeted violence and terrorist acts enacted by the local and national authorities against them. These crimes still fail to be officially recognised by Rijeka's authorities nowadays and are a source of continuous internal tensions between the population and the city's elites.

=== Major personalities killed in the purge ===
- Giovanni Rubinich
- Mario Blasich
- Giuseppe Sincich
- Nevio Skull
- Mario De Hajnal
- Radoslav Baucer
- Angelo Adam
- Vittorio Bunjevaz
