= Nevio Skull =

Fiuman Italian businessman and politician

- Born: 23 December 1903; Fiume, Hungary
- Died: 3–4 May 1945 (aged 41)
- Body discovered: 29 May 1945
- Occupations: Businessman and politician

Nevio Skull (23 December 1903 – 3–4 May 1945) was a Fiuman Italian businessman and politician from Rijeka (now Croatia). From his father, Skull inherited the property of the "Foundry and factory machines of Matthew Skull", founded in Rijeka in 1878 and quickly became the largest private industry in the city before being taken over in 1935. After 1943 Skull was approached by emissaries of the Yugoslav Partisans, who attempted to convince him to support the annexation of the city of Rijeka to the Democratic Federal Yugoslavia.

Skull rejected these proposals, and with the surrender of Italy in World War II, a group of citizens issued a Liburnia Memorandum in which it was recommended that an Italian confederate state be formed from the free cantons of Rijeka (Fiume), Sušak (Sussak) and Ilirska Bistrica (Bisterza), with a planned condominium with the islands of Krk (Veglia), Cres (Cherso) and Lošinj (Lussino).

== Death ==
On the night of 3–4 May 1945, following the Yugoslav occupation of Rijeka, Skull was arrested by agents of OZNA and disappeared as part of the Fiume Autonomists purge. His body was found on the riverbed of the Rječina 25 days later with a gunshot wound to the neck.

== See also ==
- Lists of solved missing person cases
- List of unsolved murders (1900–1979)

== Sources ==
- Le vittime di nazionalità italiana a Fiume e dintorni (1939–1947): Žrtve talijanske nacionalnosti u Rijeci i okolici (1939.–1947.). Ministero per i beni e le attività culturali, Direzione generale per gli archivi. 2002. p. 627.
- Samani, Salvatore (1975). Biographical Dictionary of Rijeka. Dolo-Venice: Institute Tipografico Editorial. p. 129.
