= Istrian–Dalmatian exodus =

Post-World War II exodus of ethnic Italians from Yugoslavia

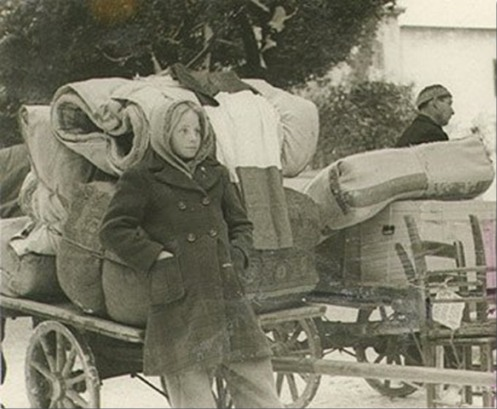
- A young Italian exile carries her personal effects and a flag of Italy in 1945
- Date: 1943–1960
- Location: Yugoslavia
- Cause: The Treaty of Peace with Italy, signed after the Second World War, assigned the former Italian territories of Istria, Kvarner, the Julian March, and Dalmatia to the nation of Yugoslavia
- Participants: Local ethnic Italians (Istrian Italians and Dalmatian Italians), as well as ethnic Slovenes and Croats who chose to maintain Italian citizenship.
- Outcome: Between 230,000 and 350,000 people emigrated from Yugoslavia to Italy and, in a smaller number, towards the Americas, Australia and South Africa.

The Istrian–Dalmatian exodus (Italian: esodo giuliano dalmata; Slovene: istrsko-dalmatinski eksodus; Croatian: istarsko-dalmatinski egzodus) was the post–World War II exodus and departure of local ethnic Italians (Istrian Italians and Dalmatian Italians) as well as ethnic Slovenes and Croats from Yugoslavia. The emigrants, who had lived in the now Yugoslav territories of the Julian March (Karst Region and Istria), Kvarner and Dalmatia, largely went to Italy, but some joined the Italian diaspora in the Americas, Australia and South Africa. These regions were ethnically mixed, with long-established historic Croatian, Italian, and Slovene communities. After World War I, the Kingdom of Italy annexed Istria, Kvarner, the Julian March and parts of Dalmatia including the city of Zadar. At the end of World War II, under the Allies' Treaty of Peace with Italy, the former Italian territories in Istria, Kvarner, the Julian March and Dalmatia were assigned to now Communist-helmed Federal Yugoslavia, except for the Province of Trieste. The former territories absorbed into Yugoslavia are part of present-day Croatia and Slovenia.

The treaty provided the right of option of nationality to people on both sides, who might have been required to emigrate from the territory if they opted to keep their nationality by jus sanguinis (right of blood). According to various sources, the exodus is estimated to have amounted to between 200,000 and 350,000 Italians (the others being ethnic Slovenes and Croats who chose to maintain Italian citizenship) leaving the areas in the aftermath of the conflict. The exodus started in 1943 under Nazi Germany and ended completely only in 1954. According to the census organized in Croatia in 2001 and that organized in Slovenia in 2002, the Italians who remained in the former Yugoslavia amounted to 21,894 people (2,258 in Slovenia and 19,636 in Croatia).

Hundreds up to tens of thousands of local ethnic Italians (Istrian Italians and Dalmatian Italians) were killed or summarily executed during World War II by Yugoslav Partisans and OZNA during the first years of the exodus, in what became known as the foibe massacres. From 1947, after the war, Istrian Italians and Dalmatian Italians were subject by Yugoslav authorities to less violent forms of intimidation, such as nationalization, expropriation, and discriminatory taxation, which gave them little option other than emigration. On the other hand, it is also true that there is no document that would confirm that the Yugoslav authorities carried out any measures of deliberate ethnic cleansing, and there are also sources that mention that the Yugoslav authorities prevented the emigration of Italians and other inhabitants of Yugoslavia. Moreover, among the emigrants were not only ethnic Italians but also other Slavs from Yugoslavia.

== Overview of the exodus ==
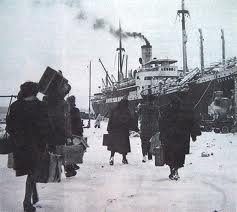
Istrian Italians leave Pola in 1947 during the Istrian-Dalmatian exodus.

A Romance-speaking population has existed in Istria since around the fall of the Western Roman Empire, when Istria was fully Latinised. The coastal cities especially had Italian populations, connected to other areas through trade, but the interior was mostly Slavic, especially Croatian.

Istrian Italians made up about a third of the population in Istria in 1900. According to the 1910 Austrian census, out of 404,309 inhabitants in Istria, 168,116 (41.6%) spoke Croatian, 147,416 (36.5%) spoke Italian, 55,365 (13.7%) spoke Slovene, 13,279 (3.3%) spoke German, 882 (0.2%) spoke Romanian (actually Istro-Romanian), 2,116 (0.5%) spoke other languages and 17,135 (4.2%) were non-citizens, who had not been asked for their language of communication. (Istria at the time included parts of the Karst and Liburnia). So, in the peninsula of Istria before World War I, local ethnic Italians accounted for about a third (36.5%) of the local inhabitants.

A new wave of Italians, who were not part of the indigenous Venetian-speaking Istrians, arrived between 1918 and 1943. At the time, Primorska and Istria, Rijeka, part of Dalmatia, and the islands of Cres, Lastovo, and Palagruža (and, from 1941 to 1943, Krk) were considered part of Italy. The Kingdom of Italy's 1936 census indicated approximately 230,000 people who listed Italian as their language of communication in what is now the territory of Slovenia and Croatia, then part of the Italian state (ca. 194,000 in today's Croatia and ca. 36,000 in today's Slovenia).

From the end of World War II until 1953, according to various data, between 200,000 and 350,000 people emigrated from these regions. Since the Italian population before World War II numbered 225,000 (150,000 in Istria and the rest in Fiume/Rijeka and Dalmatia), the remainder must have been Slovenes and Croats, if the total was 350,000. According to Matjaž Klemenčič, one-third were Slovenes and Croats who opposed the Communist government in Yugoslavia, but this is disputed. Two-thirds were local ethnic Italians, emigrants who were living permanently in this region on 10 June 1940 and who expressed their wish to obtain Italian citizenship and emigrate to Italy. In Yugoslavia they were called optanti (opting ones) and in Italy were known as esuli (exiles). The emigration of Italians reduced the total population of the region and altered its historical ethnic structure.

In 1953, there were 36,000 declared Italians in Yugoslavia, just 16% of the 225,000 Italians before World War II.

== History ==
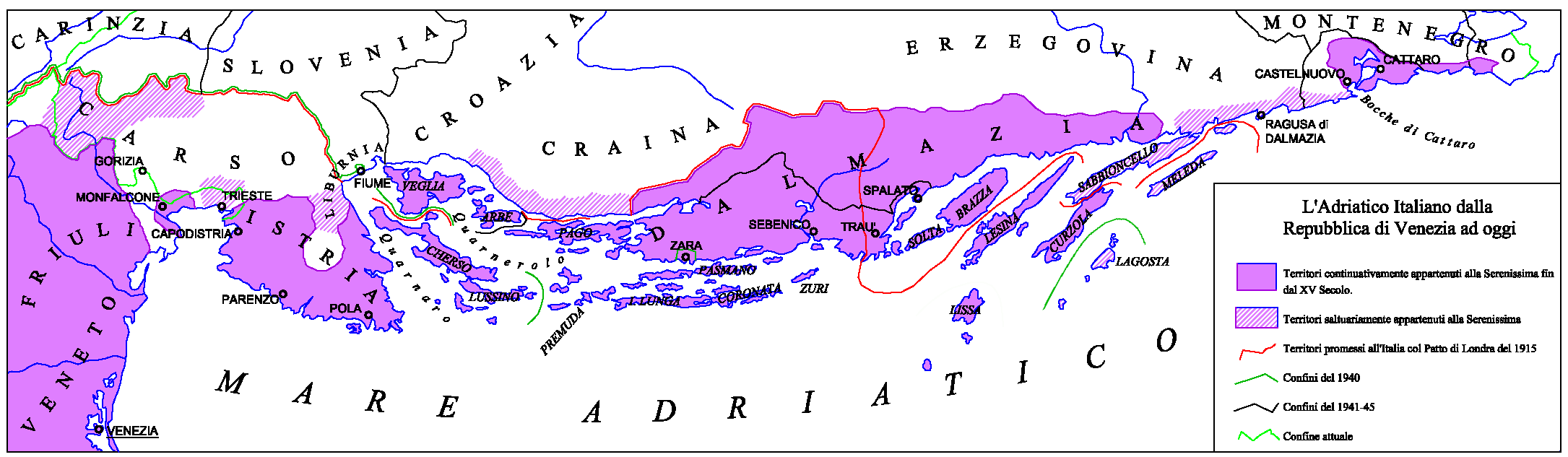
Map of Dalmatia and Istria with the boundaries set by the Treaty of London (1915) (red line) and those actually obtained from Italy (green line). The black line marks the border of the Governorate of Dalmatia (1941–1943). The ancient domains of the Republic of Venice are indicated in fuchsia (dashed diagonally, the territories that belonged occasionally).

=== From Roman era to early history ===
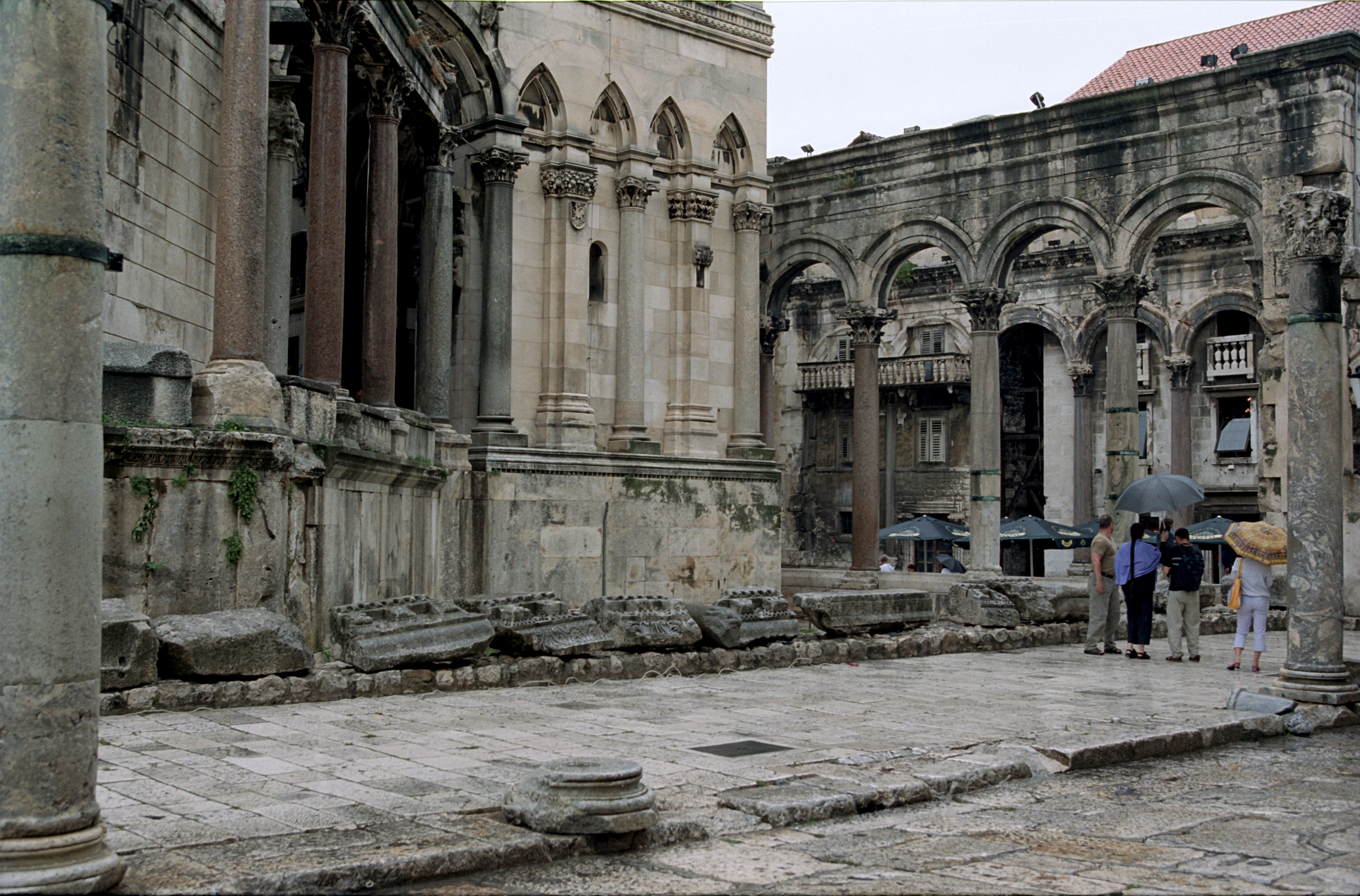
Palace of the Roman Emperor Diocletian, Split

Roman Dalmatia was fully Latinized by 476 AD when the Western Roman Empire disappeared. In the Early Middle Ages, the territory of the Byzantine province of Dalmatia reached in the North up to the river Sava, and was part of the Praetorian prefecture of Illyricum. In the middle of the 6th and the beginning of the 7th century began the Slavic migrations to the Balkans, which caused the Romance-speaking population, descendants of Romans and Illyrians (speaking Dalmatian), to flee to the coast and islands. The hinterland, semi-depopulated by the Barbarian Invasions, Slavic tribes settled. The Dalmatian cities retained their Romanic culture and language in cities such as Zadar, Split and Dubrovnik. Their own Vulgar Latin, developed into Dalmatian, a now extinct Romance language. These coastal cities (politically part of the Byzantine Empire) maintained political, cultural and economic links with Italy, through the Adriatic Sea. On the other side communications with the mainland were difficult because of the Dinaric Alps. Due to the sharp orography of Dalmatia, even communications between the different Dalmatian cities, occurred mainly through the sea. This helped Dalmatian cities to develop a unique Romance culture, despite the mostly Slavicized mainland.

Historian Theodor Mommsen wrote that Istria (included in the Regio X Venetia et Histria of Roman Italy since Augustus) was fully romanized in the 5th century AD. Between 500 and 700 AD, Slavs settled in Southeastern Europe (Eastern Adriatic), and their number ever increased, and with the Ottoman invasion Slavs were pushed from the south and east. This led to Italic people becoming ever more confined to urban areas, while some areas of the countryside were populated by Slavs, with exceptions in western and southern Istria which remained fully Romance-speaking.

By the 11th century, most of the interior mountainous areas of northern and eastern Istria (Liburnia) were inhabited by South Slavs, while the Romance population continued to prevail in the south and west of the peninsula. Linguistically, the Romance inhabitants of Istria were most probably divided into two main linguistic groups: in the north-west, the speakers of a Rhaeto-Romance language similar to Ladin and Friulian prevailed, while in the south, the natives most probably spoke a variant of the Dalmatian language. One modern claim suggests the original language of the romanized Istrians survived the invasions, this being the Istriot language which was spoken by some near Pula.

Via conquests, the Republic of Venice, between the 9th century and 1797, extended its dominion to coastal parts of Istria and Dalmatia. Thus Venice invaded and attacked Zadar multiple times, especially devastating the city in 1202 when Venice used the crusaders, on their Fourth Crusade, to lay siege, then ransack, demolish and rob the city, the population fleeing into countryside. Pope Innocent III excommunicated the Venetians and crusaders for attacking a Catholic city. The Venetians used the same Crusade to attack the Dubrovnik Republic, and force it to pay tribute, then continued to sack Christian Orthodox Constantinople where they looted, terrorized, and vandalized the city, killing 2.000 civilians, raping nuns and destroying Christian Churches, with Venice receiving a big portion of the plundered treasures.

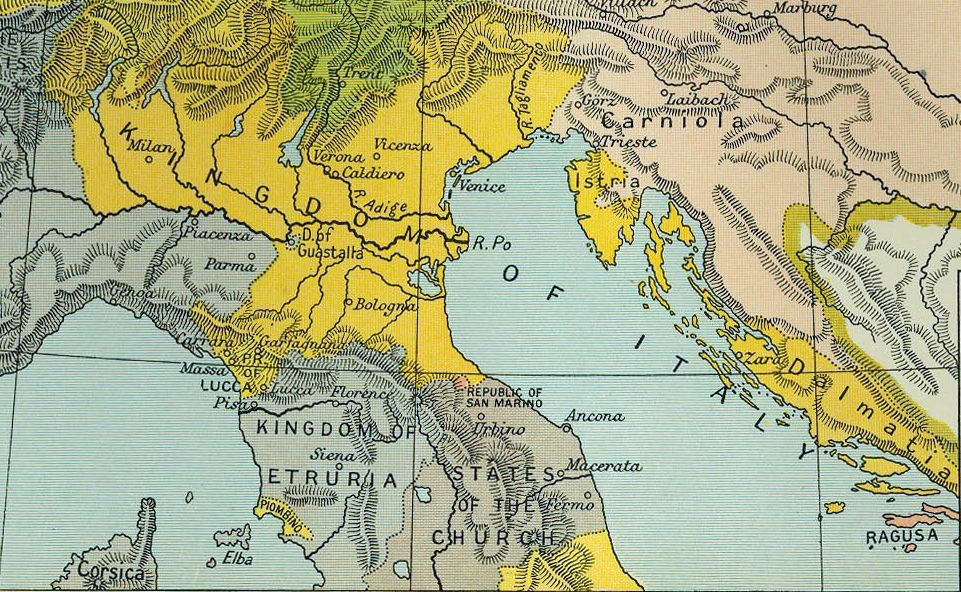
The Napoleonic Kingdom of Italy from 1806 to 1810 included Istria and Dalmatia that had belonged to the Republic of Venice until 1797.

The coastal areas and cities of Istria came under Venetian Influence in the 9th century. In 1145, the cities of Pula, Koper and Izola rose against the Republic of Venice but were defeated, and were since further controlled by Venice. On 15 February 1267, Poreč was formally incorporated with the Venetian state. Other coastal towns followed shortly thereafter. The Republic of Venice gradually dominated the whole coastal area of western Istria and the area to Plomin on the eastern part of the peninsula. Dalmatia was first and finally sold to the Republic of Venice in 1409 but Venetian Dalmatia was not fully consolidated from 1420.

From the Middle Ages onwards, numbers of Slavic people near and on the Adriatic coast were ever increasing, due to their expanding population and due to pressure from the Ottomans pushing them from the south and east. This led to Italic people becoming ever more confined to urban areas, while the countryside was populated by Slavs, with certain isolated exceptions. In particular, the population was divided into urban-coastal communities (mainly Romance-speakers) and rural communities (mainly Slavic-speakers), with small minorities of Morlachs and Istro-Romanians.

Republic of Venice influenced the neolatins of Istria and Dalmatia until 1797, when it was conquered by Napoleon: Capodistria and Pola were important centers of art and culture during the Italian Renaissance. Istria and Dalmatia were then aggregated to the Napoleonic Kingdom of Italy in 1805, and annexed to the Illyrian Provinces in 1809 (for some years also the Republic of Ragusa was included, since 1808). From the Middle Ages to the 19th century, Italian and Slavic communities in Istria and Dalmatia had lived peacefully side by side because they did not know the national identification, given that they generically defined themselves as "Istrians" and "Dalmatians", of "Romance" or "Slavic" culture.

=== Austrian Empire ===
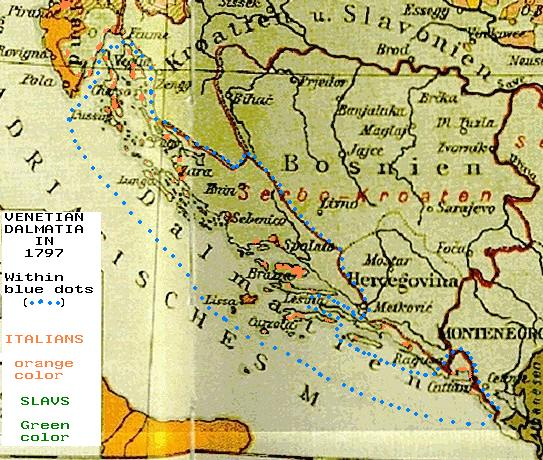
Austrian linguistic map from 1896. In green the areas where Slavs were the majority of the population, in orange the areas where Istrian Italians and Dalmatian Italians were the majority of the population. The boundaries of Venetian Dalmatia in 1797 are delimited with blue dots.

After the fall of Napoleon (1814), Istria, Kvarner and Dalmatia were annexed to the Austrian Empire. Many Istrian Italians and Dalmatian Italians looked with sympathy towards the Risorgimento movement that fought for the unification of Italy. However, after the Third Italian War of Independence (1866), when the Veneto and Friuli regions were ceded by the Austrians to the newly formed Kingdom Italy, Istria and Dalmatia remained part of the Austro-Hungarian Empire, together with other Italian-speaking areas on the eastern Adriatic. This triggered the gradual rise of Italian irredentism among many Italians in Istria, Kvarner and Dalmatia, who demanded the unification of the Julian March, Kvarner and Dalmatia with Italy. Before 1859, Italian was the language of administration, education, the press, and the Austrian navy; people who wished to acquire higher social standing and separate from the Slav peasantry became Italians. In the years after 1866, Italians lost their privileges in Austria-Hungary, their assimilation of the Slavs came to an end, and they found themselves under growing pressure by other rising nations; with the rising Slav tide after 1890, italianized Slavs reverted to being Croats.

Austrian rulers found use of the racial antagonism and financed Slav schools and promoted Croatian as the official language, and many Italians chose voluntary exile. During the meeting of the Council of Ministers of 12 November 1866, Emperor Franz Joseph I of Austria outlined a wide-ranging project aimed at the Germanization or Slavization of the areas of the empire with an Italian presence:

His Majesty expressed the precise order that action be taken decisively against the influence of the Italian elements still present in some regions of the Crown and, appropriately occupying the posts of public, judicial, masters employees as well as with the influence of the press, work in South Tyrol, Dalmatia and Littoral for the Germanization and Slavization of these territories according to the circumstances, with energy and without any regard. His Majesty calls the central offices to the strong duty to proceed in this way to what has been established.

— Franz Joseph I of Austria, Council of the Crown of 12 November 1866

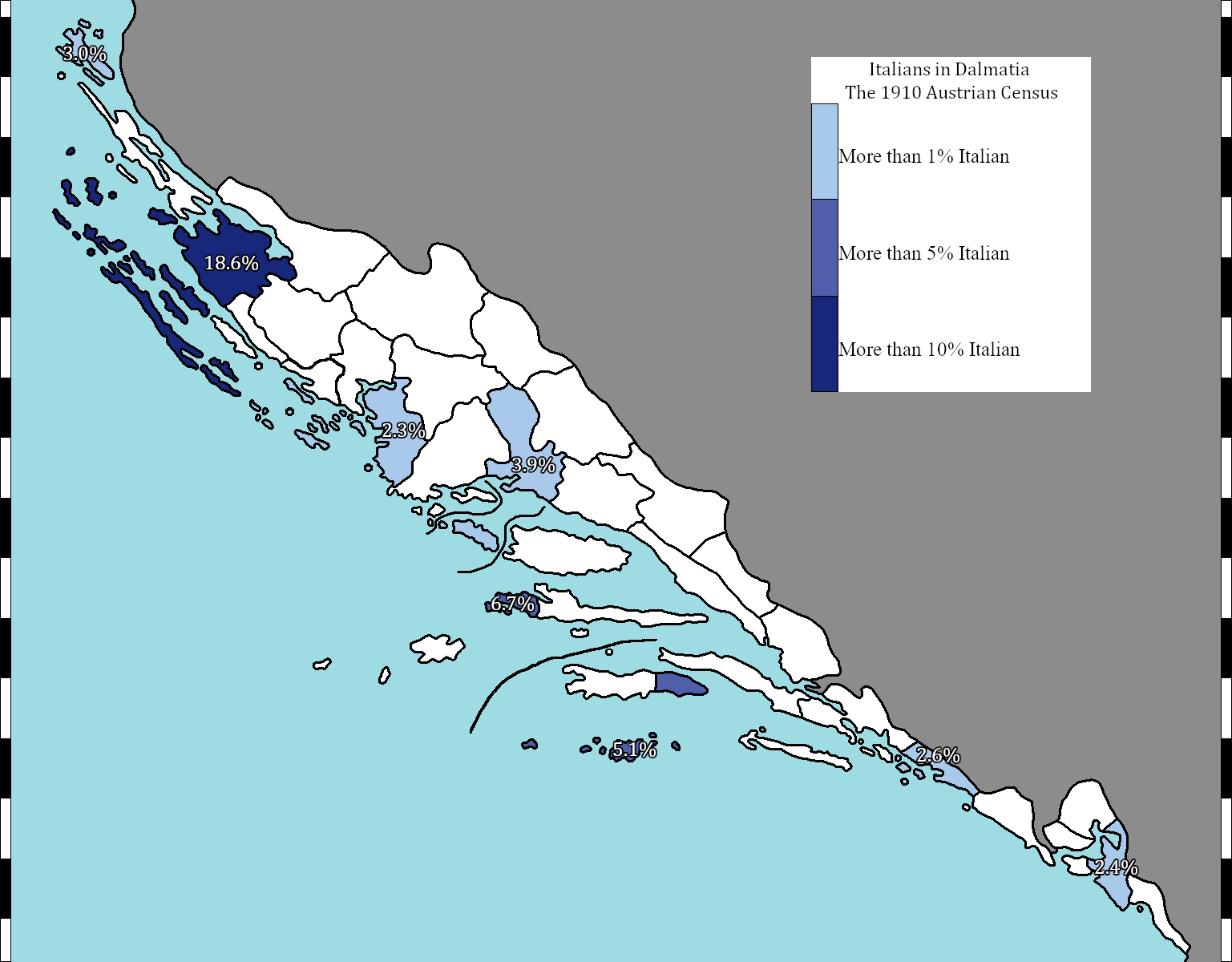
Proportion of Dalmatian Italians in districts of Dalmatia in 1910, per the Austro-Hungarian census

Istrian Italians made up about a third of the population in Istria in 1900. Dalmatia, especially its maritime cities, once had a substantial local ethnic Italian population (Dalmatian Italians). In Dalmatia, there was a constant decline in the Italian population, in a context of repression that also took on violent connotations. During this period, Austrians carried out an aggressive anti-Italian policy through a forced Slavization of Dalmatia. According to Austrian census, the Dalmatian Italians formed 12.5% of the population in 1865. In the 1910 Austro-Hungarian census, Istria had a population of 57.8% Slavic-speakers (Croat and Slovene), and 38.1% Italian speakers. For the Austrian Kingdom of Dalmatia, (i.e. Dalmatia), the 1910 numbers were 96.2% Slavic speakers and 2.8% Italian speakers. In Rijeka the Italians were the relative majority in the municipality (48.61% in 1910), and in addition to the large Croatian community (25.95% in the same year), there was also a fair Hungarian minority (13.03%). According to the official Croatian census of 2011, there are 2,445 Italians in Rijeka (equal to 1.9% of the total population).

The Italian population in Dalmatia was concentrated in the major coastal cities. In the city of Split in 1890 there were 1,969 Dalmatian Italians (12.5% of the population of the urban core / 8.7% in the commune as a whole), in Zadar 7,423 (64.6% / 27.2%), in Šibenik 1,018 (14.5% / 5.3%), in Kotor 623 (18.7% / 11.9%) and in Dubrovnik 331 (4.6% / 3.2%). In other Dalmatian localities, according to Austrian censuses, Dalmatian Italians experienced a sudden decrease: in the twenty years 1890-1910, in Rab they went from 225 to 151, in Vis from 352 to 92, in Pag from 787 to 23, completely disappearing in almost all the inland locations.

While Slavic-speakers made up 80-95% of the Dalmatia populace, only Italian language schools existed until 1848, and due to restrictive voting laws, the Italian-speaking aristocratic minority retained political control of Dalmatia. Only after Austria liberalised elections in 1870, allowing more majority Slavs to vote, did Croatian parties gain control. Croatian finally became an official language in Dalmatia in 1883, along with Italian. Yet minority Italian-speakers continued to wield strong influence, since Austria favoured Italians for government work, thus in the Austrian capital of Dalmatia, Zara, the proportion of Italians continued to grow, making it the only Dalmatian city with an Italian majority.

In 1909, the Italian language lost its status as the official language of Dalmatia in favor of Croatian only; previously, both languages were recognized. Thus, Italian could no longer be used in the public and administrative sphere.

=== World War I and post-War period ===
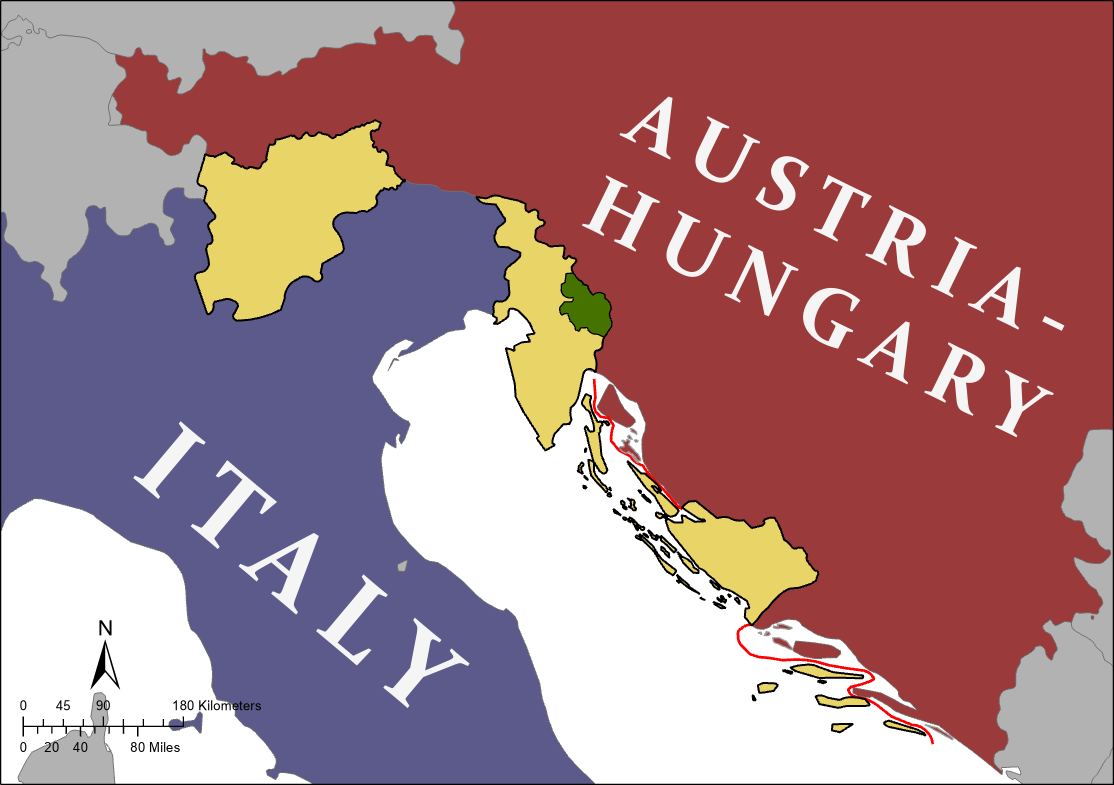
Territories promised to Italy by the London Pact (1915), i.e. Trentino-Alto Adige, the Julian March and Dalmatia (tan), and the Snežnik Plateau area (green). Dalmatia, after the WWI, however, was not assigned to Italy but to Yugoslavia

In 1915, Italy abrogated its alliance and declared war on the Austro-Hungarian Empire, leading to bloody conflict mainly on the Isonzo and Piave fronts. Britain, France and Russia had been "keen to bring neutral Italy into World War I on their side. However, Italy drove a hard bargain, demanding extensive territorial concessions once the war had been won". In a deal to bring Italy into the war, under the London Pact, Italy would be allowed to annex not only Italian-speaking Trentino and Trieste, but also German-speaking South Tyrol, Istria (which included large non-Italian communities), and the northern part of Dalmatia including the areas of Zadar (Zara) and Šibenik (Sebenico). Mainly Italian Fiume (present-day Rijeka) was excluded.

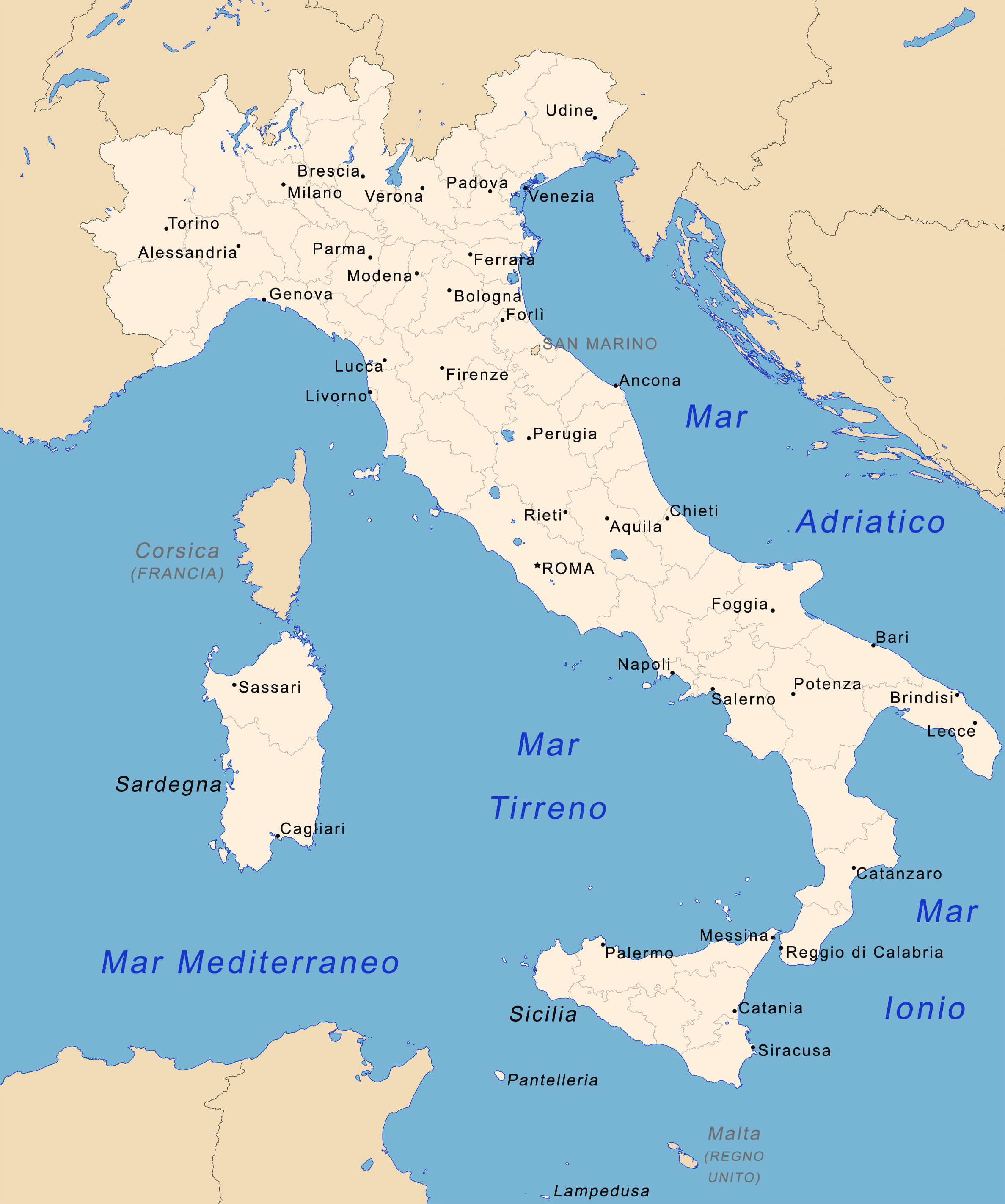
On the left, a map of the Kingdom of Italy before the First World War; on the right, a map of the Kingdom of Italy after the First World War

In November 1918, after the surrender of Austria-Hungary, Italy occupied militarily Trentino Alto-Adige, the Julian March, Istria, the Kvarner Gulf and Dalmatia, all Austro-Hungarian territories. On the Dalmatian coast, Italy established the first Governorate of Dalmatia, which had the provisional aim of ferrying the territory towards full integration into the Kingdom of Italy, progressively importing national legislation in place of the previous one. The administrative capital was Zara. The Governorate of Dalmatia was evacuated following the Italo-Yugoslav agreements which resulted in the Treaty of Rapallo (1920). After the war, the Treaty of Rapallo between the Kingdom of Serbs, Croats and Slovenes (later the Kingdom of Yugoslavia) and the Kingdom of Italy (12 November 1920), Italy annexed Zadar in Dalmatia and some minor islands, almost all of Istria along with Trieste, excluding the island of Krk, and part of Kastav commune, which mostly went to the Kingdom of Serbs, Croats and Slovenes. By the Treaty of Rome (27 January 1924), the Free State of Fiume (Rijeka) was divided between Italy and Yugoslavia.

Between 31 December 1910 and 1 December 1921, Istria lost 15.1% of its population. The last survey under the Austrian empire recorded 404,309 inhabitants, which dropped to 343,401 by the first Italian census after the war. While the decrease was certainly related to World War I and the changes in political administration, emigration also was a major factor. In the immediate post-World War I period, Istria saw an intense migration outflow. Pula, for example, was badly affected by the drastic dismantling of its massive Austrian military and bureaucratic apparatus of more than 20,000 soldiers and security forces, as well as the dismissal of the employees from its naval shipyard. A serious economic crisis in the rest of Italy forced thousands of Croat peasants to move to Yugoslavia, which became the main destination of the Istrian exodus.

Due to a lack of reliable statistics, the true magnitude of Istrian emigration during that period cannot be assessed accurately. Estimates provided by varying sources with different research methods show that about 30,000 Istrians migrated between 1918 and 1921. Most of them were Austrians, Hungarians and Slavic citizens who used to work for the Austro-Hungarian Empire.

=== Croats and Slovenes under Italian Fascist rule ===
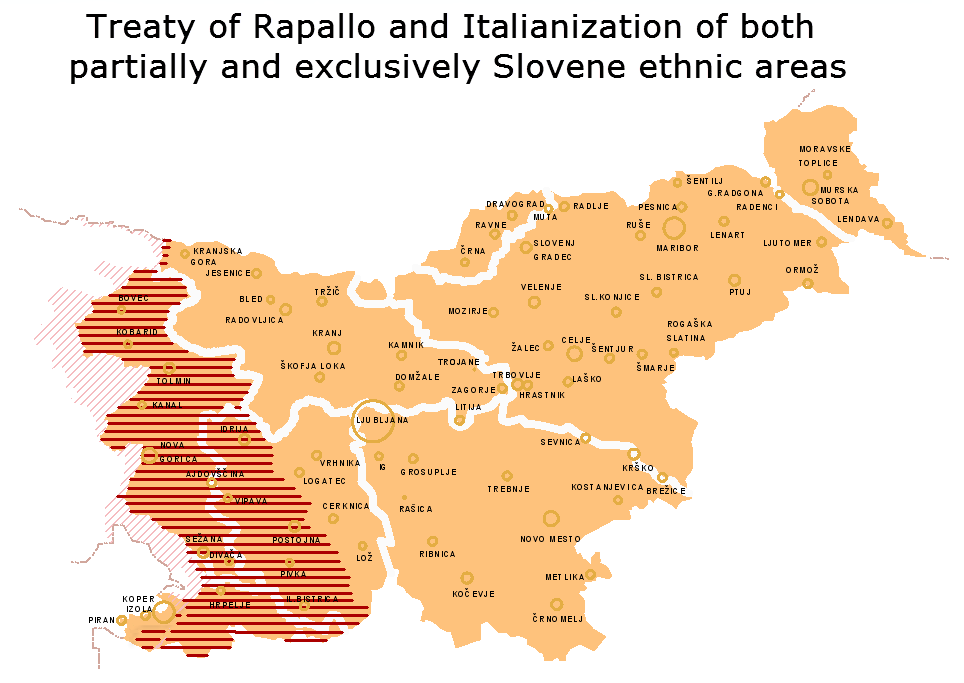
Outlined in red, the territory inhabited almost exclusively by Slovenes assigned to the Kingdom of Italy on the basis of the Treaty of Rapallo which was the subject of Italianization

After World War I, under the Treaty of Rapallo between the Kingdom of Serbs, Croats and Slovenes (later Kingdom of Yugoslavia) and the Kingdom of Italy (12 November 1920), Italy obtained almost all of Istria with Trieste, the exception being the island of Krk and part of Kastav commune, which went to the Kingdom of Serbs, Croats and Slovenes. By the Treaty of Rome (27 January 1924) Italy took Rijeka as well, which had been planned to become an independent state.

In these areas, there was a forced policy of Italianization of the population in the 1920s and 1930s. In addition, there were acts of fascist violence not hampered by the authorities, such as the torching of the Narodni dom (National House) in Pula and Trieste carried out at night by Fascists with the connivance of the police (13 July 1920). The situation deteriorated further after the annexation of the Julian March, especially after Benito Mussolini came to power (1922). In March 1923 the prefect of the Julian March prohibited the use of Croatian and Slovene in the administration, whilst their use in law courts was forbidden by Royal decree on 15 October 1925.

The activities of Croatian and Slovenian societies and associations (Sokol, reading rooms, etc.) had already been forbidden during the occupation, but specifically so later with the Law on Associations (1925), the Law on Public Demonstrations (1926) and the Law on Public Order (1926). All Slovenian and Croatian societies and sporting and cultural associations had to cease every activity in line with a decision of provincial fascist secretaries dated 12 June 1927. On a specific order from the prefect of Trieste on 19 November 1928 the Edinost political society was also dissolved. Croatian and Slovenian co-operatives in Istria, which at first were absorbed by the Pula or Trieste Savings Banks, were gradually liquidated.

At the same time, the Kingdom of Yugoslavia attempted a policy of forced Croatisation against the Italian minority in Dalmatia. The majority of the Italian Dalmatian minority decided to transfer in the Kingdom of Italy.

=== World War II ===
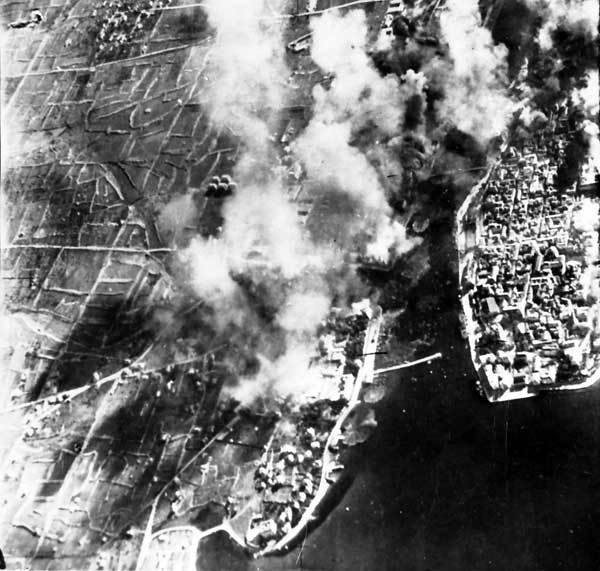
Bombing of Zadar in World War II by the Allies (1944): from these events began the exodus of the Dalmatian Italians from the city.

During World War II, in 1941, Nazi Germany, Fascist Italy, Hungary, and Bulgaria occupied Yugoslavia, redrawing their borders to include former parts of the Yugoslavian state. A new Nazi puppet state, the Independent State of Croatia (NDH), was created. With the Treaties of Rome, the NDH agreed to cede to Italy Dalmatian territory, creating the second Governorate of Dalmatia, from north of Zadar to south of Split, with inland areas, plus nearly all the Adriatic islands and Gorski Kotar. Italy then annexed these territories, while all the remainder of southern Croatia, including the entire coast, were placed under Italian occupation. Italy also appointed an Italian, Prince Aimone, Duke of Aosta, as king of Croatia.

Italy proceeded to Italianize the annexed areas of Dalmatia. Place names were Italianized, and Italian was made the official language in all schools, churches and government administration. All Croatian cultural societies were banned, while Italians took control of all key mineral, industrial and business establishments. Italian policies prompted resistance by Dalmatians, many joined the Partisans. This led to further Italian repressive measures - shooting of civilian hostages, burning of villages, confiscation of properties. Italians took many civilians to concentration camps - altogether, some 80,000 Dalmatians, 12% of the population, passed through Italian concentration camps.

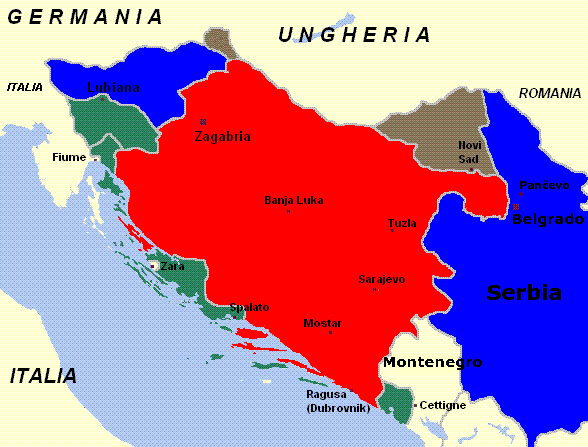
Division of Yugoslavia after its invasion by the Axis powers. Areas annexed by Italy: the area constituting the province of Ljubljana, the area merged with the province of Fiume and the areas making up the Governorate of Dalmatia Independent State of Croatia Area occupied by Nazi Germany Areas occupied by Kingdom of Hungary

Many Croats moved from the Italian-occupied area and took refuge in the satellite state of Croatia, which became the battleground for a guerrilla war between the Axis and the Yugoslav Partisans. Following the surrender of Italy in 1943, much of Italian-controlled Dalmatia was liberated by the Partisans, then taken over by German forces in a brutal campaign, who then returned control to the puppet Independent State of Croatia. Vis Island remained in Partisan hands, while Zadar, Rijeka, Istria, Cres, Lošinj, Lastovo and Palagruža became part of the German Operationszone Adriatisches Küstenland. The Partisans took Dalmatia in 1944, and with that Zadar, Rijeka, Istria, Cres, Lošinj, Lastovo and Palagruža became reunited with Croatia. After 1945, most of the remaining Dalmatian Italians fled the region (350,000 Italians escaped from Istria and Dalmatia in the Istrian-Dalmatian exodus). Currently there are only 300 Dalmatian Italians in the Croatian Dalmatia and 500 Dalmatian Italians in coastal Montenegro. After World War II, Dalmatia became part of the People's Republic of Croatia, part of the Federative People's Republic of Yugoslavia.

The territory of the former Kingdom of Dalmatia was divided between two federal republics of Yugoslavia and most of the territory went to Croatia, leaving only the Bay of Kotor to Montenegro. When Yugoslavia dissolved in 1991, those borders were retained and remain in force. During the Croatian War of Independence, most of Dalmatia was a battleground between the Government of Croatia and the Yugoslav People's Army (JNA), which aided the proto-state of Serbian Krajina, with much of the northern part of the region around Knin and the far south around, but not including, Dubrovnik being placed under the control of Serb forces. Croatia did regain the southern territories in 1992 but did not regain the north until Operation Storm in 1995. After the war, a number of towns and municipalities in the region were designated Areas of Special State Concern.

=== Events of 1943 ===
When the fascist regime collapsed in 1943, reprisals against Italian fascists took place. Several hundred Italians were killed by Josip Broz Tito's resistance movement in September 1943; some had been connected to the fascist regime, while others were victims of personal hatred or the attempt of the Partisan resistance to get rid of its real or supposed enemies.

=== The Foibe massacres ===
Between 1943 and 1947, the exodus was bolstered by a wave of violence, known as the "Foibe massacres", mainly committed by OZNA and Yugoslav Partisans in Julian March (Karst Region and Istria), Kvarner and Dalmatia, against the local ethnic Italian population (Istrian Italians and Dalmatian Italians), as well against anti-communists in general (even Croats and Slovenes), usually associated with Fascism, Nazism and collaboration with Axis, and against real, potential or presumed opponents of Tito communism. The type of attack was state terrorism, reprisal killings, and ethnic cleansing against Italians.

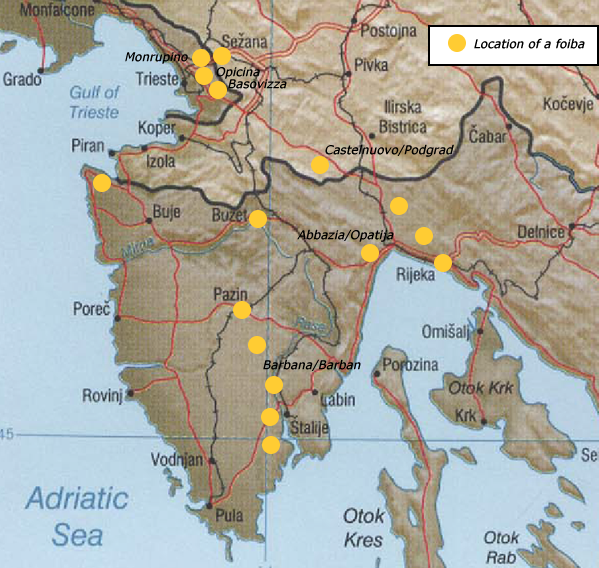
Locations of some of the foibe

The mixed Italian-Slovenian Historical Commission, established in 1995 by the two governments to investigate these matters, described the circumstances of the 1945 killings:

14. These events were triggered by the atmosphere of settling accounts with the fascists; but, as it seems, they mostly proceeded from a preliminary plan which included several tendencies: endeavors to remove persons and structures who were in one way or another (regardless of their personal responsibility) linked with Fascism, with the Nazi supremacy, with collaboration and with the Italian state, and endeavors to carry out preventive cleansing of real, potential or only alleged opponents of the communist regime, and the annexation of the Julian March to the new SFR Yugoslavia. The initial impulse was instigated by the revolutionary movement, which was changed into a political regime and transformed the charge of national and ideological intolerance between the partisans into violence at the national level.

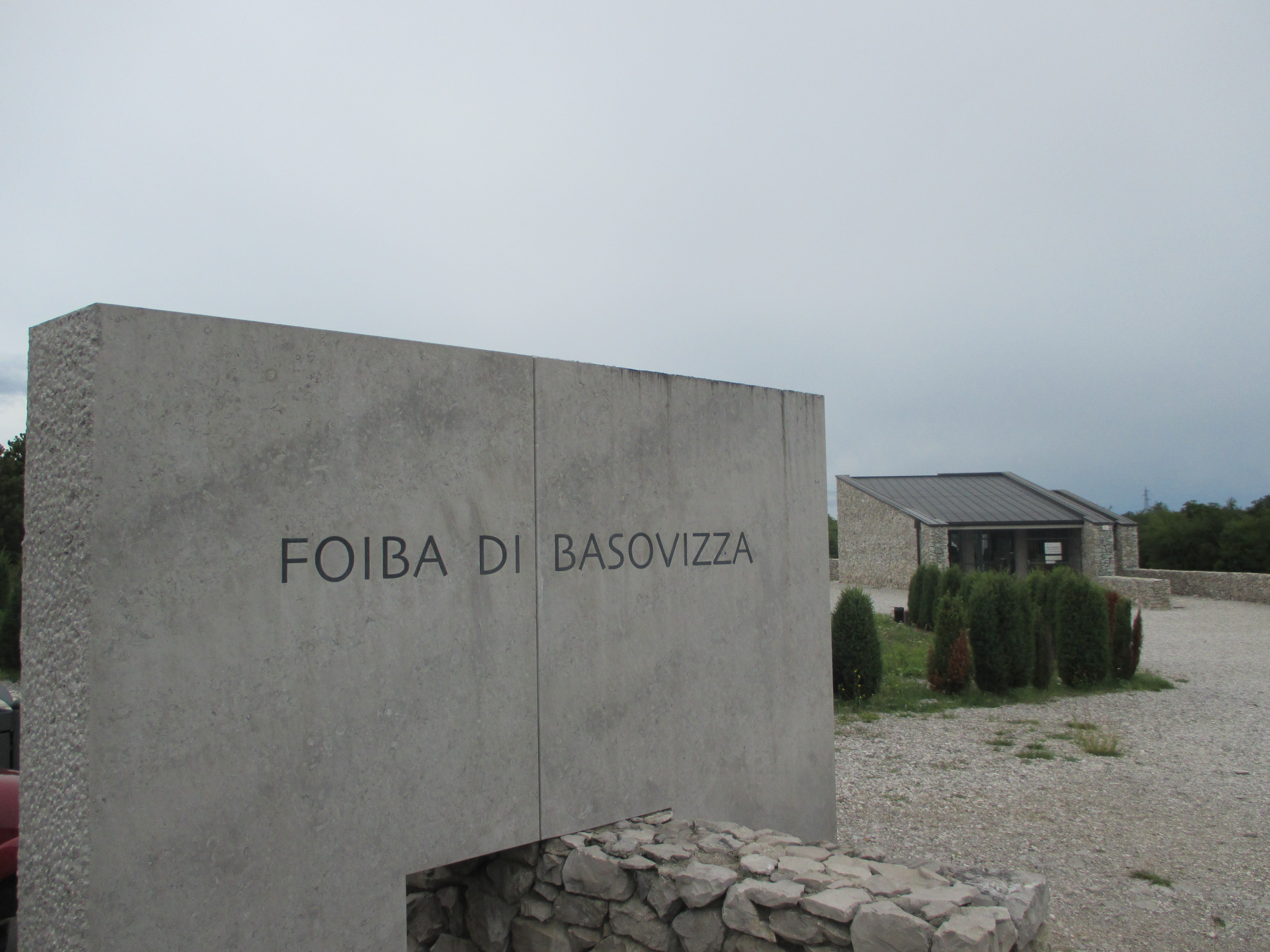
The foiba di Basovizza, near Trieste

The Yugoslav partisans intended to kill whoever could oppose or compromise the future annexation of Italian territories: as a preventive purge of real, potential or presumed opponents of Tito communism (Italian, Slovenian and Croatian anti-communists, collaborators and radical nationalists), the Yugoslav partisans also exterminated the native anti-fascist autonomists — including the leadership of Italian anti-fascist partisan organizations and the leaders of Fiume's Autonomist Party, like Mario Blasich and Nevio Skull, who supported local independence from both Italy and Yugoslavia — for example in the city of Fiume, where at least 650 were killed after the entry of the Yugoslav units, without any due trial.

The term refers to the victims who were often thrown alive into foibas (deep natural sinkholes; by extension, it also was applied to the use of mine shafts, etc., to hide the bodies). In a wider or symbolic sense, some authors used the term to apply to all disappearances or killings of Italian people in the territories occupied by Yugoslav forces. They excluded possible 'foibe' killings by other parties or forces. Others included deaths resulting from the forced deportation of Italians, or those who died while trying to flee from these contested lands.

The estimated number of people killed in the foibe is disputed, varying from hundreds to thousands, according to some sources 11,000 or 20,000. The Italian historian, Raoul Pupo estimates 3,000 to 4,000 total victims, across all areas of former Yugoslavia and Italy from 1943 to 1945, with the primary target being military and repressive forces of the Fascist regime, and civilians associated with the regime, including Slavic collaborators. He places the events in the broader context of "the collapse of a structure of power and oppression: that of the fascist state in 1943, that of the Nazi-fascist state of the Adriatic coast in 1945". The foibe massacres were followed by the Istrian–Dalmatian exodus.

== The exodus ==
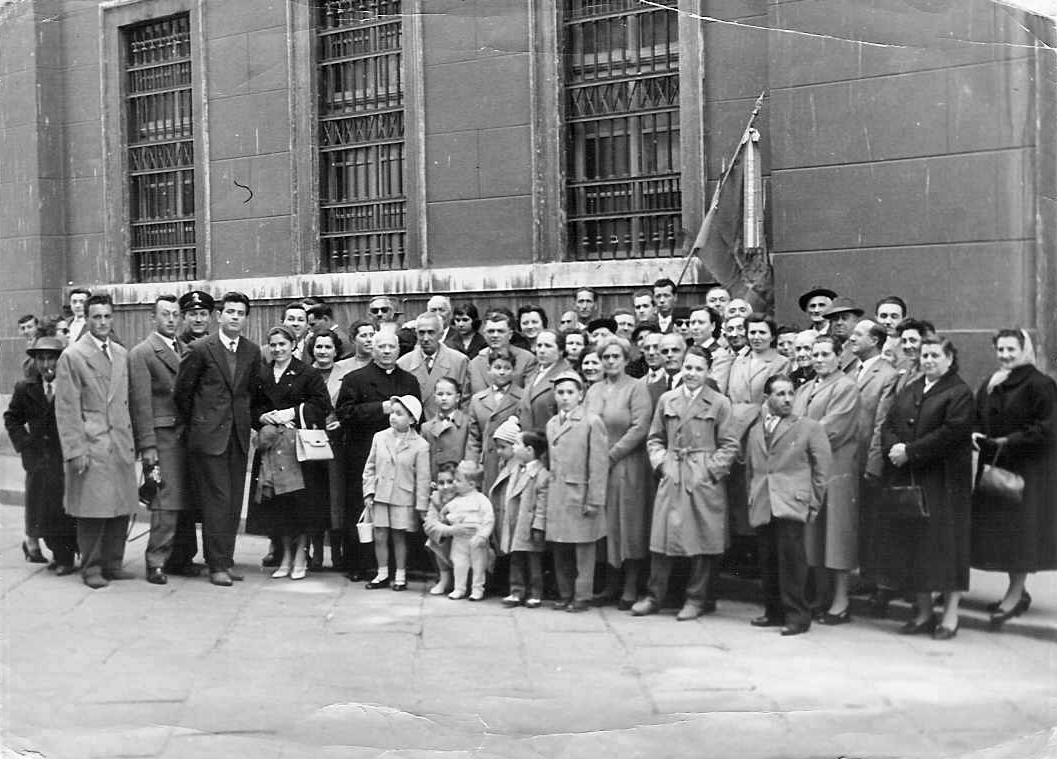
A group of exiles (Trieste, 1953)

Economic insecurity, ethnic hatred and the international political context that eventually led to the Iron Curtain resulted in up to 350,000 people, mostly Italians, choosing to leave Istria (and even Dalmatia and northern Julian March).

The exiles were to be given compensation for their loss of property and other indemnity by the Italian state under the terms of the peace treaties, but in the end did not receive anything. The exiles having fled intolerable conditions in their homeland on the promise of aid in the Italian homeland, were herded together in former concentration camps and prisons. Exiles also encountered hostility from those Italians who viewed them as taking away scarce food and jobs. Following the exodus, the areas were settled with Yugoslav people.

In a 1991 interview with the Italian magazine Panorama, prominent Yugoslav political dissident Milovan Đilas claimed to have been dispatched to Istria alongside Edvard Kardelj in 1946, to organize anti-Italian propaganda. He stated it was seen as "necessary to employ all kinds of pressure to persuade Italians to leave", due to their constituting a majority in urban areas. Although he was stripped of his offices in 1954, in 1946 Đilas was a high-ranking Yugoslav politician: a member of the Yugoslav Communist Party's Central Committee, in charge of its department of propaganda.

During the years 1946 and 1947, there was also a counter-exodus. In a gesture of comradeship, hundreds of Italians Communists workers from the city of Monfalcone and Trieste, moved to Yugoslavia and more precisely to the shipyards of Rijeka taking the place of the departed Italians. They viewed the new Yugoslavia of Tito as the only place where the building of socialism was possible. They were soon bitterly disappointed. They were accused of deviationism by the Yugoslav Regime and some were deported to concentration camps.

The Italian bishop of the Catholic diocese of Poreč and Pula Raffaele Radossi was replaced by Slovene Mihovil Toroš on 2 July 1947. When Bishop Radossi was in Žbandaj officiating a confirmation in September 1946, local activists surrounded him in a Partisan kolo dance.

Bishop Radossi subsequently moved from the bishop's residence in Poreč to Pula, which was under a joint United Kingdom-United States Allied Administration at the time. He officiated his last confirmation in October 1946 in Filipana where he narrowly avoided an attack by a group of thugs. The Bishop of Rijeka, Ugo Camozzo, also left for Italy on 3 August 1947.

=== Periods of the exodus ===
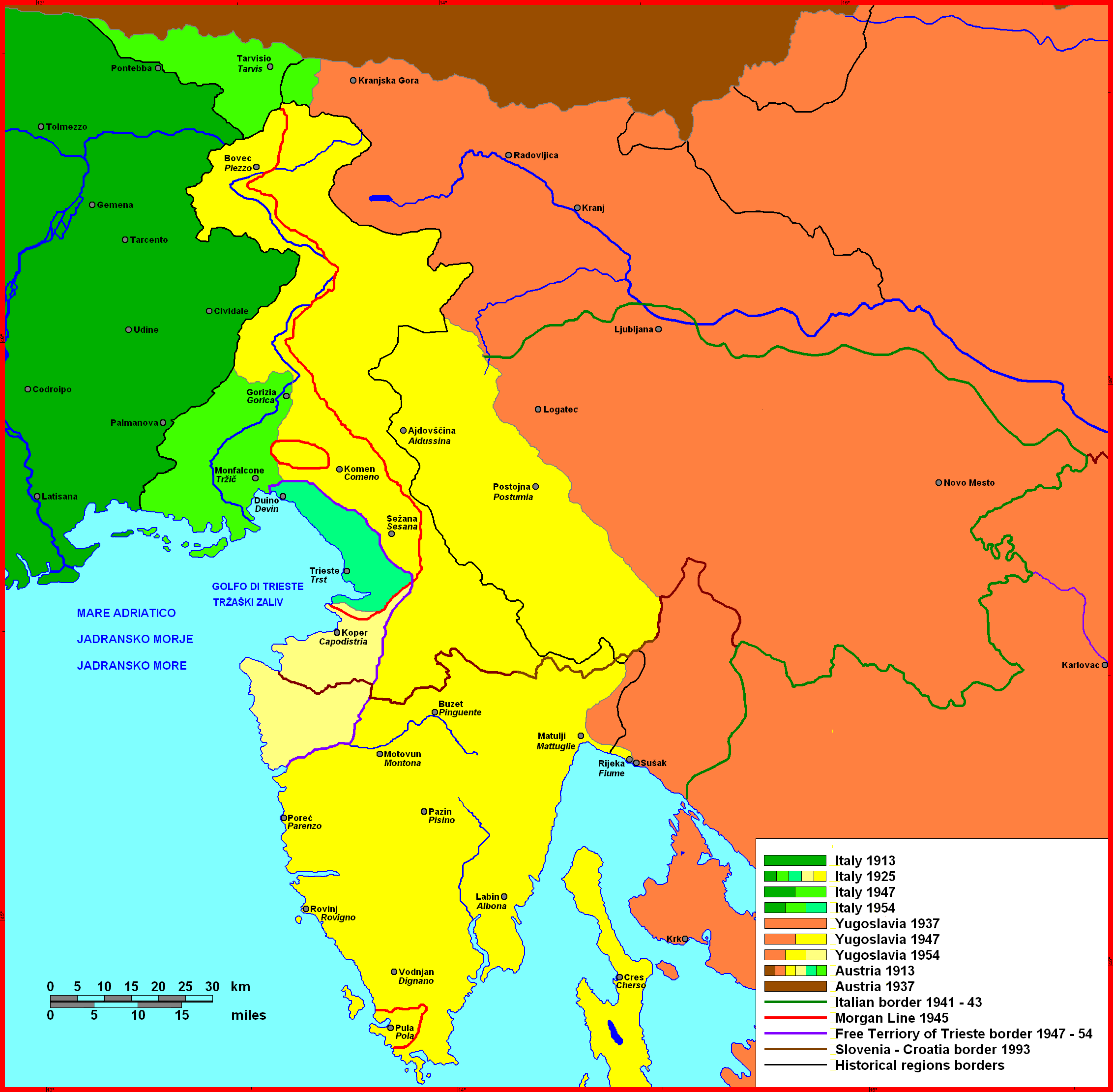
Changes to the Italian eastern border from 1920 to 1975. The Austrian Littoral, later renamed the Julian March, which was assigned to Italy in 1920 with the Treaty of Rapallo (with adjustments of its border in 1924 after the Treaty of Rome) and which was then ceded to Yugoslavia in 1947 with the Treaty of Paris Areas annexed to Italy in 1920 and remained Italian even after 1947 Areas annexed to Italy in 1920, passed to the Free Territory of Trieste in 1947 with the Paris treaties and definitively assigned to Italy in 1975 with the Treaty of Osimo Areas annexed to Italy in 1920, passed to the Free Territory of Trieste in 1947 with the Paris treaties and definitively assigned to Yugoslavia in 1975 with the Osimo treaty

The exodus took place between 1943 and 1960, with the main movements of population taking place in the following years:

- 1943
- 1945
- 1947
- 1954

The first period took place after the surrender of the Italian army and the beginning of the first wave of anti-fascist violence. The Wehrmacht was engaged in a front-wide retreat from the Yugoslav Partisans, along with the local collaborationist forces (the Ustaše, the Domobranci, the Chetniks, and units of Mussolini's Italian Social Republic). The first city to see a massive departure of local ethnic Italians was Zadar. In November 1943, Zadar was bombed by the Allies, with serious civilian casualties (fatalities recorded range from under 1,000 to as many as 4,000 of over 20,000 city's inhabitants). Many died in carpet bombings. Many landmarks and centuries old works of art were destroyed. A significant number of civilians fled the city.

In late October 1944, the German army and most of the Italian civilian administration abandoned the city. On 31 October 1944, the Partisans seized the city, until then a part of Mussolini's Italian Social Republic. At the start of World War II, Zadar had a population of 24,000 and, by the end of 1944, this had decreased to 6,000. Formally, the city remained under Italian sovereignty until 15 September 1947 but by that date the exodus from the city had been already almost total (Paris Peace Treaties).

A second wave left at the end of the war with the beginning of killings, expropriation and other forms of pressure from the Yugoslavs authorities to establish control.

On 2–3 May 1945, Rijeka was occupied by vanguards of the Yugoslav Army. Here more than 500 collaborators, Italian military and public servants were summarily executed; the leaders of the local Autonomist Party, including Mario Blasich and Nevio Skull, were also murdered. By January 1946, more than 20,000 people had left the province.

After 1945, the departure of the local ethnic Italians was bolstered by events of less violent nature. According to the American historian Pamela Ballinger:

After 1945 physical threats generally gave way to subtler forms of intimidation such as the nationalization and confiscation of properties, the interruption of transport services (by both land and sea) to the city of Trieste, the heavy taxation of salaries of those who worked in Zone A and lived in Zone B, the persecution of clergy and teachers, and economic hardship caused by the creation of a special border currency, the Jugolira.

The third part of the exodus took place after the Paris peace treaty, when Istria was assigned to the Socialist Federal Republic of Yugoslavia, except for a small area in the northwest part that formed the independent Free Territory of Trieste. The coastal city of Pula was the site of the large-scale exodus of its Italian population. Between December 1946 and September 1947, Pula almost completely emptied as its residents left all their possessions and "opted" for Italian citizenship. 28,000 of the city's population of 32,000 left. The evacuation of the residents has been organized by Italian civil and Allied military authorities in March 1947, in anticipation of the city's passage from the control of the Allied Military Government for Occupied Territories to the Yugoslav rule, scheduled for September 1947.

The fourth period took place after the Memorandum of Understanding in London. It gave provisional civil administration of Zone A (with Trieste), to Italy, and Zone B to Yugoslavia. Finally, in 1975 the Treaty of Osimo officially divided the former Free Territory of Trieste between Socialist Federal Republic of Yugoslavia and the Italian Republic.

=== Estimates of the exodus ===
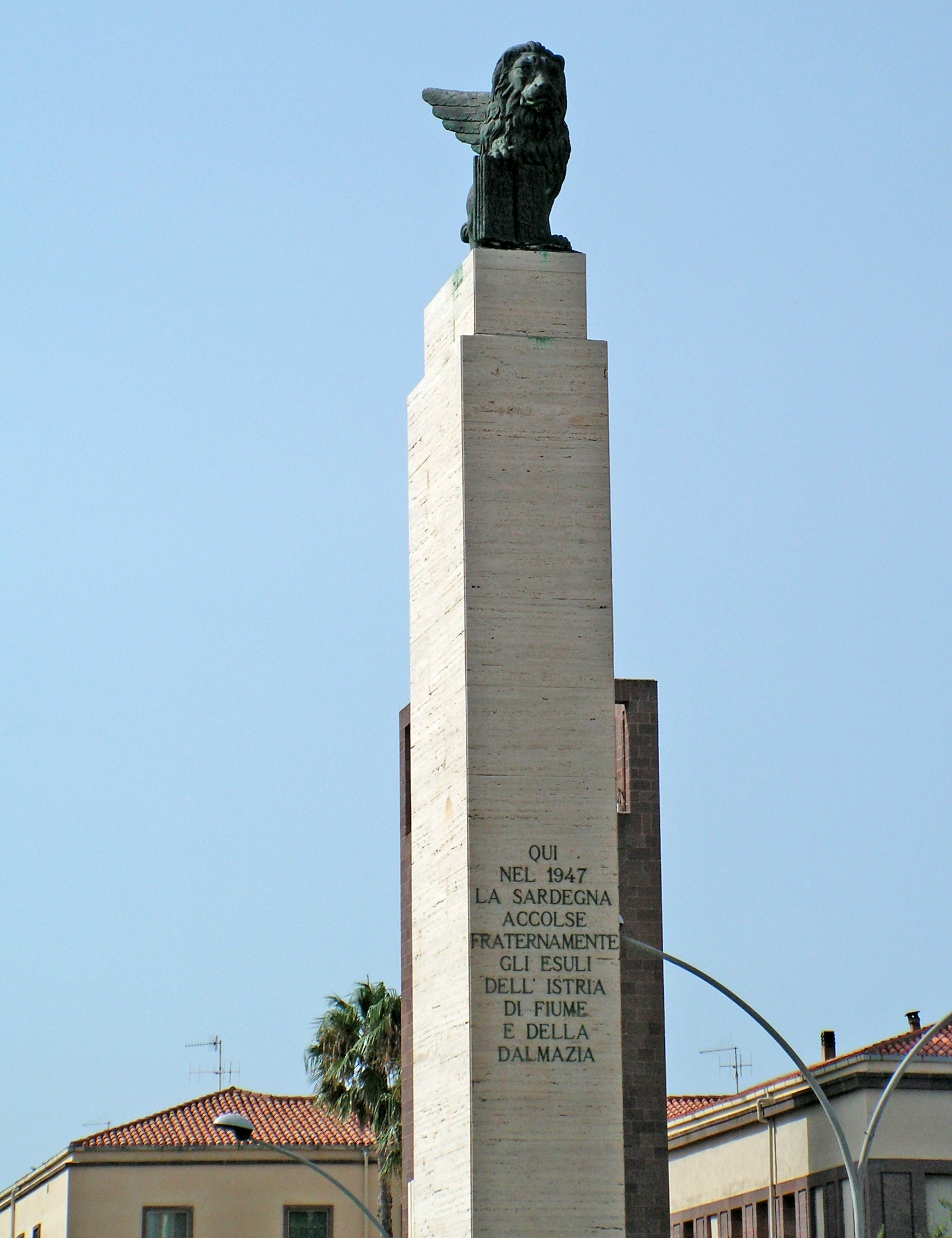
Commemorative column dedicated to the Istrian-Dalmatian exodus in Fertilia, near Alghero, Sardinia

Several estimates of the exodus by historians:

- Vladimir Žerjavić (Croat), 191,421 Italian exiles from Croatian territory.
- Nevenka Troha (Slovene), 40,000 Italian and 3,000 Slovene exiles from Slovenian territory.
- Raoul Pupo (Italian), about 250,000 Italian exiles
- Flaminio Rocchi (Italian), about 350,000 Italian exiles

The mixed Italian-Slovenian Historical Commission verified 27,000 migrants from Slovenian Istria of which 70% were ethnic Italians. After decades of silence from the Yugoslav authorities (the history of the Istrian Exodus remained a tabooed topic in Yugoslav public discourse), Tito himself would declare in 1972 during a speech in Montenegro that three hundred thousands Istrians had left the peninsula after the war.

=== Famous exiles ===
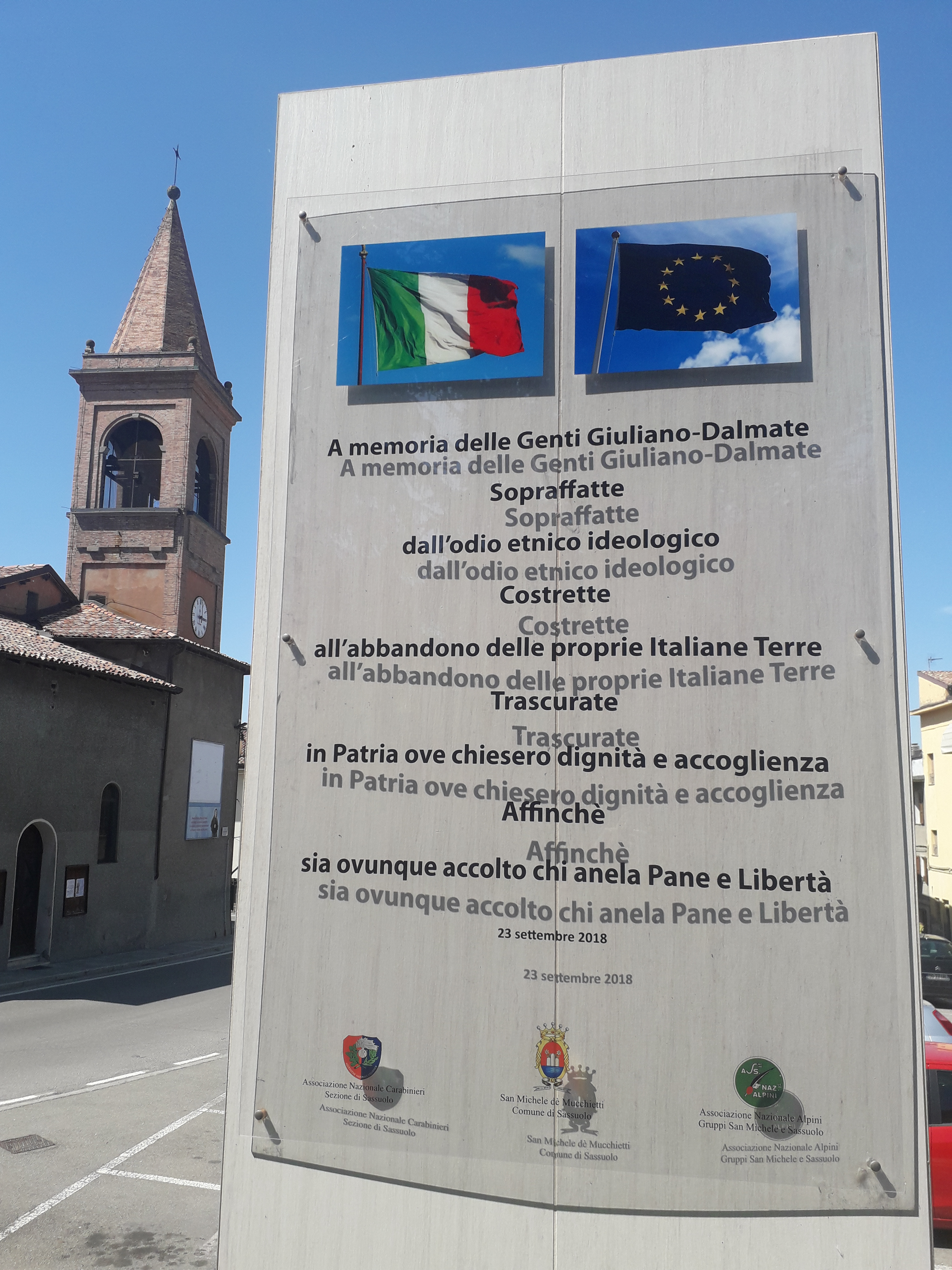
Commemorative plaque in San Michele dei Mucchietti, Sassuolo, dedicated to the Istrian-Dalmatian exodus

Those whose families left Istria or Dalmatia in the post-World War II period include:

- Alida Valli, film actress
- Mario Andretti, racing driver
- Lidia Bastianich, chef
- Nino Benvenuti, boxer: three times professional world's champion and Olympic gold medalist
- Enzo Bettiza, novelist, journalist and politician
- Oretta Fiume, actress
- Valentino Zeichen, poet and writer
- Laura Antonelli, film actress, active 1965 to 1991
- Sergio Endrigo, singer and songwriter
- Antonio Blasevich, soccer player
- Silvio Ballarin, scientist
- Dino Ciani, pianist
- Giovanni Cucelli, tennis player
- Renzo de' Vidovich, politician and journalist
- Aldo Duro, lexicographer
- Wilma Goich, singer
- Irma Gramatica, actress
- Ezio Loik, soccer player
- Ottavio Missoni, stylist
- Anna Maria Mori, writer
- Abdon Pamich, race walker
- Pier Antonio Quarantotti Gambini, writer
- Nicolò Rode, sailor
- Orlando Sirola, tennis player
- Agostino Straulino, sailor
- Leo Valiani, politician
- Rodolfo Volk, soccer player

== Legacy ==
=== Property reparation ===
On 18 February 1983, Yugoslavia and Italy signed a treaty in Rome where Yugoslavia agreed to pay US$110 million for the compensation of the exiles' property (which was confiscated after the war in the Zone B of Free Territory of Trieste).

However, the issue of the property reparation is enormously complex and remains unresolved: as of 2022, the exiles have not yet received compensation. Indeed, there is very little probability that exiles out of the Zone B of the Free Territory of Trieste will ever be compensated. The matter of property compensation is included in the program of the Istrian Democratic Assembly, the regional party currently administrating the Istria County.

=== Minority rights in Yugoslavia ===
In connection with the exodus and during the period of communist Yugoslavia (1945–1991), the equality of ethno-nations and national minorities and how to handle inter-ethnic relations was one of the key questions of Yugoslav internal politics. In November 1943, the federation of Yugoslavia was proclaimed by the second assembly of the Anti-Fascist Council of the National Liberation of Yugoslavia (AVNOJ). The fourth paragraph of the proclamation stated that "Ethnic minorities in Yugoslavia shall be granted all national rights". These principles were codified in the 1946 and 1963 constitutions and reaffirmed again, in great detail, by the last federal constitution of 1974.

It declared that the nations and nationalities should have equal rights (Article 245). It further stated that "… each nationality has the sovereign right freely to use its own language and script, to foster its own culture, to set up organizations for this purpose, and to enjoy other constitutionally guaranteed rights…" (Article 274).

=== Day of Remembrance ===
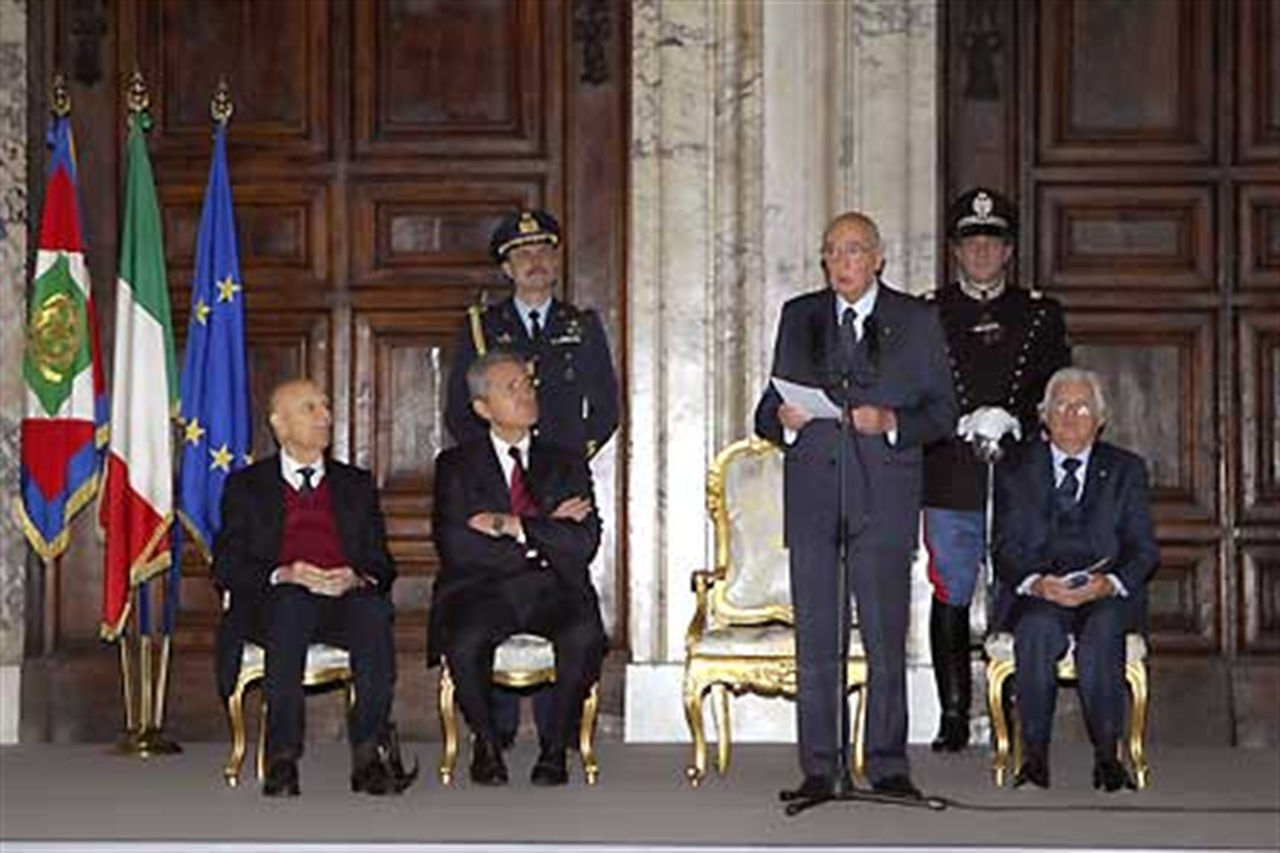
The President of the Italian Republic Giorgio Napolitano during his speech for the National Memorial Day of the Exiles and Foibe in 2007

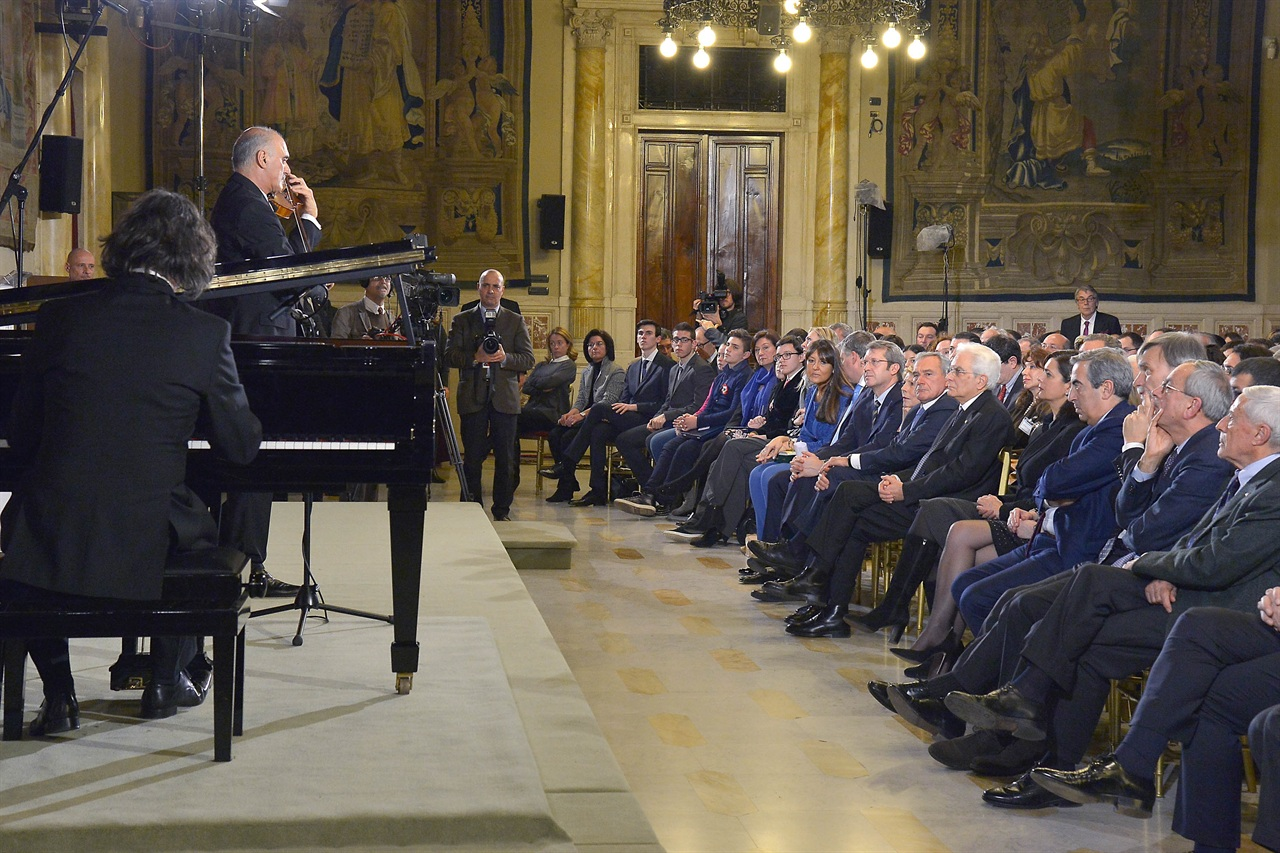
Concert at the Quirinal Palace in the presence of the President of the Italian Republic Sergio Mattarella on the occasion of the National Memorial Day of the Exiles and Foibe in 2015

In Italy, Law 92 of 30 March 2004 declared February 10 as a Day of Remembrance dedicated to the memory of the victims of Foibe and the Istrian–Dalmatian exodus. The same law created a special medal to be awarded to relatives of the victims:

Medal of Day of Remembrance to relatives of victims of foibe killings

=== Historical debate ===
There is not yet complete agreement amongst historians about the causes and the events triggering the Istrian exodus. According to the historian Pertti Ahonen:

Motivations behind the emigration are complex. Fear caused by the initial post-war violence (summary killings, confiscations, pressure from the governmental authorities) was a factor. On the Yugoslav side, it does not appear that an official decision for expulsion of Italians in Yugoslavia was ever taken. The actions of the Yugoslav authorities were contradictory: on the one hand, there were efforts to stem the flow of emigrants, such as placement of bureaucratic hurdles for emigration and suppression of its local proponents. On the other hand, Italians were pressured to leave quickly and en masse.

Slovenian historian Darko Darovec writes:

It is clear, however, that at the peace conferences the new State borders were not being drawn using ideological criteria, but on the basis of national considerations. The ideological criteria were then used to convince the national minorities to line up with one or the other side. To this end socio-political organisations with high-sounding names were created, The most important of them being SIAU, the Slavic-Italian Anti-Fascist Union, which by the necessities of the political struggle mobilised the masses in the name of 'democracy'. Anyone who thought differently, or was nationally 'inconsistent', would be subjected to the so-called 'commissions of purification'. The first great success of such a policy in the national field was the massive exodus from Pula, following the coming into effect of the peace treaty with Italy (15 September 1947). Great ideological pressure was exerted also at the time of the clash with the Kominform which caused the emigration of numerous sympathisers of the CP, Italians and others, from Istra and from Zone B of the FTT (Free Territory of Trieste)

For the mixed Italian-Slovenian Historical Commission:

Since the first post-war days, some local activists, who wreaked their anger over the acts of the Istrian Fascists upon the Italian population, had made their intention clear to rid themselves of the Italians who revolted against the new authorities. However, expert findings to-date do not confirm the testimonies of some – although influential – Yugoslav personalities about the intentional expulsion of Italians. Such a plan can be deduced – on the basis of the conduct of the Yugoslav leadership – only after the break with the Informbiro in 1948, when the great majority of the Italian Communists in Zone B – despite the initial cooperation with the Yugoslav authorities, against which more and more reservations were expressed – declared themselves against Tito's Party. Therefore, the people's government abandoned the political orientation towards the "brotherhood of the Slavs and Italians", which within the framework of the Yugoslav socialist state allowed for the existence of the politically and socially purified Italian population that would respect the ideological orientation and the national policy of the regime. The Yugoslav side perceived the departure of Italians from their native land with growing satisfaction, and in its relation to the Italian national community the wavering in the negotiations on the fate of the FTT was more and more clearly reflected. Violence, which flared up again after the 1950 elections and the 1953 Trieste crisis, and the forceful expulsion of unwanted persons were accompanied by measures to close the borders between the two zones. The national composition of Zone B was also altered by the immigration of Yugoslavs to the previously more or less exclusively Italian cities.

== The remaining Italians ==
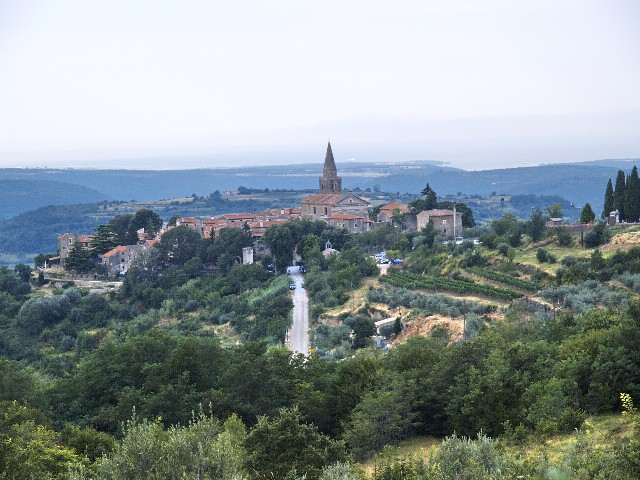
The village of Grožnjan/Grisignana is the only municipality in Croatia with a majority Italian speaking population.

According to the census organized in Croatia in 2001 and that organized in Slovenia in 2002, the Italians who remained in the former Yugoslavia amounted to 21,894 people (2,258 in Slovenia and 19,636 in Croatia). The number of speakers of Italian is larger if taking into account non-Italians who speak it as a second language.

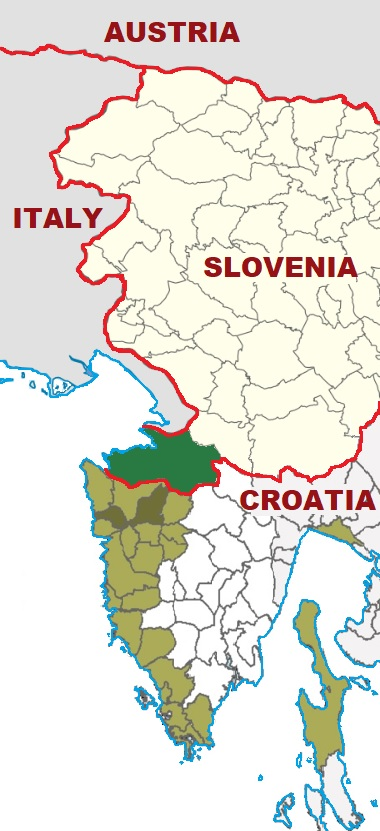
Settlement areas of the Italian national communities in Slovenia and Croatia: Settlement areas of the Italian national community in Slovenia Municipalities in Croatia where the Italian community exceeds 30% of the residents Municipalities in Croatia where the Italian community has minority language rights

In addition, since the dissolution of Yugoslavia, a significant portion of the population of Istria opted for a regional declaration in the census instead of a national one. As such, more people have Italian as a first language than those having declared Italian.

In 2001, about 500 Dalmatian Italians were counted in Dalmatia. In particular, according to the official Croatian census of 2011, there are 83 Dalmatian Italians in Split (equal to 0.05% of the total population), 16 in Šibenik (0.03%) and 27 in Dubrovnik (0.06%). According to the official Croatian census of 2021, there are 63 Dalmatian Italians in Zadar (equal to 0.09% of the total population). According to the official Montenegrin census of 2011, there are 31 Dalmatian Italians in Kotor (equal to 0.14% of the total population).

The number of people resident in Croatia declaring themselves Italian almost doubled between 1981 and 1991 censuses (i.e. before and after the dissolution of Yugoslavia). The daily newspaper La Voce del Popolo, the main newspaper for Italians of Croatia, is published in Rijeka/Fiume.

=== Official bilingualism ===
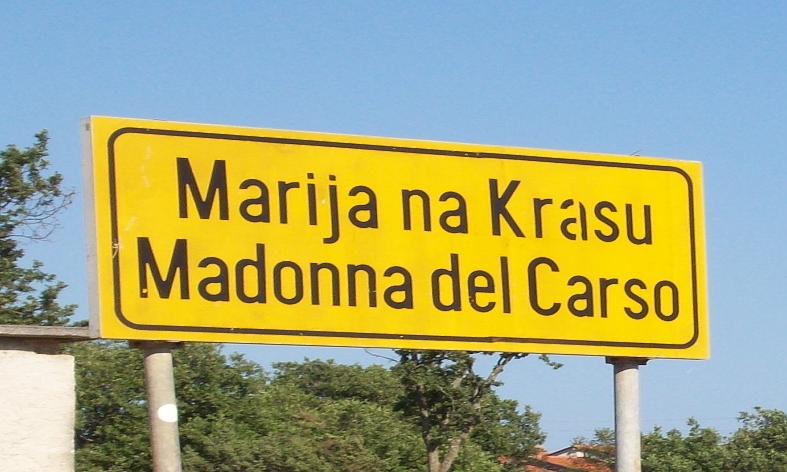
A bilingual road sign in Croatian and Italian in Istria

Italian is co-official with Slovene in four municipalities in the Slovenian portion of Istria: Piran (Italian: Pirano), Koper (Italian: Capodistria), Izola (Italian: Isola d'Istria) and Ankaran (Italian: Ancarano). In many municipalities in the Croatian portion of Istria there are bilingual statutes, and the Italian language is considered to be a co-official language. The proposal to raise Italian to a co-official language, as in the Croatian portion of Istria, has been under discussion for years.

By recognizing and respecting its cultural and historical legacy, the City of Rijeka ensures the use of its language and writing to the Italian indigenous national minority in public affairs relating to the sphere of self-government of the City of Rijeka. The City of Fiume, within the scope of its possibilities, ensures and supports the educational and cultural activity of the members of the indigenous Italian minority and its institutions.

In various municipalities of Croatian Istria, census data shows that significant numbers of Italians still live in Istria, such as 51% of the population of Grožnjan/Grisignana, 37% at Brtonigla/Verteneglio, and nearly 30% in Buje/Buie. In the village there, it is an important section of the "Comunità degli Italiani" in Croatia. Italian is co-official with Croatian in eighteen municipalities in the Croatian portion of Istria: Buje (Italian: Buie), Novigrad (Italian: Cittanova), Vodnjan (Italian: Dignano), Poreč (Italian: Parenzo), Pula (Italian: Pola), Rovinj (Italian: Rovigno), Umag (Italian: Umago), Bale (Italian: Valle d'Istria), Brtonigla (Italian: Verteneglio), Fažana (Italian: Fasana), Grožnjan (Italian: Grisignana), Kaštelir-Labinci (Italian: Castellier-Santa Domenica), Ližnjan (Italian: Lisignano), Motovun (Italian: Montona), Oprtalj (Italian: Portole), Višnjan (Italian: Visignano), Vižinada (Italian: Visinada) and Vrsar (Italian: Orsera).

=== Education and Italian language ===
==== Slovenia ====
Beside Slovene language schools, there are also kindergartens, primary schools (9 years) and high schools (4 years) with Italian as the language of instruction in Koper/Capodistria, Izola/Isola and Piran/Pirano. Italian is a compulsory subject in both Italian and Slovenian schools, in the bilingual area, the only difference is in the curriculum, as the Italian subject in Italian schools is significantly more demanding and consequently has higher assessment criteria, making it equivalent to the Slovenian subject. While the Italian subject in Slovenian schools is significantly less demanding and has fewer teaching hours.

At the state-owned University of Primorska, however, which is also established in the bilingual area, Slovene is the only language of instruction (although the official name of the university includes the Italian version, too).

==== Croatia ====
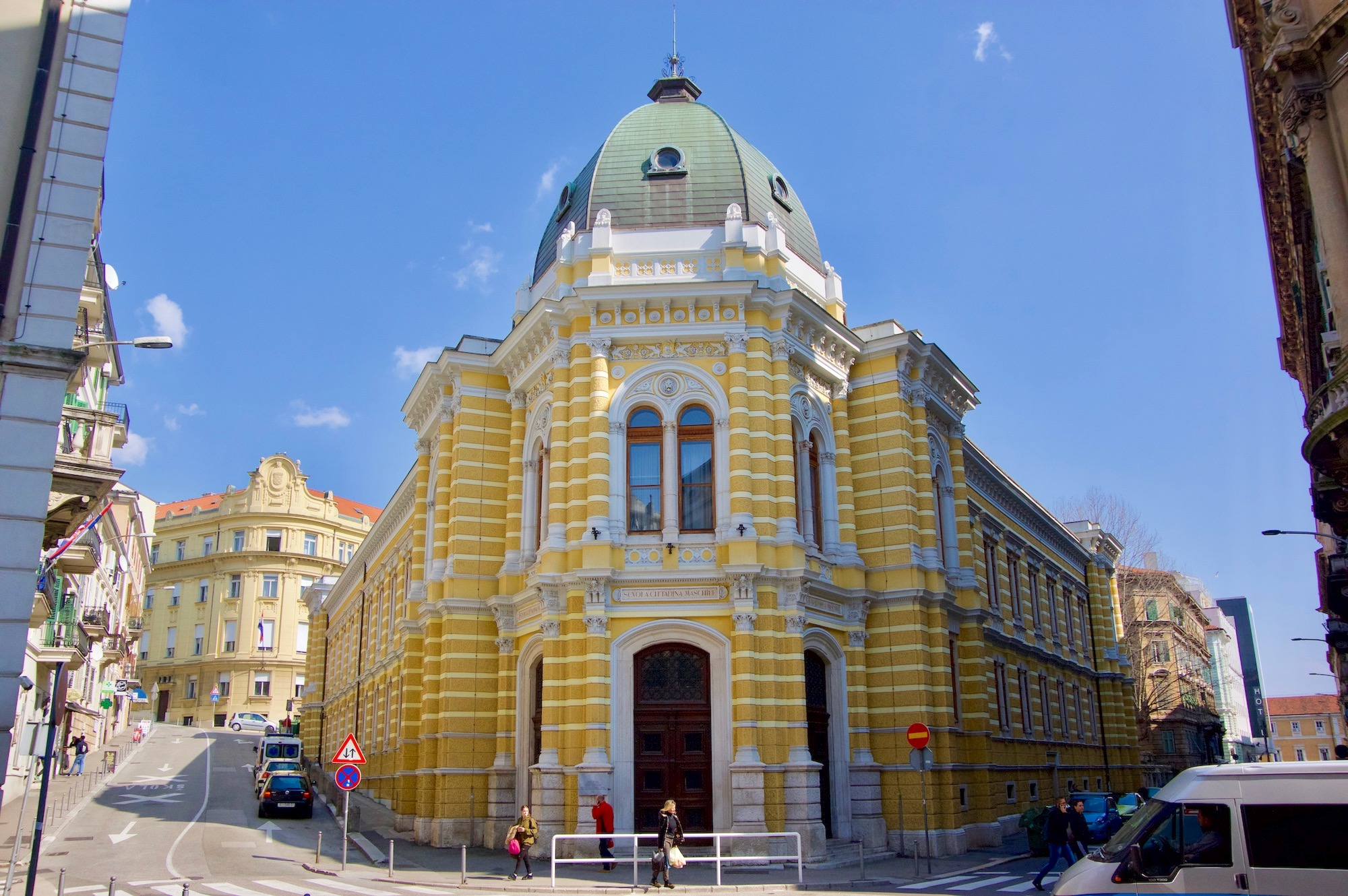
Italian Secondary School in Rijeka/Fiume

Beside Croat language schools, in Istria there are also kindergartens in Buje/Buie, Brtonigla/Verteneglio, Novigrad/Cittanova, Umag/Umago, Poreč/Parenzo, Vrsar/Orsera, Rovinj/Rovigno, Bale/Valle, Vodnjan/Dignano, Pula/Pola and Labin/Albona, as well as primary schools in Buje/Buie, Brtonigla/Verteneglio, Novigrad/Cittanova, Umag/Umago, Poreč/Parenzo, Vodnjan/Dignano, Rovinj/Rovigno, Bale/Valle and Pula/Pola, as well as lower secondary schools and upper secondary schools in Buje/Buie, Rovinj/Rovigno and Pula/Pola, all with Italian as the language of instruction.

The city of Rijeka/Fiume in the Kvarner/Carnaro region has Italian kindergartens and elementary schools, and there is an Italian Secondary School in Rijeka. The town of Mali Lošinj/Lussinpiccolo in the Kvarner/Carnaro region has an Italian kindergarten.

In Zadar, in Dalmatia region, the local Community of Italians has requested the creation of an Italian asylum since 2009. After considerable government opposition, with the imposition of a national filter that imposed the obligation to possess Italian citizenship for registration, in the end in 2013, it was opened hosting the first 25 children. This kindergarten is the first Italian educational institution opened in Dalmatia after the closure of the last Italian school, which operated there until 1953.

Since 2017, a Croatian primary school has been offering the study of the Italian language as a foreign language. Italian courses have also been activated in a secondary school and at the faculty of literature and philosophy.

== See also ==
- Foibe massacres
- National Memorial Day of the Exiles and Foibe
- Free Territory of Trieste
- World War II in Yugoslavia
- Italian Social Republic
- Istria
- Italian language in Croatia
- Italian language in Slovenia
- Dalmatia
- Italianization
- Croatisation
- Flight and expulsion of Germans (1944–50)
- Ethnic cleansing in the Bosnian War
- Niçard exodus

== Bibliography ==
- Alberto Moioli, Lorenzo Fontana, Esodo, personal exhibition by Paolo Terdich, Roma, Editions of Italian Modern and Contemporary Art Archives, 2025. ISBN 978-88-947049-8-3
- Begonja, Zlatko (July 2005). "Iza obzorja pobjede, Sudski procesi "narodnim neprijateljima" u Zadru 1944.-1946" [Beyond horizon of victory, Trials of "enemies of the people" in Zadar 1944-1946]. Journal of Contemporary History (in Croatian). 37 (1). Croatian Institute of History: 71–82. ISSN 0590-9597.
- Ivetic, Egidio (2022). Povijest Jadrana: More i njegove civilizacije [History of the Adriatic: A Sea and Its Civilization] (in Croatian and English). Srednja Europa, Polity Press. ISBN 9789538281747.
- A Brief History of Istria by Darko Darovec
- Raoul Pupo, Il lungo esodo. Istria: le persecuzioni, le foibe, l'esilio, Rizzoli, 2005. ISBN 88-17-00562-2.
- Raoul Pupo and Roberto Spazzali, Foibe, Mondadori, 2003. ISBN 88-424-9015-6.
- Guido Rumici, Infoibati, Mursia, Milano, 2002. ISBN 88-425-2999-0.
- Arrigo Petacco, L'esodo. La tragedia negata degli italiani d'Istria, Dalmazia e Venezia Giulia, Mondadori, Milano, 1999. English translation.
- Marco Girardo, Sopravvissuti e dimenticati: il dramma delle foibe e l'esodo dei giuliano-dalmati. Paoline, 2006.
- Seton-Watson, Christopher (1967). Italy from Liberalism to Fascism, 1870–1925. Methuen & Co.
- Tomasevich, Jozo (October 2002). War and Revolution in Yugoslavia, 1941-1945: Occupation and Collaboration. Stanford University Press. ISBN 978-0-8047-7924-1.

=== Further reading ===
- Pamela Ballinger, "The Politics of the Past: Redefining Insecurity along the 'World's Most Open Border'"
- Matjaž Klemenčič, "The Effects of the Dissolution of Yugoslavia on Minority Rights: the Italian Minority in Post-Yugoslav Slovenia and Croatia"
- (in Italian) Site of an association of Italian exiles from Istria and Dalmatia
- Slovene-Italian Relations 1880–1956 Report 2000
- (in Italian) Relazioni Italo-Slovene 1880–1956 Relazione 2000
- (in Slovene) Slovensko-italijanski odnosi 1880–1956 Poročilo 2000
- Italians mark war massacre
- Monzali, Luciano (2016). "A Difficult and Silent Return: Italian Exiles from Dalmatia and Yugoslav Zadar/Zara after the Second World War". Balcanica (47): 317–328. doi:10.2298/BALC1647317M. hdl:11586/186368.
