= Moioli =

Moioli is an Italian surname. Notable people with the surname include:

- Alberto Moioli (born 1968), Italian art critic, writer and curator
- Ezio Moioli (1902–1981), Italian painter
- Giuseppe Moioli (1927–2025), Italian Olympic rower
- Michela Moioli (born 1995), Italian Olympic snowboarder
