= Paolo Terdich =

Italian painter

- Born: 1960 (age 65–66); Piacenza, Italy
- Known for: Painting
- Notable work: painter

Paolo Terdich (born 1960) is an Italian painter. A contemporary, from hyperrealism to dream, far from academic formalisms, he deals with the national civil commemoration, the National Memorial Day of the Exiles and Foibe.

== Biography ==
Terdich was born in 1960 in Piacenza. He was born to a family from Rijeka, overwhelmed in the post-war period by the Istrian–Dalmatian exodus, a historical event also known as the Istrian exodus. His highly expressive, landscape-based, intimate and sentimental pictorial path has emerged over time, becoming known especially since the 2000s, through exhibitions at the Italian Cultural Institute in Cairo, in 2002 at the Town Hall of Sauze d'Oulx, in 2004 in Holland at the American Women Cultural Association and from 2008 to 2009 in Piacenza in Atelier d'Arte in 2012. and at the Spazio Rosso Tiziano in 2015 and 2018. Since 2010, Terdich has held several solo exhibitions abroad, from the italian Embassy in Nigeria, to the solo exhibitions in Berlin in 2019 and New York City in 2022, and was subsequently invited to the LIX Venice Biennale 2022 national pavilion of Grenada. The essays were edited by Paolo Levi, Elisa Manzoni, Daniele Radini Tedeschi, Alfredo Pasolino and Alberto Moioli.

Since 2023 he has been presenting a long-considered artistic project, the Ricordo delle Foibe, Julian-Dalmatian exodus, focusing on figurative art in contemporary aesthetics existing in allegorical context with the new generations and to pursue a tribute to lived memory, with a first exhibition in Palazzo Galli, Sala Panini of Banca di Piacenza in 2024. Exhibits in Rome at the exhibition Exodus, lest we forget, in the Sala del Cenacolo of the Vicolo Valdina Complex of the Chamber of Deputies (Italy) in February 2025, an event desired by Lorenzo Fontana, President of the Chamber of Deputies. The exhibition was curated by the Paolo Salvati Archive, with the presentation of Federico Mollicone and an essay by Alberto Moioli.

== Bibliography ==
- Alberto Moioli, Lorenzo Fontana, Esodo, personal exhibition by Paolo Terdich, Roma, Editions of Italian Modern and Contemporary Art Archives, English and French languages, 2025. ISBN 978-88-947049-8-3
- Alberto Moioli, Enciclopedia d'Arte Italiana, Catalogo Generale Artisti dal Novecento ad oggi, Milan, 2025. ISBN 978-88-947879-9-3
- Stefania Pieralice, Atlante dell'Arte Contemporanea, Edizioni Giunti, 2024, Milan. ISBN 978-88-511989-8-5
- Alberto Moioli, personal exhibition by Paolo Terdich, AQUA, Ventura Gallery, New York, 2022, Editions of Italian Modern and Contemporary Art Archives, Roma. ISBN 979-12-82182-08-9
- Catalogo d'Arte Moderna n.50, Gli Artisti Italiani dal Primo Novecento ad Oggi, 2021, Arnoldo Mondadori Editore, Milan. ISBN 978-88-6052-572-7
- Catalogo d'Arte Moderna n.49, Gli Artisti Italiani dal Primo Novecento ad Oggi, 2020, Arnoldo Mondadori Editore, Milan. ISBN 978-88-6052-515-4
- Catalogo d'Arte Moderna n.48, Gli Artisti Italiani dal Primo Novecento ad Oggi, 2019, Arnoldo Mondadori Editore, Milan. ISBN 978-88-6052-459-1
- Alberto Moioli, Patrizia Mazzei, Susanna Gualazzini, personal exhibition by Paolo Terdich, Due mondi a confronto, Von Zeidler Art Gallery, Berlin, 2019, Editions of Italian Modern and Contemporary Art Archives. ISBN 979-12-82182-09-6
- Catalog Paintings by Contemporary Artists, 2012, Fine Arts Museum of San Francisco. ISBN 978-1-4521-1264-0
- International Contemporary Artists Volume V, 2012, Eve Lemonidou; First Edition. ISBN 978-6188000711
- Daniele Radini Tedeschi, L'Esausta Clessidra, 2011, Editions of Rosa dei Venti.
- Catalogo d'Arte Moderna n.41, Gli Artisti Italiani dal Primo Novecento ad Oggi, 2005, Arnoldo Mondadori Editore, Milan. ISBN 88-6052-000-2
