= Italian language in Slovenia =

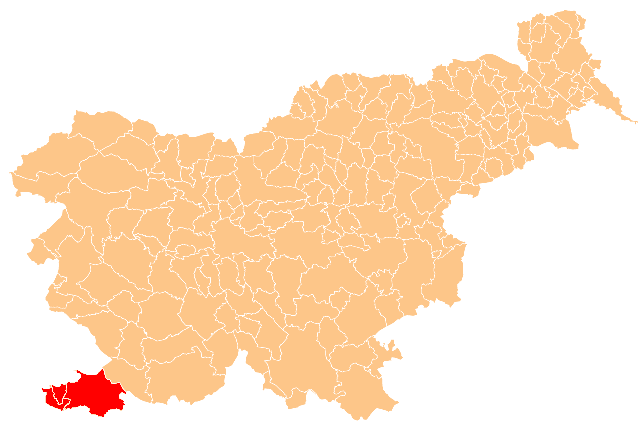
Marked in red, the municipalities in which the Italian language is co-official.

The Italian language is an officially recognized minority language in Slovenia, along with Hungarian. Around 3,700 Slovenian citizens speak Italian as their mother tongue, mostly Istrian Italians. Their numbers drastically decreased following the Istrian–Dalmatian exodus (1943–1960). Italian has a strong presence in Slovenia, both historical and current. An estimated 15% of Slovenians speak Italian as a second language, which is one of the highest percentages in the European Union.

== History ==
Between the Late Middle Ages and 1797, part of the territory of the Slovenian Istria (almost entirely corresponding to the current municipalities of Koper, Izola and Piran) was under Venetian rule. During that period, the population of the coastal area, which had spoken various Romance dialects (either of Rhaeto-Romance or Istriot origin) adopted the Venetian language. Koper/Capodistria was an important centre of art and culture during the Italian Renaissance. During Austrian rule, which lasted until 1918, Italian was the official language of these areas, along with German. Only in the late 19th century, Slovene became co-official, but only in those rural areas where there was a Slovene ethnic majority.

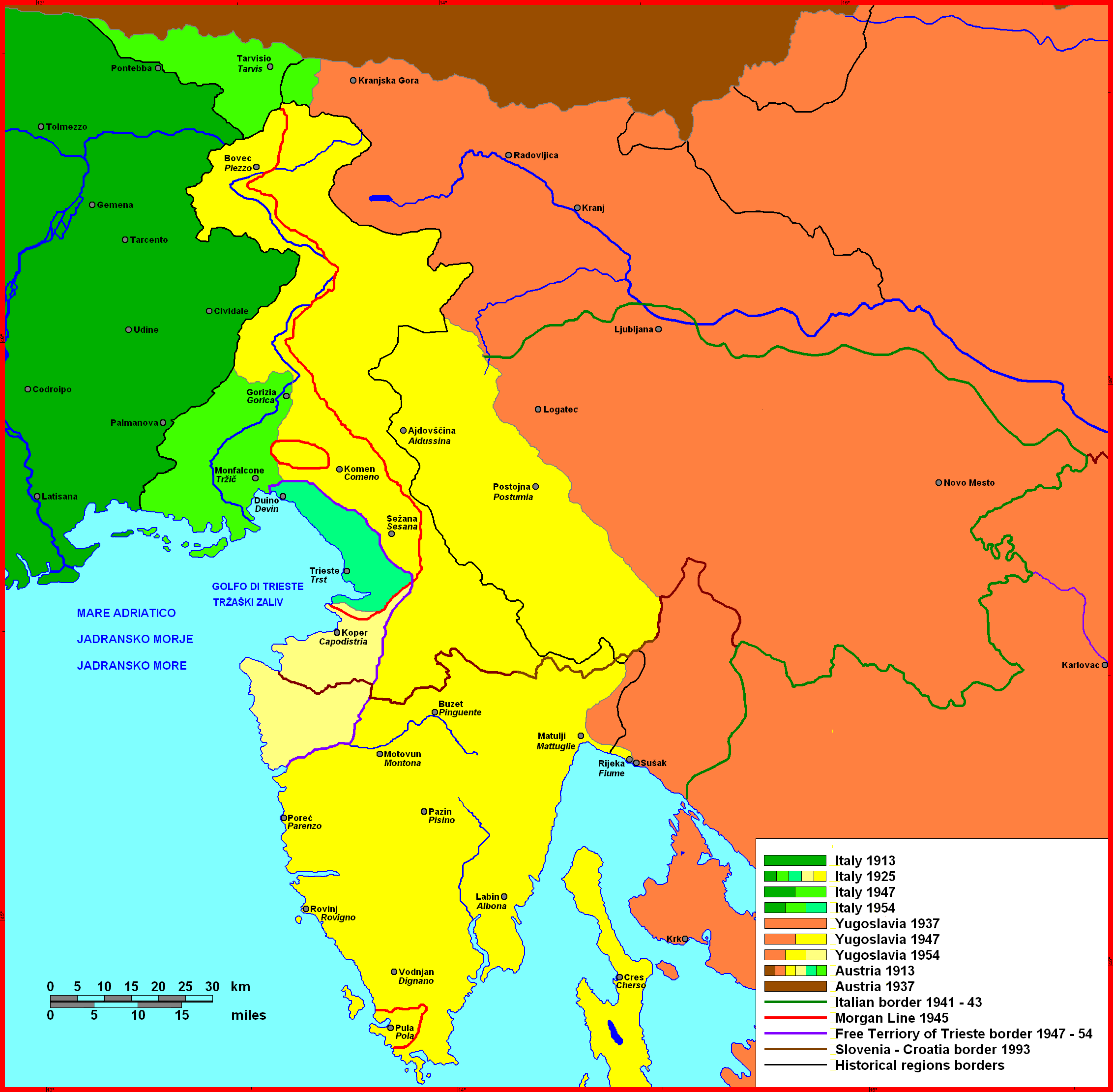
Changes to the Italian eastern border from 1920 to 1975. The Austrian Littoral, later renamed Julian March, which was assigned to Italy in 1920 with the Treaty of Rapallo (with adjustments of its border in 1924 after the Treaty of Rome) and which was then ceded to Yugoslavia in 1947 with the Treaty of Paris Areas annexed to Italy in 1920 and remained Italian even after 1947 Areas annexed to Italy in 1920, passed to the Free Territory of Trieste in 1947 with the Paris treaties and definitively assigned to Italy in 1975 with the Treaty of Osimo Areas annexed to Italy in 1920, passed to the Free Territory of Trieste in 1947 with the Paris treaties and definitively assigned to Yugoslavia in 1975 with the Osimo treaty

During Austrian rule many Istrian Italians looked with sympathy towards the Risorgimento movement that fought for the unification of Italy. However, after the Third Italian War of Independence (1866), when the Veneto and Friuli regions were ceded by the Austrians to the newly formed Kingdom Italy, Istria remained part of the Austro-Hungarian Empire, together with other Italian-speaking areas on the eastern Adriatic. This triggered the gradual rise of Italian irredentism among many Italians in Istria, who demanded the unification of Istria with Italy. The Italians in Istria supported the Italian Risorgimento: as a consequence, the Austrians saw the Italians as enemies and favored the Slav communities of Istria, fostering the nascent nationalism of Slovenes and Croats.

During the meeting of the Council of Ministers of 12 November 1866, Emperor Franz Joseph I of Austria outlined a wide-ranging project aimed at the Germanization or Slavization of the areas of the empire with an Italian presence:

His Majesty expressed the precise order that action be taken decisively against the influence of the Italian elements still present in some regions of the Crown and, appropriately occupying the posts of public, judicial, masters employees as well as with the influence of the press, work in South Tyrol, Dalmatia and Littoral for the Germanization and Slavization of these territories according to the circumstances, with energy and without any regard. His Majesty calls the central offices to the strong duty to proceed in this way to what has been established.

— Franz Joseph I of Austria, Council of the Crown of 12 November 1866

There are some claims, Istrian Italians were more than 50% of the total population of Istria for centuries, while making up about a third of the population in 1900. According to the last Austrian census of 1910, of the around 75,000 inhabitants of Slovenian Istria, around 30,000 or 40% spoke Italian as their native language, while 60% spoke Slovene. Taken only the three municipalities of Koper, Izola and Piran (in their current border), the figures are 27,728 (80,81%) Italian speakers vs. 6,584 (19,18%) Slovene speakers (1,669 other languages, 4,98%). There was a big linguistic divide among the urban population and the rural areas: the towns were almost exclusively Italian speaking, while the rural areas had a large Slovene majority. Within the current borders of the municipality of Koper, 87% of the urban population was Italian speaking, while in its predominantly rural surroundings, they represented the 22,3% of the population. In Izola, Italian speakers amounted to 97% in the town, but only 12,8% in the surroundings. Only in the Piran municipality, they had a majority both in the urban and rural areas, with 95,9% and 64%, respectively.

After World War I, the entire Slovenian Littoral was annexed to Italy. During Fascism, a policy of Italianization was pursued, and all public use of Slovene was banished throughout the region. After World War Two, these areas were annexed to Socialist Yugoslavia, and the vast majority of the Italian-speaking population of the coastal town was either expelled by the Communist regime or decided to flee to Italy, in what became known as the Istrian–Dalmatian exodus. Only about a tenth of the Italian-speaking population remained. However, due to international and bilateral agreements that followed the change in administration of the Free Territory of Trieste, they were granted linguistic rights, and the entire territory of their traditional settlement became bilingual.

== Geographic distribution and population ==
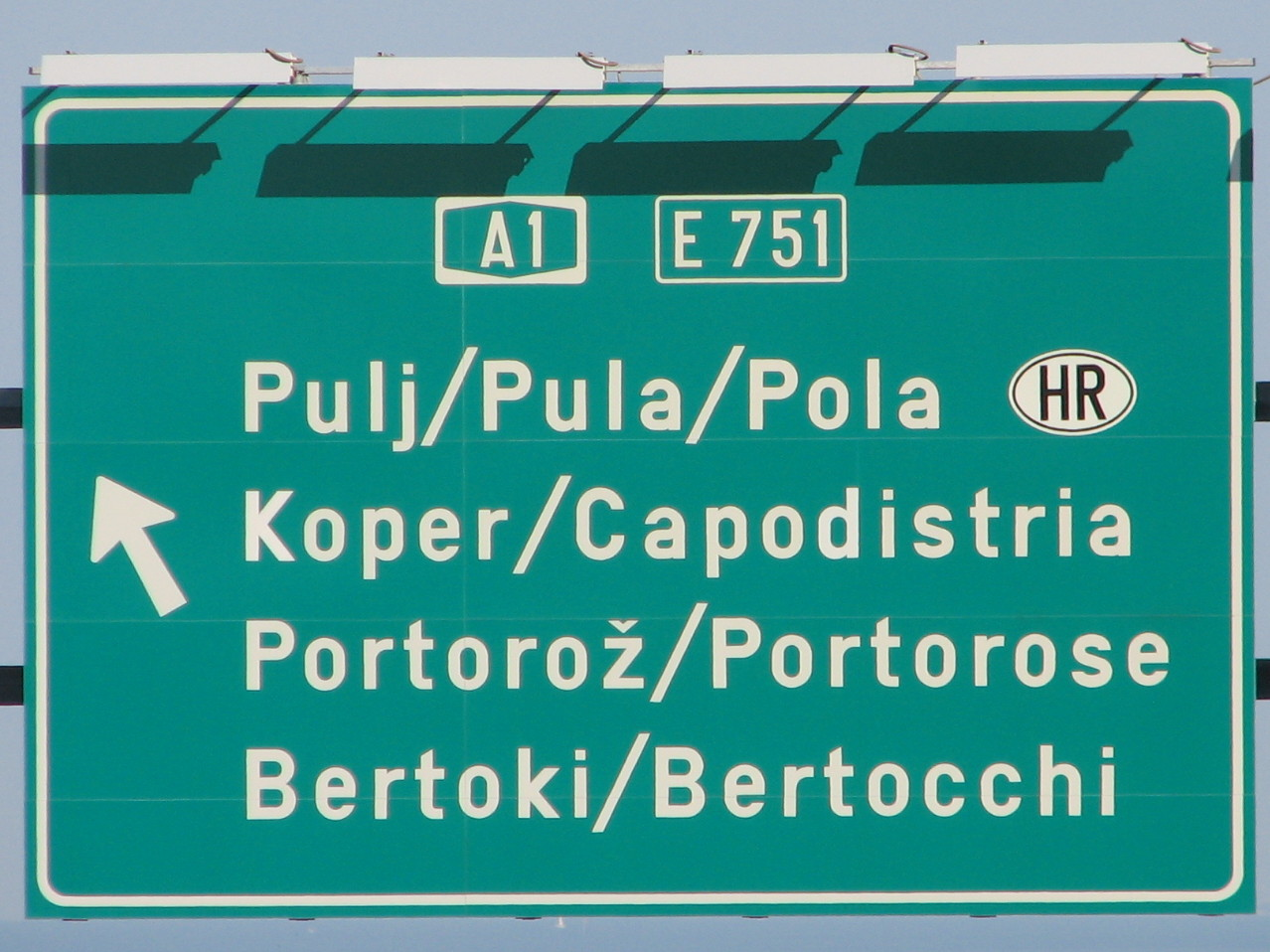
A multilingual sign in Slovenian and Italian (also partly in Croatian) near Koper/Capodistria.

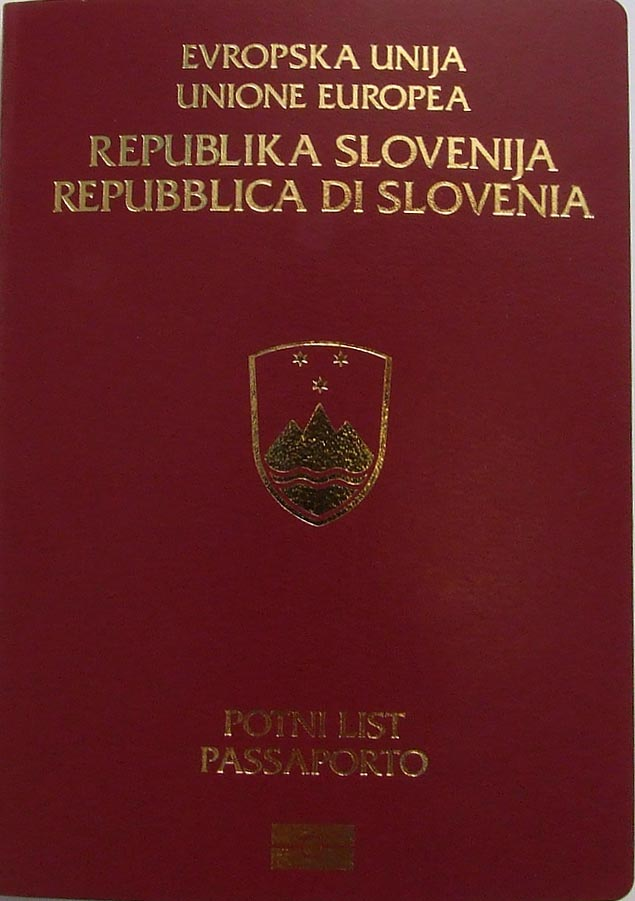
Bilingual, Slovene-Italian, issue of the Slovenian passport

Italian is co-official with Slovene in four municipalities in the Slovenian portion of Istria: Piran (Italian: Pirano), Koper (Italian: Capodistria), Izola (Italian: Isola d'Istria) and Ankaran (Italian: Ancarano). The official census, carried out in 2002, reported 2,258 ethnic Italians in the country (0.11% of the total population). However, 3,762 people (0.2% of the total population and a slight dip from the number in the 1991 census) reported themselves to be mother tongue speakers of the language, of whom 1,832 declared themselves as being ethnic Italian, 1,195 as ethnic Slovenes, 34 as Croats, and 37 belonged to an ethnicity that was not listed.

Of the total 3,762 Italian native speakers in Slovenia, 2,853 live in one of the three municipalities where it is co-official: 1,174 in Piran, 1,059 in Koper, and 620 in Izola. Around 15% of all Slovenians speak Italian as a second language, which is the highest percentage in the European Union after Malta. An estimated 5% of Slovenians use Italian in their daily life, which is the highest percentage in the European Union outside Italy. The vast majority of those live in the Slovenian Littoral, where daily economic and personal contacts with neighboring Italy are common.

== Usage of Italian ==
According to the Slovenian constitution, the Italian language is co-official in the areas of Slovenian Istria where the Italian people have been traditionally present as an autochthonous population. According to law, all official signs are to be written in both languages, as should all public notifications. Italian is to be used in all public offices in the bilingual area. Italian can be used in the municipal assemblies of Koper, Izola and Piran, although in practice almost all discussions are carried out in Slovene.

== Education and Italian language ==
Beside Slovene language schools, there are also kindergartens, primary schools, lower secondary schools and upper secondary schools with Italian as the language of instruction in Koper/Capodistria, Izola/Isola and Piran/Pirano. At the state-owned University of Primorska, however, which is also established in the bilingual area, Slovene is the only language of instruction (although the official name of the university includes the Italian version, too).

== See also ==
- Italian language in Croatia
- Istrian Italians
- Istrian–Dalmatian exodus
