= Alexander Kanevsky =

American painter (1959–2025)

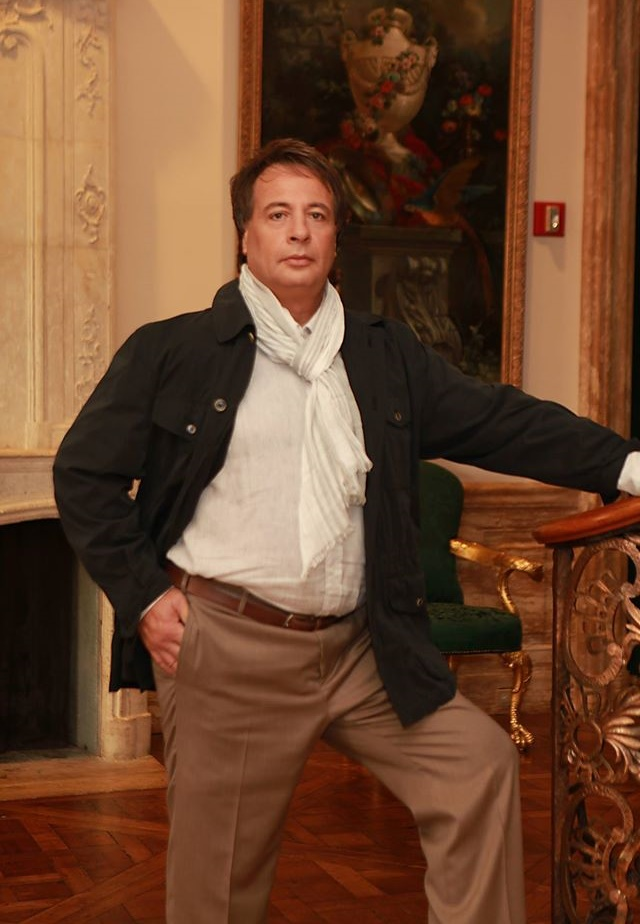
- Kanevsky in 2015
- Born: 1959; Tula, Russian SFSR, Soviet Union
- Died: July 28, 2025 (aged 65); Langhorne Borough, Pennsylvania, U.S.
- Known for: Painting
- Notable work: Painter, sculptor

Alexander Kanevsky (1959 – August 11, 2025) was a Russian-born American painter and sculptor.

== Life and career ==
Alexander Kanevsky approached the figurative arts at a young age, painting and sculpture with a strong expression coinciding with his oncology studies, he painted and sculpted the human body in its forms and sufferings. He identified the intellectual tumors of contemporary society, an example of a writer of mythological and intimate art. He also interpreted his works as an actor, he identified with the characters created for his works of art. International art critics and historians have written about him, such as Vittorio Sgarbi, Paolo Levi, Alberto Moioli, and many others, published periodically in various biographical art publications in the sector, which highlight his artistic path which is identified in a personal new Renaissance. Known and cited in recent years also by the historic Italian artistic reality, Cento Pittori via Margutta, and on the art volume Enciclopedia d'Arte Italiana, Catalogo Generale Artisti dal Novecento ad oggi. Kanevsky died on August 11, 2025, at the age of 65.

== Museums ==
- Museum, Fondazione Cassamarca of Treviso.

== International exhibitions ==
- 2002: Personal exhibition in Russia, at the former Lenin Museum in Krasnoyarsk.
- 2004: Personal exhibition in Nairobi.
- 2005: Personal exhibition in New Delhi.
- 2013: Otto sguardi d’autore, Museo d'arte e scienza, Milan.
- 2015: La Forza dell’Immagine, mostra su Alexander Kanevsky, Monreale.
- 2017: Nuovo Rinascimento, opere recenti di Alexander Kanevsky, Palazzo Ducale, Sabbioneta.
- 2017: Deus sive Natura. Riflessioni spirituali di ecologia umana sulle opere di Alexander Kanevsky, Palazzo Grifoni (San Miniato).
- 2023: Nuovo Rinascimento, Ca' dei Carraresi, exhibition by Alexander Kanevsky.
- 2024: Otto sguardi d'autore, Museo d'arte e scienza, Milan.

== Bibliography ==
- Enciclopedia d'Arte Italiana, Catalogo Generale Artisti dal Novecento ad oggi, 2013, Alberto Moioli.
- Monograph, Kanevsky, La forza dell'immagine, 2016, EA editions, Palermo.
- Catalogo dell’Arte Moderna n.52, Giovanni Faccenda, “Gli Artisti Italiani dal Primo Novecento ad Oggi”, Giorgio Mondadori, Milan, 2016, pp. 66–380-381. ISBN 978-88-6052-751-6
- Enciclopedia d'Arte Italiana, Catalogo Generale Artisti dal Novecento ad oggi, 2016, Alberto Moioli.
- Enciclopedia d'Arte Italiana, Catalogo Generale Artisti dal Novecento ad oggi, 2024, Alberto Moioli. ISBN 978-88-947879-0-0
- Monograph, Alexander Kanevsky, Alberto Moioli, 2024, Editions of Italian Modern and Contemporary Art Archives, Rome. ISBN 978-88-947049-3-8
- Alberto Moioli, Enciclopedia d'Arte Italiana, Catalogo Generale Artisti dal Novecento ad oggi, Milan, 2025. ISBN 978-88-947879-9-3
