= Emidio De Felice =

Italian linguist and lexicographer

Emidio De Felice (1918–1993) was an Italian linguist and lexicographer.

== Life ==
He was born in Milan in 1918. He became a university professor in 1963, teaching linguistics at the University of Genoa. Author of Italian language dictionaries, grammar books and Latin anthologies, he is mainly known for his research on Italian onomastics. He died in Genoa in 1993.

== Works ==
- La pronuncia del latino classico, Arona (Varese), Ed. Paideia, 1948.
- Grammaticae principia : corso di latino per la scuola media, Palermo, Palumbo, 1960.
- La preposizione italiana "a", Florence, Sansoni, 1960.
- La romanizzazione dell'estremo Sud d'Italia, Florence, L. S. Olschki, 1962.
- Le coste della Sardegna : saggio toponomastico storico-descrittivo, Cagliari, Ed. Sarda Fossataro, 1964.
- Dizionario della lingua e della civiltà italiana contemporanea, coautore Aldo Duro, Palermo, Palumbo, 1974.
- Dizionario dei cognomi italiani, Milan, A. Mondadori, 1978.
- I cognomi italiani : rilevamenti quantitativi dagli elenchi telefonici: informazioni socioeconomiche e culturali, onomastiche e linguistiche, Bologna, il Mulino, 1980.
- I nomi degli italiani. Informazioni onomastiche e linguistiche socioculturali e religiose. Rilevamenti quantitativi dei nomi personali dagli elenchi telefonici, Rome, SARIN, Venice, Marsilio Editori, 1982. ISBN 88-317-5082-8
- Le parole d'oggi : il lessico quotidiano, religioso, intellettuale, politico, economico, scientifico, dell'arte e dei media, Milan, A. Mondadori, 1984.
- Dizionario dei nomi italiani : origine, etimologia, storia, diffusione e frequenza di oltre 18000 nomi, Milan, A. Mondadori, 1986.
- Nomi e cultura : riflessi della cultura italiana dell'Ottocento e del Novecento nei nomi personali, Venice, Marsilio, 1987. ISBN 88-317-5026-7.
- Dizionario critico dei sinonimi italiani, Venice, Marsilio, 1991. ISBN 88-317-5412-2.
- Vocabolario italiano, coautore Aldo Duro, Turin, Società editrice internazionale; Palermo, Palumbo, 1993. ISBN 88-05-05297-3.

== Bibliography ==
- Enrica Salvaneschi: Ricordo di Emidio De Felice (1918–1993). In: Quaderni della Sezione di Glottologia e Linguistica 5, 1993 (gefolgt von: Bibliografia di Emidio De Felice)
- Emidio De Felice (1918–1993) e l'onomastica. Contributi inediti, rari e sparsi, a cura di Enzo Caffarelli e Rita Caprini. In: Rivista Italiana di Onomastica. 9, 2003, pp. 101–290
