= Aldo Duro =

Dalmatian Italian linguist and lexicographer

- Born: 25 January 1916; Zara, Kingdom of Dalmatia, Austria-Hungary (today Zadar, Croatia)
- Died: 11 July 2000 (aged 84); Rome, Italy
- Awards: Italian Medal of Merit for Culture and Art

Aldo Duro (25 January 1916 – 11 July 2000) was a Dalmatian Italian linguist and lexicographer. He worked for both the Accademia della Crusca and the Istituto della Enciclopedia Italiana, of which he was director of the lexicography. Duro was also the director of the Italian Vocabulary.

== Biography ==
Aldo Duro was born on 25 January 1916 in Zara, in the Austro-Hungarian empire (today Zadar, Croatia).

Duro graduated from Pisa's Normale. He had the chance to study and work with such linguists as Michele Barbi and Bruno Migliorini. He collaborated with the latter on Prontuario etimologico della lingua italiana (1950). The same year, in 1950, he became a lexicographer at the Istituto della Enciclopedia Italiana. The lexicography published from 1955 to 1961 by the Treccani Institute is to be attributed to him. Initially he was the editor-in-chief of the lexical section of the Dizionaṅo Enciclopedico Italiano, and in 1970 he became the director and author of the Vocabolario della lingua italiana ("Vocabulary of the Italian language"). From 1964 to 1972 he was the director of the Vocabolario storico at the Accademia della Crusca.

Duro was one of the first Italian linguists to make use of "the new tools of linguistic analysis offered by computer science." In 1975 he published the Dizionario della lingua e della civiltà italiana contemporanea in collaboration with Emidio De Felice. Duro also published a work on Dalmatia and the extinct Dalmatian language.

He died in 2000 in Rome.

== Partial Bibliography ==
- Gabriele D'Annunzio, vate d'Italia, Zara, Tip. E. De Schonfeld, 1939.
- Linguistica e poetica del Tommaseo, Pisa-Rome, Vallerini, 1942.
- Immagini e ritmi: elementi di stilistica e metrica: per il ginnasio e le scuole medie superiori, Bari, L. Macri, 1947.
- Grammatica italiana: La formazione della Lingua, Turin: G. B. Paravia e C., 1950.
- Prontuario etimologico della lingua italiana, co-author Bruno Migliorini, Turin, Paravia, 1950.
- Dizionario della lingua e della civiltà italiana contemporanea, co-author Emidio De Felice, Palermo, Palumbo, 1974.
- Vocabolario italiano, co-author Emidio De Felice, Turin, Società editrice internazionale - Palermo, Palumbo, 1993.
