= Alberto Moioli =

Italian art critic

- Born: February 19, 1968 (age 58); Monza
- Occupations: Art critic, writer
- Known for: Enciclopedia d'arte italiana
- Website: www.albertomoioli.it

Alberto Moioli, (Monza, 19 February 1968), is an Italian art critic, writer and curator. He is the editorial director of the Enciclopedia d'arte italiana.

== Research and curation ==
Moioli has placed a particular emphasis on the work of Italian painters from modern and contemporary art. Initially a journalist, in 2003 he become a member of A.I.C.A. International Association of Art Critics since 2016. He has curated numerous contemporary exhibitions and is the editorial director of the Enciclopedia d'arte italiana in Milan. Since 2019 he has collaborated with the Archivio Paolo Salvati.

== Works ==
- Enciclopedia d’Arte Italiana, General catalog of artists from 900 to today, n.1, Milan, 2012.
- Enciclopedia d’Arte Italiana, General catalog of artists from 900 to today, n.2, Milan, 2013.
- Enciclopedia d’Arte Italiana, General catalog of artists from 900 to today, n.3, Milan, 2014.
- Enciclopedia d’Arte Italiana, General catalog of artists from 900 to today, n.4, Milan, 2015.
- Enciclopedia d’Arte Italiana, General catalog of artists from 900 to today, n.5, Milan, 2016.
- Enciclopedia d’Arte Italiana, General catalog of artists from 900 to today, n.6, Milan, 2017.ISBN 978-88-941191-2-1.
- Enciclopedia d’Arte Italiana, General catalog of artists from 900 to today, n.7, Milan, 2018.
- Enciclopedia d’Arte Italiana, General catalog of artists from 900 to today, n.8, Milan, 2019.
- Enciclopedia d’Arte Italiana, General catalog of artists from 900 to today, n.9, Milan, 2020.ISBN 978-88-941191-4-5.
- Enciclopedia d’Arte Italiana, General catalog of artists from 900 to today, n.9 (bis), Milan, 2021.ISBN 978-88-941191-5-2.
- Monograph, Alexander Kanevsky, Alberto Moioli, 2024, Editions of Italian Modern and Contemporary Art Archives, Rome. ISBN 978-88-947049-3-8
- Catalog, I luoghi dello Spirito, I volti dell’anima di Luigi Salvatori, 2024, Editions of Italian Modern and Contemporary Art Archives, Rome.ISBN 978-88-947049-3-8
- Catalog, Connessioni Cromatiche, Editions of italian and contemporary art archives, Artiglio Association, by Riccardo Zancano, Chiesa di Sant'Orsola, 2025. ISBN 979-12-82182-01-0
- Catalog, Esodo, personal exhibition by Paolo Terdich, Roma, Editions of Italian Modern and Contemporary Art Archives, English and French languages, 2025. ISBN 978-88-947049-8-3
