= Cristoforo Russo =

Italian contemporary painter (1976–2024)

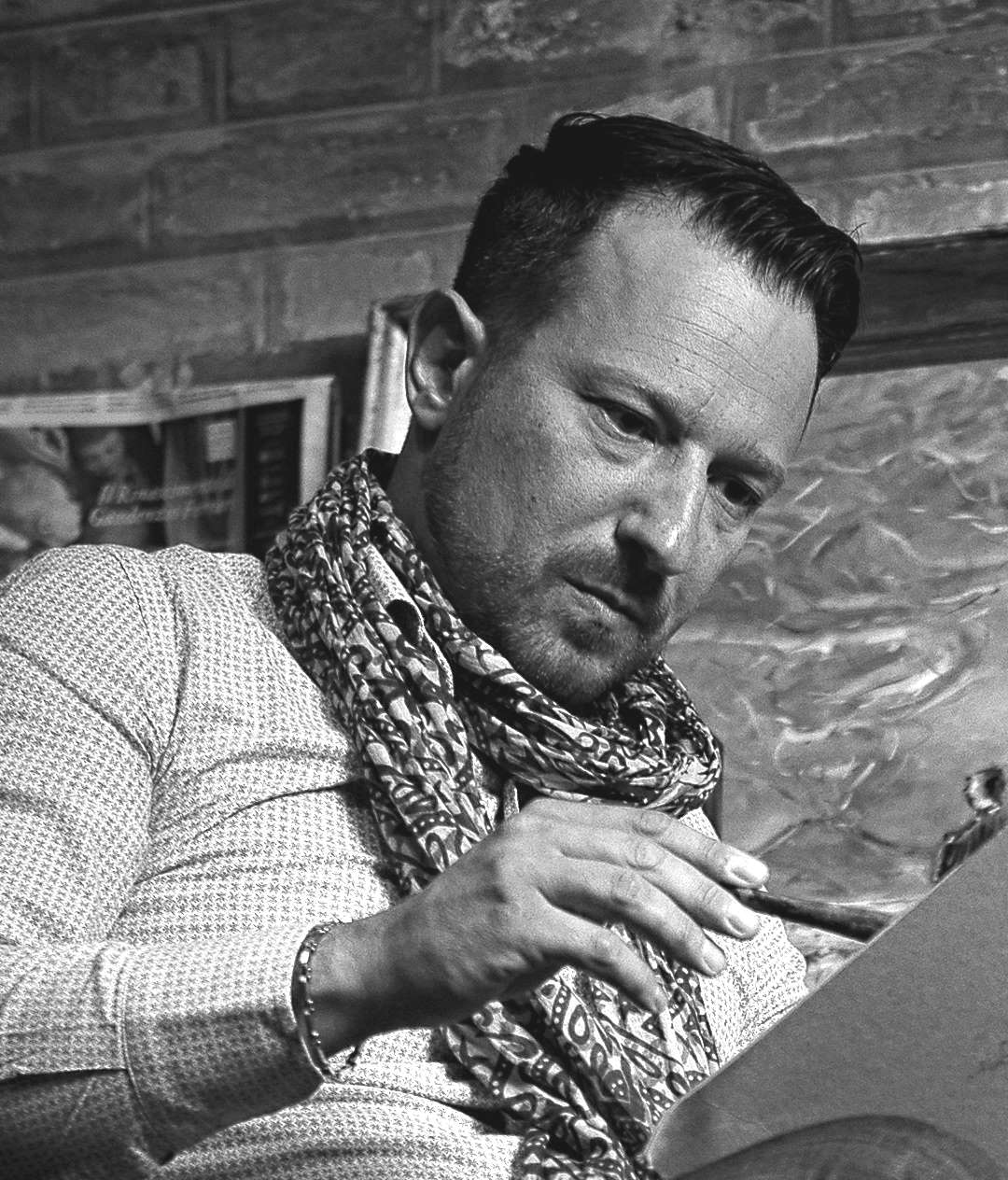
- Born: 1978; Torre del Greco, Italy
- Died: April 15, 2024 (aged 45)
- Known for: Painting

Cristoforo Russo (1978 – 15 April 2024) was an Italian contemporary painter.

== Biography ==
Cristoforo Russo was born in Torre del Greco, a town near Naples. Studies traditional landscape architects, elaborates a personal style, uses a warm and balanced palette. Journalist and lover of popular culture, he combines theatrical training with internationalist academic training, which lead him to paint during his long travels. He exhibited in the colors of the world at the Arianna Cultural Center in 2016, at the VibrAzioni Art Festival exhibition in 2017, at the 2nd contemporary art exhibition at the Civic Museum Striano. In 2019, he received the New York award Lecce, in “In love with Culture” by Manhattan Transfer from the Castrimeniense Academy to the "Mastroianni" Civic Museum. The first 2019 solo exhibition at the Moroni Library, in Porto Recanati.

In 2020 he participated in the Dantebus bazart painting competition in Milan, and in the Free Emotions with Karen Thomas curated by the Arte in Regola gallery in 2020 Rome. In 2021, he exhibited at Bastione San Giacomo Brindisi, with the project Manhattan Transfer. Participate in the 115th Exhibition of Cento Pittori via Margutta, 2021. He exhibits in one person in 2021, by title Controvento, in 2022 with Manhattan Transfer near Santa Maria dei Miracoli and Santa Maria in Montesanto and in 2023 Un Presepe Pop in Venanzo Crocetti Museum.

He has joined the Gruppo Arte Purificato directed by Giuseppe Purificato and Francesco Zero, and is published in the Enciclopedia d'Arte Italiana, Catalogo Generale Artisti dal Novecento ad oggi and the National Gallery Archive.

In 2024, he was invited to the exhibition curated by the art historian Michela Ramadori, Frontier art: expressing and representing disability. A selection of works from the Paolo Salvati Archive Collection and other collections, Rome, Borromini salon, Biblioteca Vallicelliana.

He died on 15 April 2024, at the age of 45.

== See also ==
- Luigi Salvatori

== Bibliography ==
- Monograph, Crontrovento, Napoli, Cristoforo Russo, by Cristoforo Palomba, Edizioni Scientifiche e Artistiche, 2021. ISBN 978-88-99742-67-6
- Alberto Moioli, Enciclopedia d'Arte Italiana, Catalogo Generale Artisti dal Novecento ad oggi, Milan, 2022. ISBN 978-88-941191-9-0
- Exhibition Catalog, Manhattan transfer, personal exhibition Cristoforo Russo, by Rosario Pinto, Rome, Edizioni Scientifiche e Artistiche, 2022. ISBN 978-88-99742-65-2
- Alberto Moioli, Enciclopedia d'Arte Italiana, Catalogo Generale Artisti dal Novecento ad oggi, Milan, 2022. ISBN 978-88-941191-9-0
- Luigi Salvatori, Storia dei Cento Pittori Via Margutta, primo volume storico documentale, vol.1, Rome, 2022. ISBN 979-12-80434-08-1
- Exhibition Catalog, by Rosario Pinto, Cristoforo Russo, Un Presepe PoP, Museo Venanzio Crocetti, Editions of Italian Modern and Contemporary Art Archives, Roma, 2023. ISBN 978-88-947049-5-2
- Luigi Salvatori, 117ª Mostra Cento Pittori via Margutta, Rome, 2023. ISBN 979-12-80434-12-8
- Alberto Moioli, Enciclopedia d'Arte Italiana, Catalogo Generale Artisti dal Novecento ad oggi, vol.11, Milan, 2023.
- Alberto Moioli, Enciclopedia d'Arte Italiana, Catalogo Generale Artisti dal Novecento ad oggi, Milan, 2024. ISBN 978-88-947879-0-0
- Michela Ramadori, Arte di frontiera: esprimere e rappresentare la disabilità. Una selezione di opere della Collezione Archivio Paolo Salvati e di altre raccolte, Rome, 2024. ISBN 978-88-947049-1-4
