= Via Margutta =

Street in Rome, Italy

Coordinates: 41°54′32″N 12°28′45″E

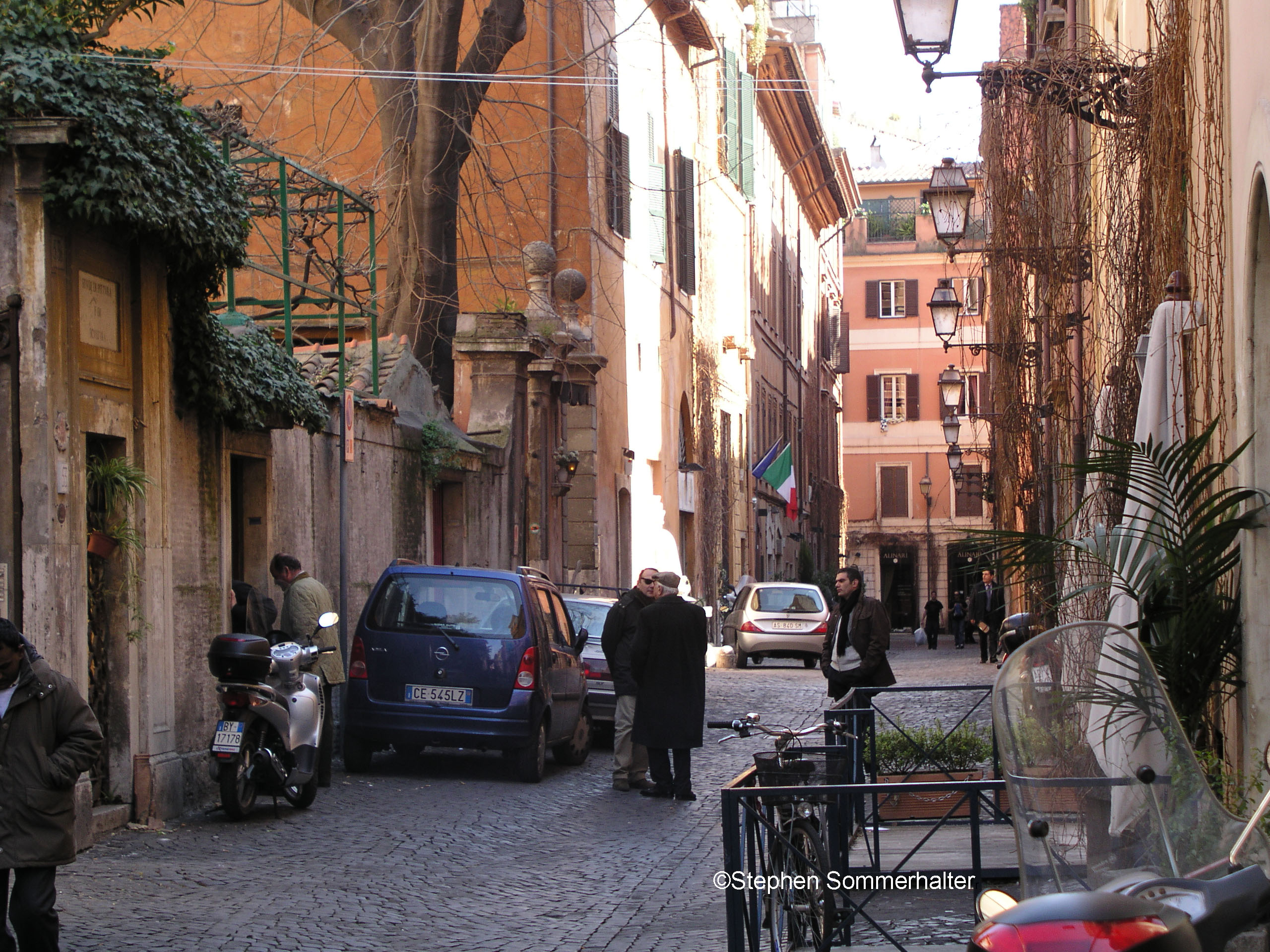
Via Margutta, looking southward toward the Spanish Steps

Via Margutta is a narrow street in the centre of Rome, near Piazza del Popolo, accessible from Via del Babuino in the ancient Campo Marzio neighborhood also known as "the foreigner's quarter". Mount Pincio is nearby. Via Margutta originally was home to modest craftsmen, workshops and stables, but now hosts many art galleries and fashionable restaurants.

After the 1953 film Roman Holiday became popular, Via Margutta developed into an exclusive neighborhood, where such celebrities as film director Federico Fellini lived. From the north the area can be reached from Via Cassia or Flaminia, passing then through Piazzale Flaminio, and through the city door in the wall that leads to Piazza del Popolo. From this point one walks several metres to the left of Flaminio Obelisk towards Via del Babuino, and on the left there is an alley that leads to Via Margutta.

From Piazza di Spagna, one can take via del Babuino, turn right on via Albert, and via Margutta will be on the left.

== Etymology and history ==
The name probably originates from the word "Marisgutta", meaning "Sea Drop", a gentle euphemism for a dirty stream that came down from the hill of the villa of the Pincii, used like a natural Roman Cloaca. Via Margutta was behind the palaces of Via del Babuino (Baboon road), where warehouses and stables were found.

At the base of Pincio hill, there were homes and shops of masons, marble cutters, and coachmen, who conducted their business in the areas. In the Middle Ages an unknown artist opened the first workshop where the finest Roman craftsmen painted portraits, cut marble for fountains and forged metal plates, giving birth to a flourishing industry that attracted foreign artists (including Flemish and German), as well as Italians from other regions. These immigrants gradually replaced the shacks and stables with houses, workshops and gardens.

During the reign of Pope Pius IX (1846–1878), a Belgian monsignor, Saverio de Merode, seeing the potential of the area, purchased land, built drains, and incorporated the narrow street into the public city plan.

Via Margutta today is a charming, quiet lane. Although it is fully in the city centre, it still maintains its garden atmosphere, perfumed by trees and vineyards, which has made it a perfect choice for artists, painters, sculptors, and antiquarians, even though many of former artists' studios have been converted into flats and apartments.

== Yearly exposition of "Associazione Cento Pittori via Margutta" ==
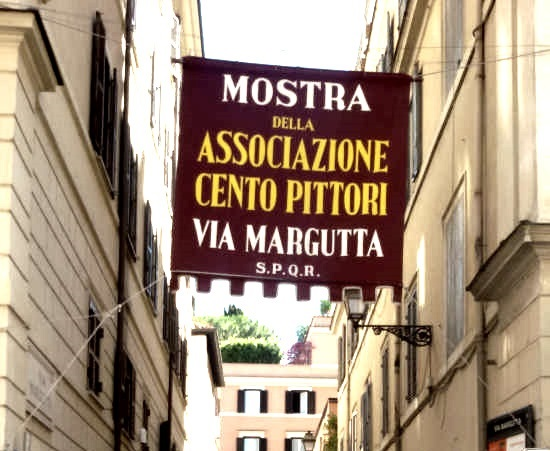
Cento Pittori via Margutta

Cento Pittori via Margutta, is a traditional festival of the arts that was born in 1953 in Rome. In 1970 the association that takes care of the historic exhibition was established. The expo is sponsored by the Mayor and the Province of Rome (Lazio), and for many years has been a burgeoning field for the discovery of new artists. Participated in the exhibition on the street, some painters known as Paolo Salvati, Gabriele Patriarca, Luigi Salvatori, Antonio Servillo, Generoso Pompa, and many others. Admission is free, the exposition is open to everybody, the viewing of the works is casual.

== Famous residents ==
Among the historical inhabitants of the street were Giulietta Masina, Federico Fellini, Renato Guttuso, Marina Punturieri, and Amerigo Tot.

== Fountain of the Arts ==
In the same area can be found the "Fontana delle Arti", which has a triangular base, crowned by a bucket of paint-brushes (symbolizing the presence of artists in the area dating from the 17th century). According to the project architect, Pietro Lombardi, who also designed other small "fontanelle" throughout Rome (usually inspired by the coats of arms of the ancient Roman quarter (rione), the marble fountain was carved in 1927. Two masks are on opposite sides, mounted over marble supports. The images are of the now familiar sad and happy faces, symbolizing the fluctuating moods typical of artists. The two carved faces pour their weak water streams into two small bathtubs.

== Popular culture ==
- Roman Holiday, a 1953 film by William Wyler starring Audrey Hepburn and Gregory Peck, portrays Peck's apartment as being on the street.
- My First Forty Years, 1987 film by Carlo Vanzina with Carol Alt and Elliott Gould.
- Quelle Belle Ragazze di Via Margutta (the directors, painters and writers who made the Rome of the 1950s the center of the World), 2004 book by Giampiero Mughini
- Via Margutta is mentioned in the song "Arrivederci Roma".

== Bibliography ==
- Via Margutta Storia della Strada degli Artisti e dei Cento Pittori, in Luigi Salvatori, Andrea Salvati, Antonio Servillo, Roberta Imperatori, Eventi d'Arte Cento Pittori via Margutta, Roma, 2021. ISBN 979-12-80434-03-6.

== See also ==
- Piazza del Popolo
- Via del Babuino
- Via del Corso
- Via di Ripetta
