= Barbara Berardicurti =

Italian painter

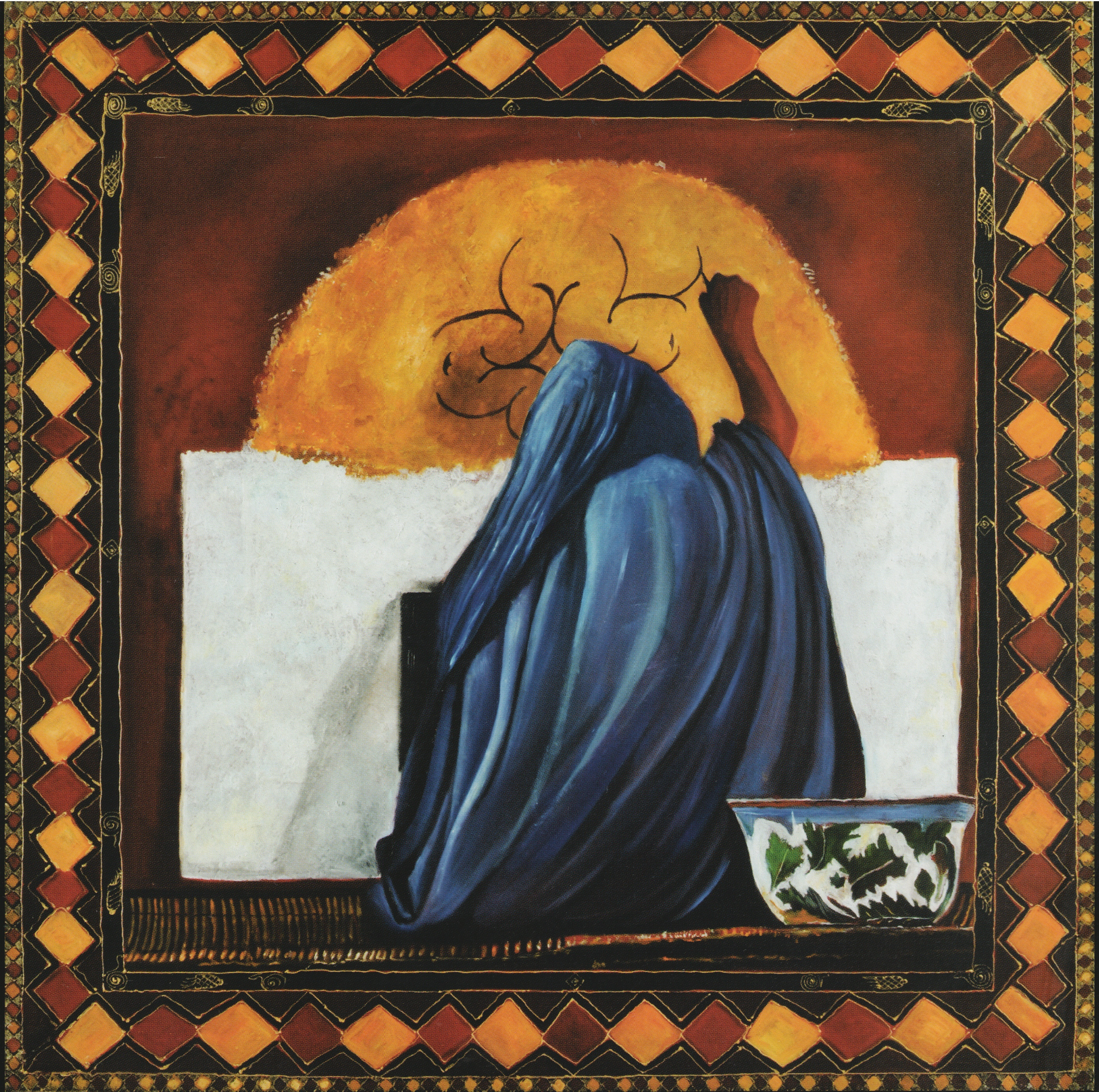
- Born: 1955 (age 70–71); Avezzano, Italy
- Known for: Painting
- Notable work: painter

Barbara Berardicurti (born 1955) is an Italian contemporary painter.

== Biography ==
Berardicurti graduated in painting and illustrations from the Istituto Europeo di Design in 1987 and attended various ateliers of contemporary artists and joined the historic artistic association Cento Pittori via Margutta in 1992. She creates landscapes and portraits inspired by her travels and life experiences, working primarily in oils but also in watercolors, acrylics, and pastels.

In 1994, together with other contemporary artists, she founded the association Alternativa '94 work in progres, with which she organized numerous exhibitions in Via Margutta, Via Giulia, and in various regions of Italy.

Since 2018 she has been the artistic director of the Pocket Art Studio exhibition center, in Via della Reginella of Rome. Since 2020 she has been cited in the dictionary of Enciclopedia d'Arte Italiana, Catalogo Generale Artisti dal Novecento ad oggi. Since 2012 he has exhibited in numerous international art fairs and solo exhibitions with the critical support of Alberto Moioli and Luigi Salvatori. Artistically he expresses himself through an intimate, authentic, highly expressive portraiture, not in tune with the trends of his period, he assimilates classic pictorial values with an interior vision through the portrait and the landscape. In the portrait, not a mirror reproduction of what we see but a personal experience, in the landscape a natural research where man is absent.

== Bibliography ==
- Annuario Arte Moderna artisti contemporanei 1997, ACCA in. Arte Editrice.
- Exhibition Catalog, Insieme per la solidarietà, Ospedale S. Giovanni Calibita-Isola Tiberina, Chiostro della Fontana, 14 novembre 2001.
- Exhibition Catalog, Omaggio al Pontificio Consiglio Justitia et Pax, 2004.
- Annuario Arte Moderna Artisti Contemporanei 2008, ACCA in. Arte Editrice.
- Exhibition Catalog, I Cento pittori di via Margutta ad H2Roma energy & mobility show, 2010.
- Exhibition Catalog, Molte mani un solo cuore per dar vita ad un sogno, Cento Pittori via Margutta, 2010.
- Catalog EuroExpoArt, Vernice Art Fair, Forlì, 2016.
- Catalog EuroExpoArt, Vernice Art Fair, Forlì, 2017.
- Catalog EuroExpoArt, Vernice Art Fair, Forlì, 2018.
- Annuario Arte Moderna artisti contemporanei 2018, ACCA in. Arte Editrice.
- Catalog EuroExpoArt, Vernice Art Fair, Forlì, 2019.
- Annuario Arte Moderna artisti contemporanei 2019, ACCA in. Arte Editrice.
- Alberto Moioli, Enciclopedia d'Arte Italiana, Catalogo Generale Artisti dal Novecento ad oggi, Milan, 2022. ISBN 978-88-941191-9-0
- Luigi Salvatori, Storia dei Cento Pittori Via Margutta, primo volume storico documentale, vol.1, Rome, 2022. ISBN 979-12-80434-08-1
- Alberto Moioli, Barbara Berardicurti, autentico e intimo authoritratto, Edizioni Cento Pittori, Rome, 2023. ISBN 979-12-80434-11-1
- Luigi Salvatori, 117ª Mostra Cento Pittori via Margutta, Rome, 2023. ISBN 979-12-80434-12-8
- Alberto Moioli, Enciclopedia d'Arte Italiana, Catalogo Generale Artisti dal Novecento ad oggi, vol.11, Milan, 2023.
- Alberto Moioli, Enciclopedia d'Arte Italiana, Catalogo Generale Artisti dal Novecento ad oggi, vol.12, Milan, 2024. ISBN 978-88-947879-0-0
- Alberto Moioli, Barbara Berardicurti, paesaggio intimo, Editions of Italian Modern and Contemporary Art Archives, Rome, 2024. ISBN 978-88-947049-6-9
- Michela Ramadori, Arte di frontiera: esprimere e rappresentare la disabilità. Una selezione di opere della Collezione Archivio Paolo Salvati e di altre raccolte, Rome, 2024. ISBN 978-88-947049-1-4
