= Antonello Spadafora =

Italian painter (born 1979)

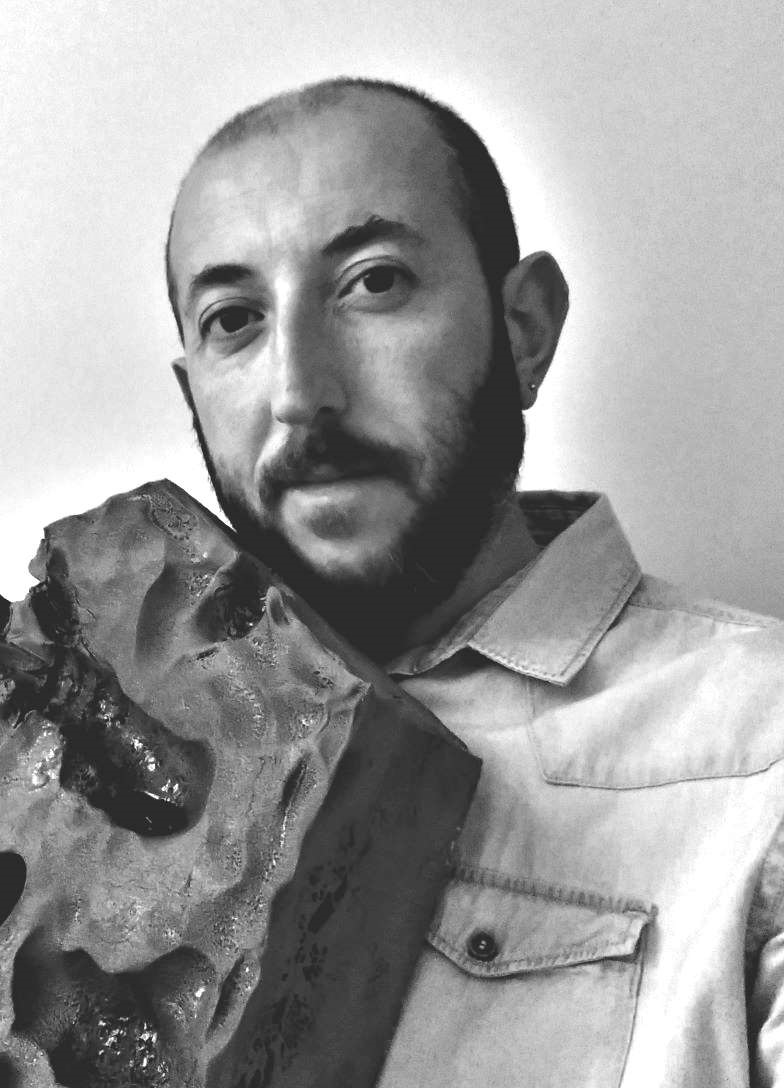
- Born: 13 June 1979 (age 47); Paola, Calabria, Italy
- Occupation: Painter
- Movement: Contemporary

Antonello Spadafora (born 13 June 1979 in Paola, Calabria), Italian painter of contemporary art.

== Biography ==
Self-taught Italian painter, born in Paola, Calabria in the province of Cosenza on 13 June 1979. The passion for drawing and pictorial representation accompanied by a strong Catholic cultural influence leads him to the study and realization of his first works of a religious nature. Later he deepens the impressionist painting studying it with the artists who represent it and thus opens up to a new way of interpreting the pictorial medium with the decomposition of forms. Various techniques are used, from the traditional ones, painting with oil colors on canvas to mixed techniques in which he simultaneously uses multiple materials such as oil, acrylics, watercolors, enamels, mixed techniques with the use of chains, ropes, metals, woods and sand, which are applied on different substrates such as canvas, paper, wood, metal, plexiglass, polystyrene, glass and fabric.

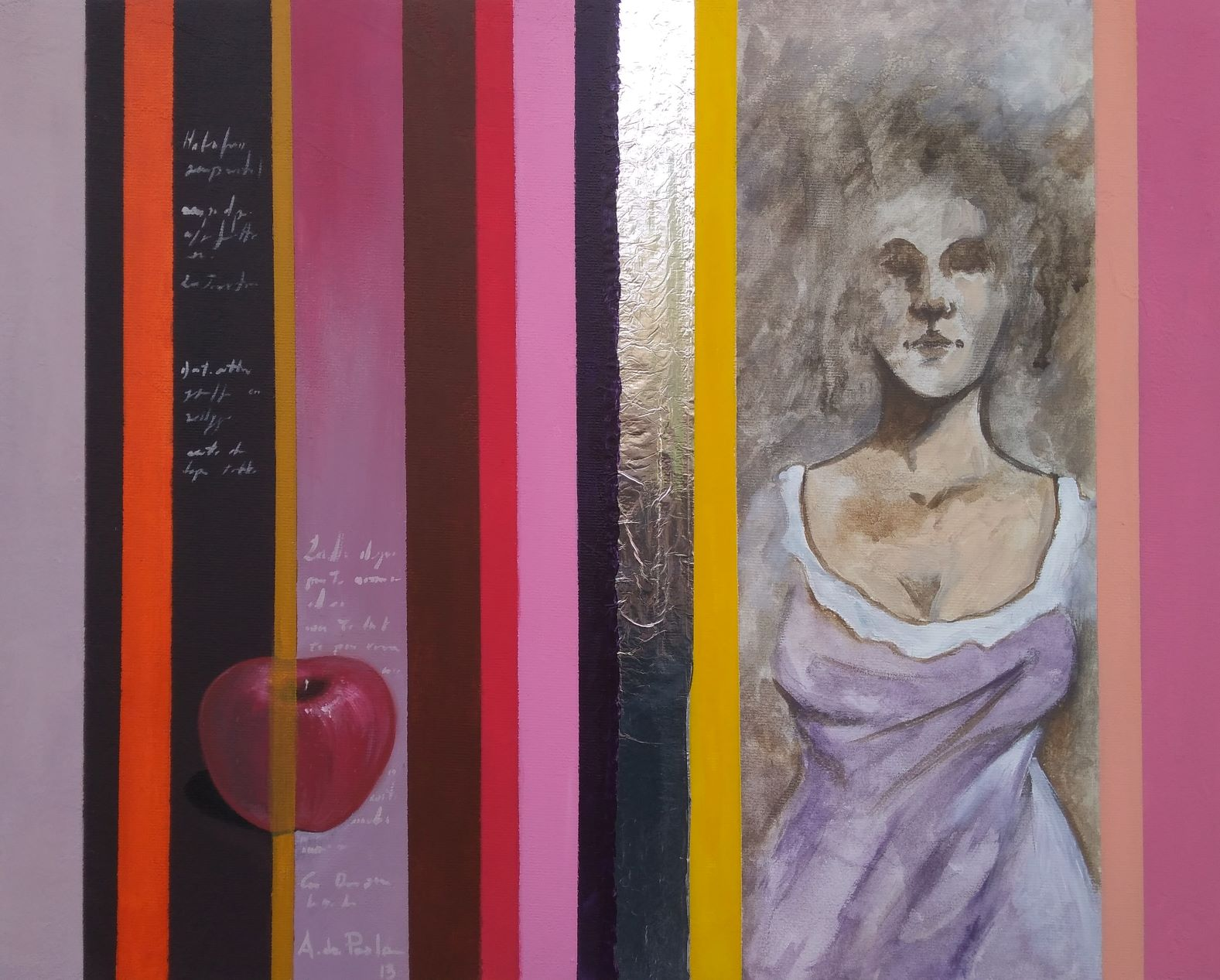
Distraction-5, tecnica mista su tela, 2013

In the 2000s he moved to Rome where he tackled different creative styles, the subjects treated in the early years range from landscape to portrait, passing through abstraction, material and lyric, up to metaphysical compositions. In recent years, research has focused on social issues, fragility and uncertainty of everyday life, transformation and consequent renewal, precariousness. He resorts to the use of different materials that interact with each other, mainly fabrics and fabrics, on which he intervenes with fire, with paint, with ink. In 2018 he competed for the Mondadori Art Award, ranking among the finalists in the sections on painting, sculpture, photography and graphics, with the work then exhibited at the Palazzo Reale in Milan Changing, 2018.

In 2024 he was invited to the exhibition curated by the art historian Michela Ramadori, Frontier art: expressing and representing disability. A selection of works from the Paolo Salvati Archive Collection and other collections, Rome, Borromini salon, Biblioteca Vallicelliana.

== Bibliography ==
- Monograph, Sotto il cielo pulito, personal exhibition catalog of Antonello Spadafora, Roma, 2010.
- Monograph, I volti di san Francesco, personal exhibition catalog of Antonello Spadafora, by P. Rocco Benvenuto, Michele Bassarelli, Pizzo Calabro, 2016.
- Monograph, Mistery, personal exhibition catalog of Antonello Spadafora, Paola, Calabria, 2017.
- Monograph, Nella croce, personal exhibition catalog of Antonello Spadafora, Paola, Galleria C.so Garibaldi, Paola, Calabria, 2018.
- Monograph, Clothing, personal exhibition catalog of Antonello Spadafora, by Marta Lock, Paola, Calabria, 2019.
- Catalog of Modern Art No 54, in Giovanni Faccenda, "The Italian Artist from the early twentieth century to today"(Gli Artisti Italiani dal Primo Novecento ad Oggi), Giorgio Mondadori, Milan, 2019, pp. 88. ISBN 978-88-6052-924-4
- Monograph, Cotidianam, personal exhibition catalog of Antonello Spadafora, by Roberto Sottile, Marta Lock, Roma, 2020.
- Monograph, Alberto Moioli, Enciclopedia d'Arte Italiana. Catalogo Generale Artisti dal Novecento ad oggi, 2022, Milan, vol. 10. ISBN 978-88-941191-9-0
- Monograph, Cesare Sarzini, Antonello Spadafora, riflessione filosofica e qualità pittorica, Editions of Italian Modern and Contemporary Art Archives, 2022, Rome. ISBN 978-88946055-8-7
