= Antonio Servillo =

Italian painter (born 1964)

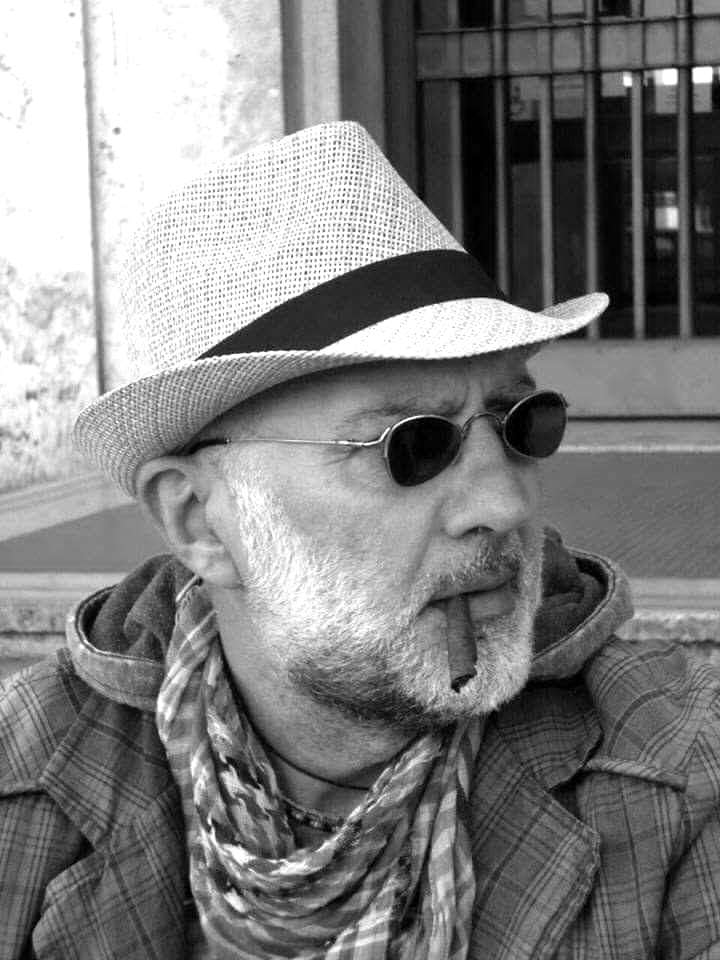
- Born: 12 November 1964 (age 61); Padua, Italy
- Occupation: Painter
- Movement: Contemporary
- Website: https://www.servilloart.com/

Antonio Servillo (born 12 November 1964 in Padua), Italian painter of contemporary art.

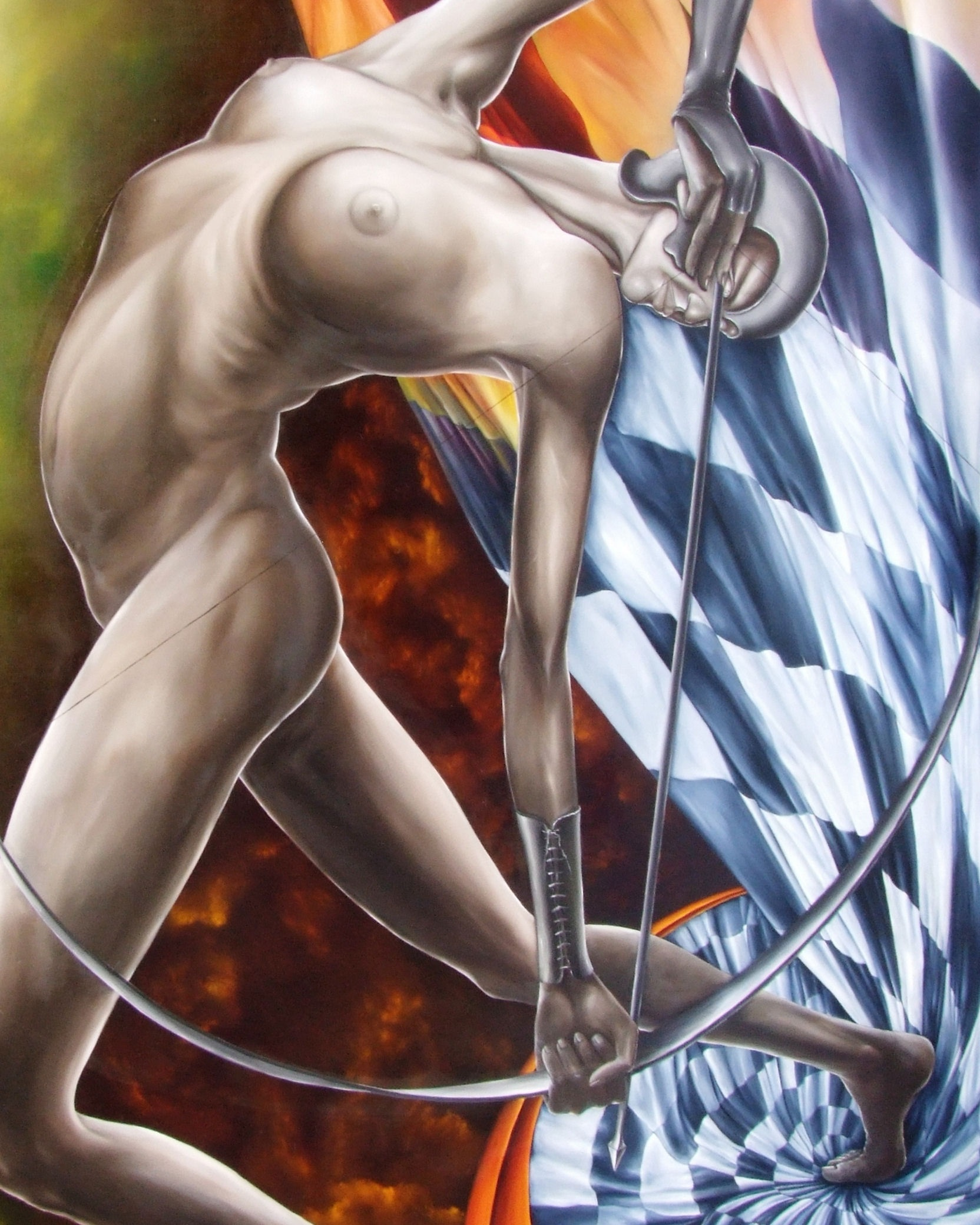
Amazzone, sezione di opera, anno 2008 di Antonio Servillo

== Biography ==
Antonio Servillo is a self-taught Italian painter, born in Padua from a neapolitan family on November 12, 1964. He paints episodes from his childhood in the small town of Campania where he lived with his family of origin. Through his first period as a draftsman, then as a madonnaro, he arrives at a surrealist and metaphysical painting in the eighties. Moving to Rome in 1984, he joined the historic Cento Pittori via Margutta, here he had the opportunity to meet established artists such as Mario Schifano and Paolo Salvati. His works are halfway between visions from the future, of a world in which man will only become a performer, a subject of the realm of the mechanics of those androids that in the present time he is trying to create. Exhibits in personal exhibitions in Rome, Bologna and Naples, numerous exhibitions in the street.

== Bibliography ==
- Catalog, personal exhibition, Napoli, Hotel Villa Giulia, luglio 1999.
- Catalog, personal exhibition, Follonica, Pinacoteca Civica, luglio 2003.
- Annuario Arte Moderna artisti contemporanei 2004, ACCA in.. Arte Editrice pp. 509
- Annuario Arte Moderna artisti contemporanei 2005, ACCA in.. Arte Editrice pp. 254–256/2.
- Le voci dell'oblio, by Luca Tescaroli, illustrations by Antonio Servillo. ISBN 88-87778-04-3
- Catalogo "Arte a Palazzo" dinamiche del contemporaneo, pp. 217–218, Bologna, 2016, di Galleria Fantini Concept.
- Catalog of Modern Art No 53, in Giovanni Faccenda, "The Italian Artist from the early twentieth century to today"(Gli Artisti Italiani dal Primo Novecento ad Oggi), Giorgio Mondadori, Milan, 2019, pp. 443, 74. ISBN 978-88-6052-845-2
- Catalog, Il mondo e le sue ombre: mostra personale di Antonio Servillo, Roma, Tartaglia Arte, dal 22 al 30 aprile 2001.
- Catalog, Artisti '20, Annuario internazionale d'arte contemporanea, by Vittorio Sgarbi, Philippe Daverio, pp. 410, 1109, 1308, Giorgio Mondadori, 2020. ISBN 978-88-9439-70-9-3
- Monograph, Antonio Servillo, by Marta Lock, Roma,2020.
- Catalog, Quando la fantasia diventa arte : Biennale 2021, 2. edizione, concorso internazionale di pittura, by Inter@rt.ISBN 979-12-80434-01-2
- Via Margutta Storia della Strada degli Artisti e dei Cento Pittori, in Luigi Salvatori, Roberta Imperatori, Eventi d'Arte Cento Pittori via Margutta, Roma, 2021.ISBN 979-12-80434-03-6
- Monograph, La produzione pittorica di Antonio Servillo, by Michela Ramadori, Roma, 2021.ISBN 978-88-946055-4-9
- Luigi Salvatori, 117ª Mostra Cento Pittori via Margutta, Rome, 2023. ISBN 979-12-80434-12-8
- Alberto Moioli, Enciclopedia d'Arte Italiana, Catalogo Generale Artisti dal Novecento ad oggi, vol.11, Milan, 2023.
- Alberto Moioli, Enciclopedia d'Arte Italiana, Catalogo Generale Artisti dal Novecento ad oggi, Milan, 2024. ISBN 978-88-947879-0-0
- Michela Ramadori, Arte di frontiera: esprimere e rappresentare la disabilità. Una selezione di opere della Collezione Archivio Paolo Salvati e di altre raccolte, Rome, 2024. ISBN 978-88-947049-1-4
