= Emporio Daverio =

- Genre: Documentary
- Created by: Philippe Daverio
- Directed by: Flavio Bernard and Alessandro Tresa
- Original language: Italian

Original release
- Network: Rai 5

Emporio Daverio was a weekly program designed and conducted by Philippe Daverio, devoted each time to a specific city or geographical area in Italy. The analysis of art, architecture, gastronomy and culture became key to reflection on the past and present of the city. The program showcased only the beautiful, the unusual and the recondite without entering into the contemporary debates. The purpose, in addition to aesthetic pleasure, is the stimulus of curiosity and knowledge necessary for a plan to safeguard the immense national artistic heritage. The program is written by Philippe Daverio, directed by Flavio Bernard and Alessandro Tresa, the audio guides were edited by Alessandro Buccini, the final title and animated inserts by Giuseppe Ragazzini .

The first series was broadcast between December 2010 and March 2011, every Wednesday at 10.00 pm on Rai 5, which was one of the launch programs.

== Plots ==
- Siena (aired on 02-12-10)
- Mantua (on 08-12-10)
- Ferrara (aired on 15-12-10)
- The lakes of Lombardy (aired on 12-01-11)
- The Biellese (aired on 19-01-11)
- Bassano del Grappa (aired on 26-01-11)
- Aosta (on 02-02-11)
- The Tyrol (aired on 09-02-11)
- Orvieto (broadcast on 16-02-11)
- Bologna (broadcast on 23-02-11)
- Busseto (on 02-03-11)
- Conegliano (aired on 09-03-11)
