= Venturoni =

Venturoni is a surname. Notable people with the sunrname include:

- Guido Venturoni (1934–2025), Italian Navy officer
- Roberto Venturoni (1945–2011), Italian painter, engraver, and sculptor
