= Generoso Pompa =

Italian painter (born 1952)

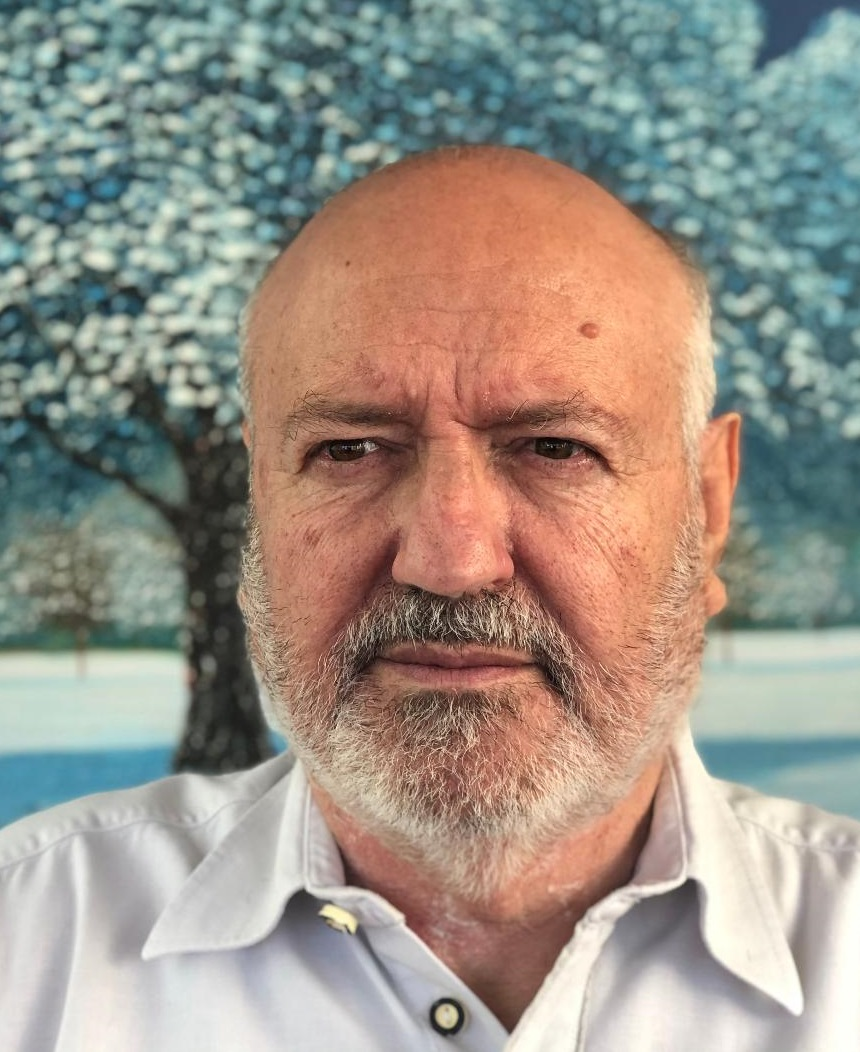
- Gene, pseudonym of Generoso Pompa, Italian painter
- Born: 11 March 1952 (age 74); Alexandria, Egypt
- Occupation: Painter
- Website: https://www.genepompa.com/wp/

Generoso Pompa (born 11 March 1952), also known as Gene, is an Italian painter of contemporary art.

== Biography ==
Born in Alexandria, Egypt, in 1952, Pompa has lived in Rome since 1962, where he graduated in mural painting from the St Giacomo Institute, (1995–1996). He began his career as a painter in the seventies, becoming familiar with artistic techniques by copying the works of the great masters of the past. Since the 1990s he has been working full-time, alternating surreal works with landscape pieces. The feature that makes Pompa's painting recognizable is his relief technique, using a painting knife and brush to accomplish three-dimensional paintings in oil.

Pompa has participated in more than 100 personal exhibitions as well as 600 national and International art exhibitions, member of the art association Cento Pittori via Margutta. His work has also been shown in public and private galleries and museums. In 2013, his monograph was published by Giorgio Mondadori and edited by Giovanni Faccenda, Vittorio Sgarbi, and Philippe Daverio. 2016 saw MyArt published with critical text written by Daniel Radini Tedeschi. In 2014, some of his works were part of the set design of the GEO program of RAI 3. He lives and works between Rome and Spoleto.

== Bibliography ==
- Monograph, Gene Pompa: meraviglie di natura, by Giovanni Faccenda, Cairo, Milan, 2013. ISBN 978-88-6052-512-3.
- Monograph, Gene Pompa: incontaminati paesaggi, by Vittorio Sgarbi, EA Editore, Palermo, 2014.
- Monograph, Gene Pompa by Vittorio Sgarbi, EA Editore, Palermo, 2016.
- Monograph, Dossier Gene, by Philippe Daverio, Art Now, Palermo, 2020.
- Catalog of Modern Art No. 53, in Giovanni Faccenda, "The Italian Astist from the early twentieth century to today"( Gli Artisti Italiani dal Primo Novecento ad Oggi) Giorgio Mondadori, Milan, 2017, pp. 400–401. ISBN 978-88-6052-845-2.
- Catalog of Modern Art No. 54, in Giovanni Faccenda, "The Italian Artists from the early twentieth century to today"( Gli Artisti Italiani dal Primo Novecento ad Oggi) Giorgio Mondadori, Milan, 2018, pp. 411–412. ISBN 978-88-6052-924-4.
- Catalog of Modern Art No. 55, in Giovanni Faccenda, "The Italian Artists from the early twentieth century to today"( Gli Artisti Italiani dal Primo Novecento ad Oggi) Giorgio Mondadori, Milan, 2019, pp. 392–393. ISBN 978-88-374-1877-9.
- Monograph, Gene: Collana SIGNA ARTIS, by Philippe Daverio, Giovanni Faccenda, Vittorio Sgarbi, Giammarco Puntelli, Editore Giorgio Mondadori, Milan, 2020. ISBN 978-88-374-1897-7.
- Catalog, Artisti '21. Annuario internazionale d'arte contemporanea, by Philippe Daverio, Vittorio Sgarbi, Gene Pompa on the cover, Art Now, Milan, 2021. ISBN 978-88-943-9707-9.
