= Cento Pittori via Margutta =

Collective exhibition of painting

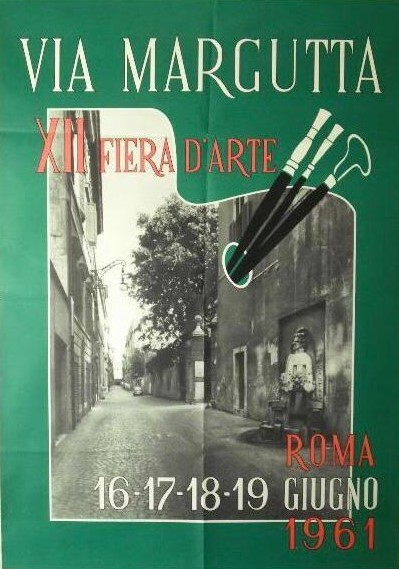
- Genre: Exhibition contemporary art
- Frequency: two annual exhibitions
- Location: Rome Italy
- Years active: 1970–2021
- Inaugurated: 1953
- Participants: Painters
- Area: Via Margutta
- Organiser: Cento Pittori via Margutta
- Website: www.centopittoriviamargutta.it

Associazione Cento Pittori via Margutta, (Rome 22 June 1970), is a cultural and historical association of painters that exhibits as a Cento Pittori via Margutta mainly in Rome, in via Margutta, whose exhibition origins date back to October 1953.

== History ==
The first street exhibitions in via Margutta date from 1953, during the years of La Dolce Vita portrayed by Federico Fellini in his film. The artists hung their paintings on the walls and the street appeared as an immense outdoor art gallery. In the following years the Department of Tourism, Sport and Entertainment sponsored the first exhibitions and gave a new arrangement to the place by providing free electricity supply and jute panels sewn around metal armor.

Via Margutta gave the impression of a lively main street of a small town dotted with numerous workshops where artists and artisans collaborated with each other, exchanging creativity and materials. The bar at 53 via Margutta, near the intersection of via Alibert, was a meeting place for artists, including Giulio Turcato, Corrado Cagli, Renato Guttuso, Renzo Vespignani, Alberto Burri, Sante Monachesi, Gabriele Patriarca, Pericle Fazzini, Mimmo Rotella, Gino Zocchi, and Barbara Berardicurti.

The Art Fairs exhibitions took place until 1969, sponsored by the Department of Fine Arts and Cultural Issues. In spring and autumn, the artists decorated with their works via Margutta, via Alibert, via degli Orti di Napoli and vicolo del Babuino, as well as all the characteristic adjacent patios. On 22 June 1970 painters and founding partners as Alessandro D'amico, Leonardo De Magistris, Alfredo Jacobacci, Cesare Augusto Pozzal, Maria Antonelli, Walter Scotti, Gianfranco Tannozzini, Antonietta Tomassetti, Giulio Bellardini founded the current Association One Hundred Painters of via Margutta. Since then, twice a year, in autumn and spring, the artists exhibit their works in via Margutta. The exhibitions took place in via Margutta until 1984. Then, from 1985, the artists also moved to the Spanish Steps, Piazza Mignanelli, Testaccio district, Piazza del Popolo, Palazzo Valentini, Alberto Sordi Gallery (formerly Colonna Gallery), MACRO Museum. Many artists have admired and currently sing the praises of the role played by the association, among them Paolo Salvati, Novella Parigini, Rinaldo Caressa, Antonio Servillo, and Generoso Pompa.

The first president was Leonardo De Magistris in office since (1970–1973), successor Alberto Vespaziani in office since (1973–2018), and from (2018–2025) Luigi Salvatori, since 2025 Antonio Servillo, became president of the historic association One Hundred Painters of Via Margutta that, through dedicated exhibitions, aims at enhancing the cultural value represented by artists and by other protagonists of the Italian culture.

== Volumes ==
- Exhibition Catalog, Via Margutta a Testaccio 1987–1988, Associazione Cento Pittori Via Margutta.
- Exhibition Catalog, Insieme per la solidarietà, Ospedale S. Giovanni Calibita-Isola Tiberina, Chiostro della Fontana, 14 novembre 2001.
- Exhibition Catalog, Omaggio al Pontificio Consiglio Justitia et Pax, 2004.
- Exhibition Catalog, I Cento pittori di via Margutta ad H2Roma energy & mobility show, 2010.
- Exhibition Catalog, Molte mani un solo cuore per dar vita ad un sogno, Cento Pittori via Margutta; Unione italiana dei Ciechi e degli ipovedenti, 2010.
- Catalog Via Margutta Storia della Strada degli Artisti e dei Cento Pittori, in Luigi Salvatori, Andrea Salvati, Antonio Servillo, Roberta Imperatori, Eventi d'Arte Cento Pittori via Margutta, Roma, 2021.ISBN 979-12-80434-03-6
