= Roberto Venturoni =

Italian painter (1945–2011)

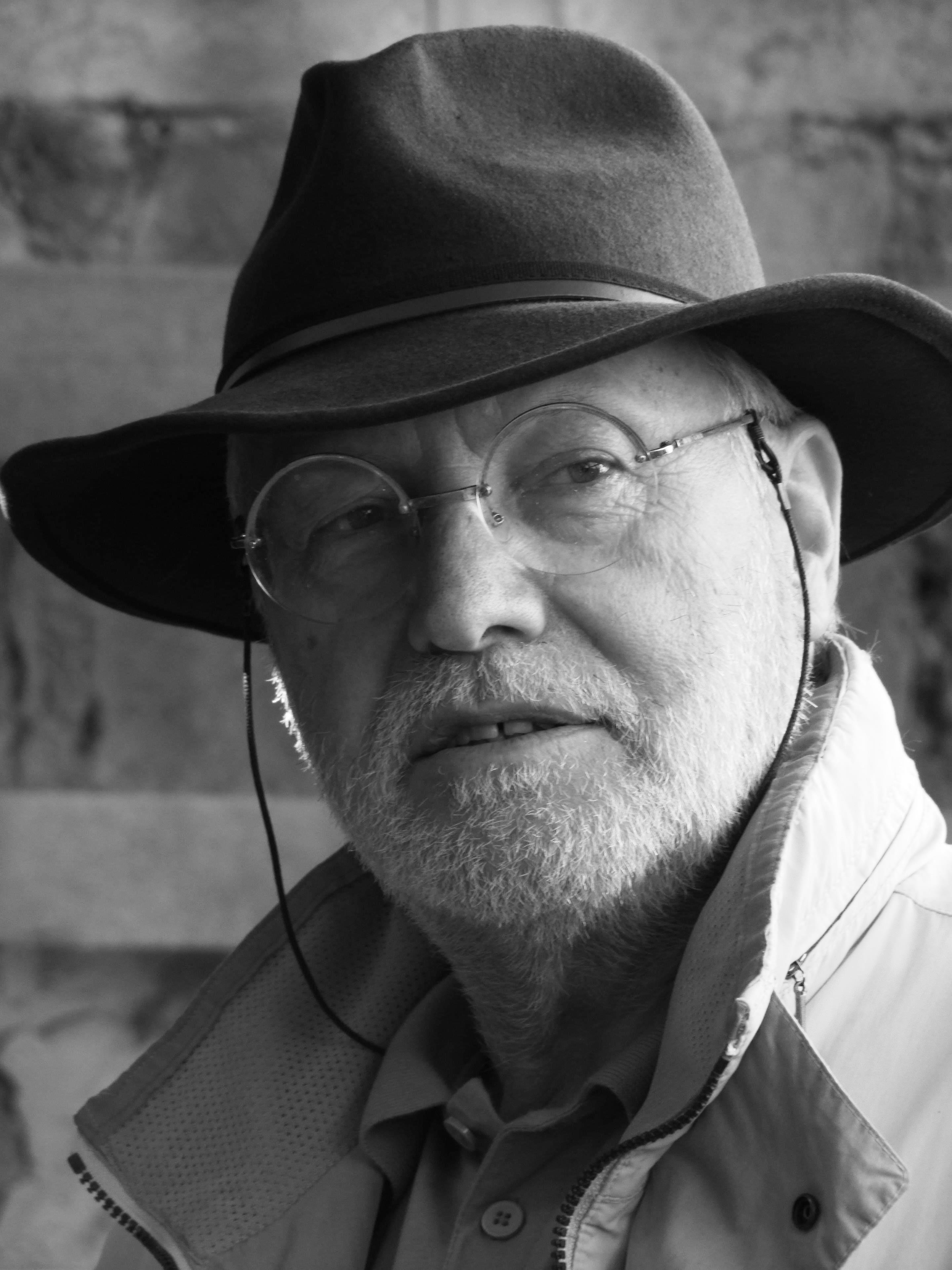
- Roberto Venturoni
- Born: 22 October 1945 (age 80); Rome, Italy
- Died: 18 September 2011 (aged 65); Rome, Italy
- Occupations: Painter, engraver and sculptor
- Website: http://www.robertoventuroni.it/

Roberto Venturoni (Rome, 22 October 1945 – Rome, 18 September 2011), was an Italian painter, engraver and sculptor.

== Biography ==
Born in Rome in 1945, he began painting at a young age, following the figurative style of his time, mainly landscape. He reveals himself as an artist with an intense productive activity as a painter, sculptor and engraver. Above all a painter, he researches and experiments different pictorial stylistic solutions, he prefers impressionism. He has attended specialization courses in painting and engraving since 1973, studying drawing, watercolor and pastel with Silvio Bicchi in Rome. Since 1979 he has followed courses in engraving techniques and chalcography printing at Luigi Guardigli "ELLEGI" school laboratory.

From 1981 under the direction of Giulio Turcato, he attended the Free School of Nude at the Academy of Fine Arts in Via Ripetta in Rome. From 1986 to 1987, he studied new engraving and printing techniques (drypoint, etching, artistic prints) at the "Four For Art" Laboratory School directed by Ernesto Nino Palleschi. He exhibits his works in Italy, France and Japan. Participates in the group shows, Agostiniana Gallery (1986), Canovaccio Gallery (1987), Osaka Municipal Museum, Japan, (1992), Arlesienne Gallery in Arles, Biennial of European Engraving – Rotary Club Acqui Terme Ovada (2000), Castello degli Estensi Ferrara (2009). The solo shows, Babuino Gallery, Rome (1980); Sala Bramante, Rome (1991), Museo Castel Sant’Angelo (2007), Location Studio DR Spazio Visivo (2007), Ryu Gallery, Shizuoka Japan (2010). He met famous exponents of Italian pictorial art but was above all a friend of Paolo Salvati (1939–2014), companion of numerous exhibitions. Venturoni died 2011 in Roma.

== Bibliography ==
- Catalog. I paesaggi di Roberto Venturoni: percezione e comunicativa di una efficace interpretazione, by Carlo Savini, 1987.
- Monograph, Roberto Venturoni: i paesaggi dell'io; by Dario Micacchi, 1990.
- Catalog, Venturoni: Sala del Bramante, 1991.
- Monograph, L'incisione: Roberto Venturoni, by Roberta Perfetti, 1994.
- Catalog, Venturoni: strutture, maschere e manufatti: opere grafiche, 1995.
- Catalog, Le maschere di Roberto Venturoni, by Domenico Guzzi, 1999.
- Monograph, Venturoni: terrecotte, 1999, Edizioni Four For Art, Roma.
- Catalog, Roberto Venturoni: l'opera grafica: 1979–2002, by Ferruccio Massimi, 2003.
- Monograph, Venturoni: opere astratte 2006.
- Catalog of Italian sculptors, by Paolo Levi, Editore Giorgio Mondadori, 2006, pp. 341.ISBN 88-6052-043-6
- Catalog, Venturoni: Blu cosmici: Castel Sant'Angelo, 8–10 dicembre 2007.
- Catalog of Italian sculptors, by Paolo Levi, Editore Giorgio Mondadori, 2008, pp. 357.ISBN 978-88-6052-181-1
- Catalog, Percorsi d'arte in Italia, by Giorgio Di Genova, Editore Rubettino, 2016, pp. 249.ISBN 978-88-498-4944-8

== Paintings in museums ==
- Museum of Modern and Contemporary Art, Artists present at Anticoli between the 19th and 21st century of Anticoli Corrado.
- Museo Civico delle Cappuccine, Bagnacavallo, Italy,
