= Gabriele Patriarca =

Italian informal painter

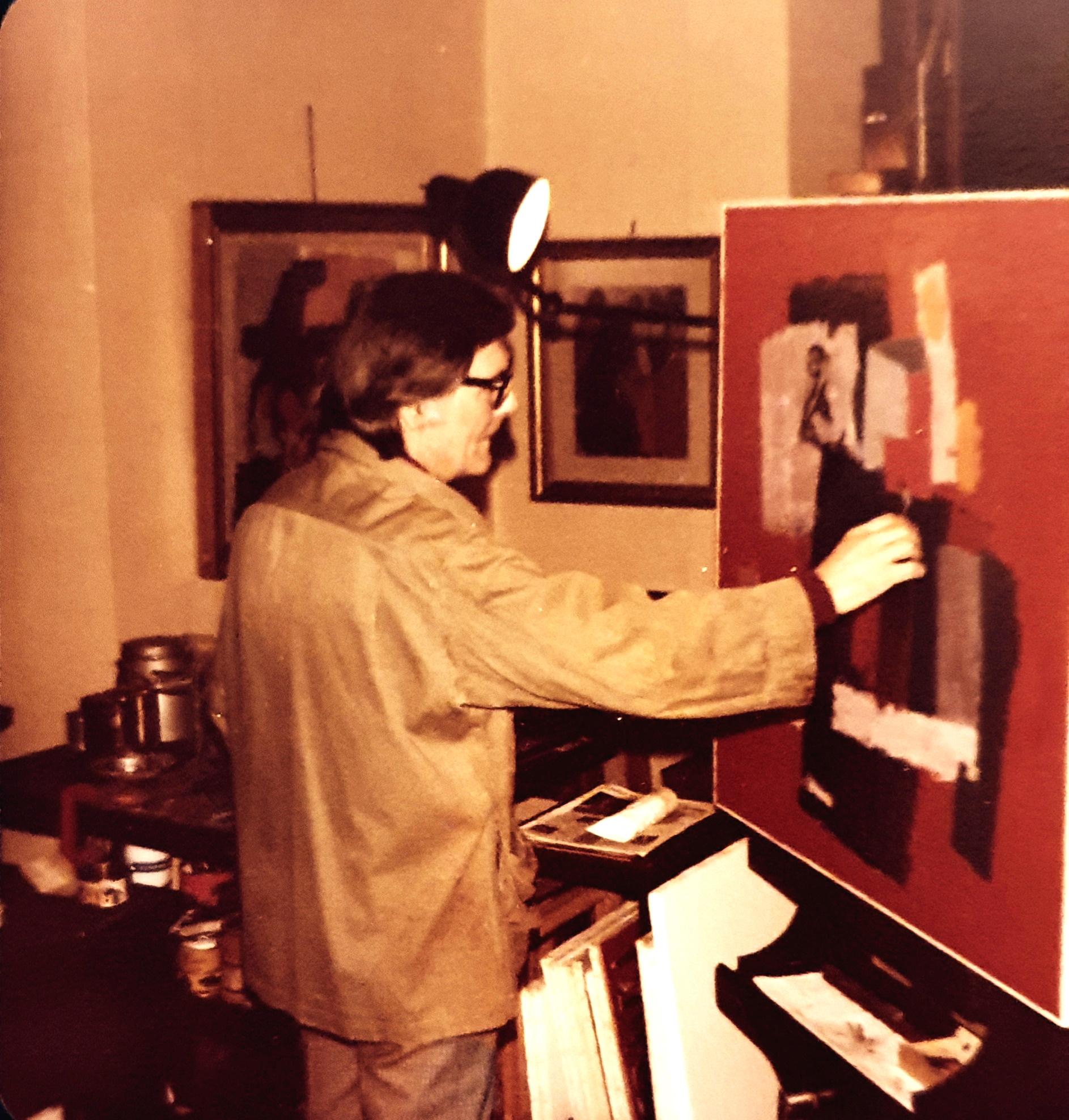
- Italian painter
- Born: 10 July 1916; Rome, Italy
- Died: September 2, 1988 (aged 72); Rome, Italy
- Occupation: Painter

Gabriele Patriarca (Rome, 10 July 1916 - Rome, 2 September 1988) was an Italian informal painter and member of the art movement Scuola Romana.

== Biography ==
He studied at the ‘Accademia del Nudo’ in Rome in 1952. He grew up artistically within that epochal revolution that marked the detachment from the classic artistic rules and schemes in favour of expressive modernity. Patriarca made his debut with figurative art, but he could not do without embracing the avant-gardes of that time and experimenting with new stylistic principles. He was the maternal uncle of the painter Paolo Salvati. His paintings are stylized, minimalist in the stroke, the faces anonymous, without noses, because the artist expressed that tendency to go further. Since 1954 he participated in exhibitions as Rome Quadriennale, the National Landscape Award "Autostrada del Sole" at Palazzo delle Esposizioni in Rome from 30 November 1961 to 7 January 1962, together with artists such as Giuseppe Capogrossi, Giorgio de Chirico, and at the Biennial of Art of Rome in 1968, together with artists such as Alberto Burri, Ugo Attardi, and Fausto Pirandello.

He made exhibitions at the National Award "Due Sponde" in Messina in 1956, at the National Award in Ferrara in 1957, at Frattina Award in 1957 to 1959, at the sacred art exhibition in Spello and in Celano in 1964 to 1966, at the National Painting Award in Catania in 1965, at Alatri Biennials of Figurative Art at Palazzo Conti-Gentili in 1958, 1961 and 1962, 1975, 1977 and 1979. In 1974 at L’Agostiniana Gallery at Piazza del Popolo in Rome, his last solo exhibition. He received the first prize at the exhibition of sacred art San Bonaventura da Bagnoregio in 1974 and the first prize at Marian art exhibition at Palazzo Barberini in Rome in 1986.

He died in Rome on September 2, 1988. In June 1998, ten years after his death, an anthological exhibition was dedicated to him at the historic L'Agostiniana Gallery. His works are shown at the Municipal Museum in Noto, at the Municipal Art Gallery in Celano, at Monte dei Paschi di Siena Foundation, at the Churches of Santa Maria del Popolo, at the Civic Museum in Alatri, Rovereto and Spoleto. Marcellino Venturoli, Renato Civello, and Michele Biancale wrote about him.

== Bibliography ==
- Catalog Quadriennale d'arte di Roma,Premio nazionale di paesaggio Autostrada del Sole: novembre 1961-gennaio 1962, Palazzo delle Esposizioni, Roma.
- Catalog, IV Rassegna di Arti Figurative di Roma e del Lazio, Edizioni dell'Ateneo, 1963, Roma, pp. 24.
- Catalog, Prima Mostra Nazionale d'Arte Sacra, Roma, 14-24 aprile 1965, pp. 21.
- Catalog, Pittori e pittura contemporanea, Edizioni Il Quadrato 1970, Milano, pp. 487.
- Catalog, Cinque momenti pittorici : Luisa Catanea, Carlomonti, Quirino Cervelli, Gabriele Patriarca, Carlo Speranza / a cura di Gaetano M. Bonifati, 1979.
- Catalog, Gabriele Patriarca, CIDA Edizioni d'Arte, 1986.
- Catalog, Gabriele Patriarca : Mostra antologica 1948-1988.

== See also ==
- Quadriennale di Roma
- Cento Pittori via Margutta
