= Luigi Salvatori =

Italian painter (born 1951)

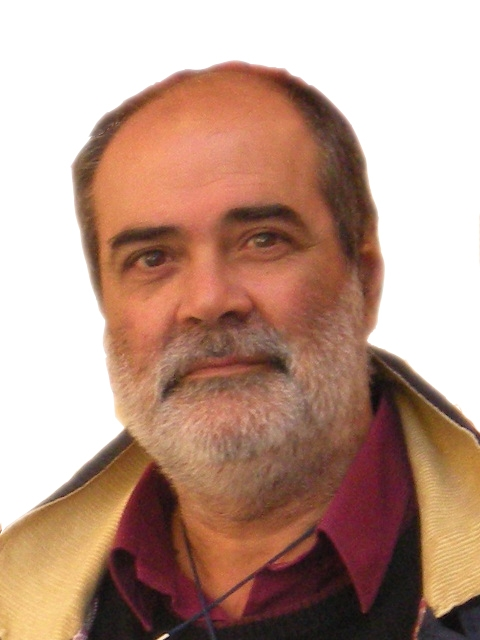
- Born: 25 October 1951 (age 74); Palestrina, Italy
- Occupation: Painter
- Website: https://www.luigisalvatori.it/

Luigi Salvatori (born 25 October 1951 in Palestrina), Italian painter of contemporary art.

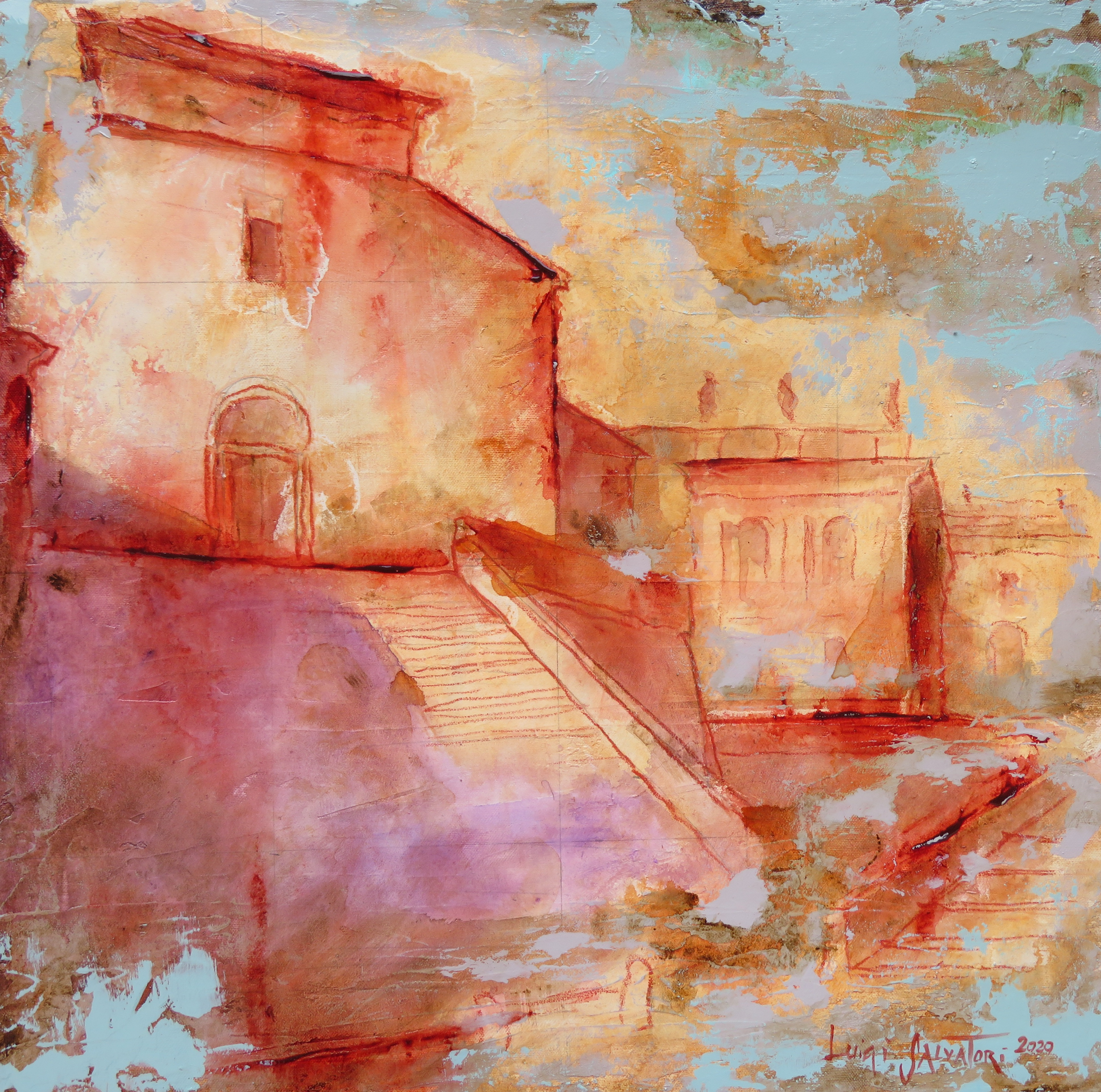
Luci sull'Ara Coeli, acrilico su tela, 60x60, 2020

== Biography ==
Born in Palestrina in the province of Rome on 25 October 1951, he comes from a family of painters, he is the grandson of the painters Marcello Salvatori and Mario Fornari. He starts mainly as a chiaroscuro pencil draftsman, then moves on to painting. He graduated as an Architect in 1976 at the La Sapienza University of Rome and began working on Sacred and Community Art, from the restoration and design of churches to stained glass windows and sacred furnishings. He paints an interior research where real landscapes are replaced by landscapes filtered through memory, the desire for the invisible, for the infinite. In 1994 he joined the historic Association of Cento Pittori via Margutta in Rome, in 1998 he joined the board of directors, from 2018 to today he has held the position of President of the association. Married with seven children, he lives and works in Rome.

== Bibliography ==
- Annuario Arte Moderna artisti contemporanei 2002, ACCA in.. Arte Editrice.
- Annuario Arte Moderna artisti contemporanei 2003, ACCA in.. Arte Editrice.
- Annuario Arte Moderna artisti contemporanei 2004, ACCA in.. Arte Editrice.
- Annuario Arte Moderna artisti contemporanei 2005, ACCA in.. Arte Editrice.
- Catalog personal exhibition of Luigi Salvatori: 3.12.2004 - 5.1.2005, South Carolina, Catherine Hayes Art & Sculpture Gallery.
- Monograph, Luigi Salvatori: Il desiderio dell'invisibile, stampa Futura Grafica, Roma, 2010.
- Monograph, I colori della vita, personal exhibition of Luigi Salvatori: Comune di Formello, Palazzo Chigi, Sala Orsini, Museo dell'Agro Veientano, dal 10–25 settembre 2011/Associazione Culturale "Artisti Romani Via Giulia.
- Catalog, Artisti '20, Annuario internazionale d'arte contemporanea, by Vittorio Sgarbi, Philippe Daverio, pp. 406, 1106, 1304, Giorgio Mondadori ISBN 978-88-9439-70-9-3
- Monograph, Luigi Salvatori, by Marta Lock, Fattino Tedeschi, 2020, Pescara.
- Catalog, Quando la fantasia diventa arte, Biennale 2021, concorso internazionale, by Daniela Negrelli, Andrea Nassi. ISBN 979-12-80434-01-2
- Via Margutta Storia della Strada degli Artisti e dei Cento Pittori, in Luigi Salvatori, Antonio Servillo, Roberta Imperatori, Eventi d'Arte, Roma, 2021.ISBN 979-12-80434-03-6
- Monograph, Paesaggi e visioni romane di Luigi Salvatori, by Cesare Sarzini, Roma, 2021. ISBN 979-12-80434-00-5

== Paintings in museums ==
- Museo Storico Scuola Alpina della Guardia di Finanza, Predazzo, DSC 0145.
- Museo Storico dell'Accademia della Guardia di Finanza, Bergamo, n.1326/2020 (65).
- Fondazione Museo Luigi Magni e Lucia Mirisola, Velletri, 2021.
