= Philippe Daverio =

Italian art historian (1949–2020)

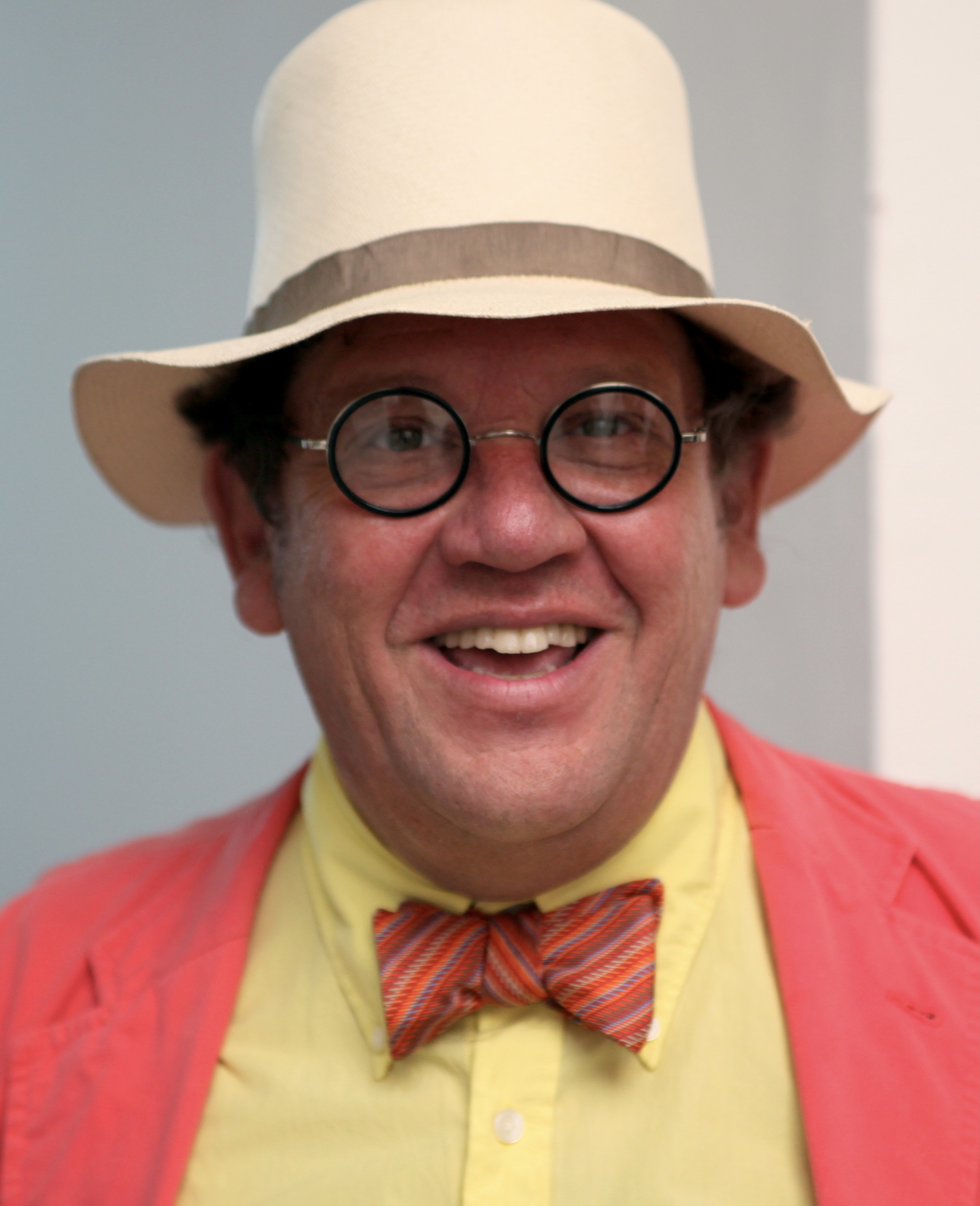
- Daverio in 2010 in Venice
- Born: 17 October 1949; Mulhouse, France
- Died: 2 September 2020 (aged 70); Milan, Italy
- Occupations: Art critic, academic
- Height: 1.73 m (5 ft 8 in)

Philippe Daverio (17 October 1949 – 2 September 2020) was an Italian art historian, gallerist, teacher, writer, author, politician, and television personality.

== Biography ==
Daverio was born in Mulhouse, Alsace in 1949 from an Italian father, builder Napoleone Daverio, and an Alsatian mother, Aurelia Hauss. He was the fourth of six children. Daverio attended the European School in Varese, and then studied economics and commerce at the Bocconi University in Milan. Despite completing his cycle of studies, Daverio refrained from writing his final dissertation. As he said, "I was enrolled at Bocconi in 1968–1969, but I don't hold a degree. In those years you would go to university to learn, not to graduate".

In 1975, he opened Galleria Philippe Daverio in Via Monte Napoleone in Milan, where he mostly focused on the avant-garde movements of the first half of the 20th century. In 1986, he opened the Philippe Daverio Gallery in New York City. In 1989, he opened a second gallery of contemporary art in Milan, Italy. The gallery eventually went bankrupt and closed in 1997.

As a gallerist and publisher, Daverio organized many exhibitions, including Andy Warhol's Last Supper at Galleria del Credito Valtellinese in Milan; he also edited a book on Giorgio de Chirico's work between 1924 and 1929 and a catalogue raisonné on Gino Severini's work. Since 2011 Daverio authored many books with Rizzoli, including The Imaginary Museum (2011); The Long Century of Modernity (2012); Look far to See near You (2013); The Broken Century of avant-garde (2014); The Good Road (2015); Table Art (2015), and Painting Game (2015).

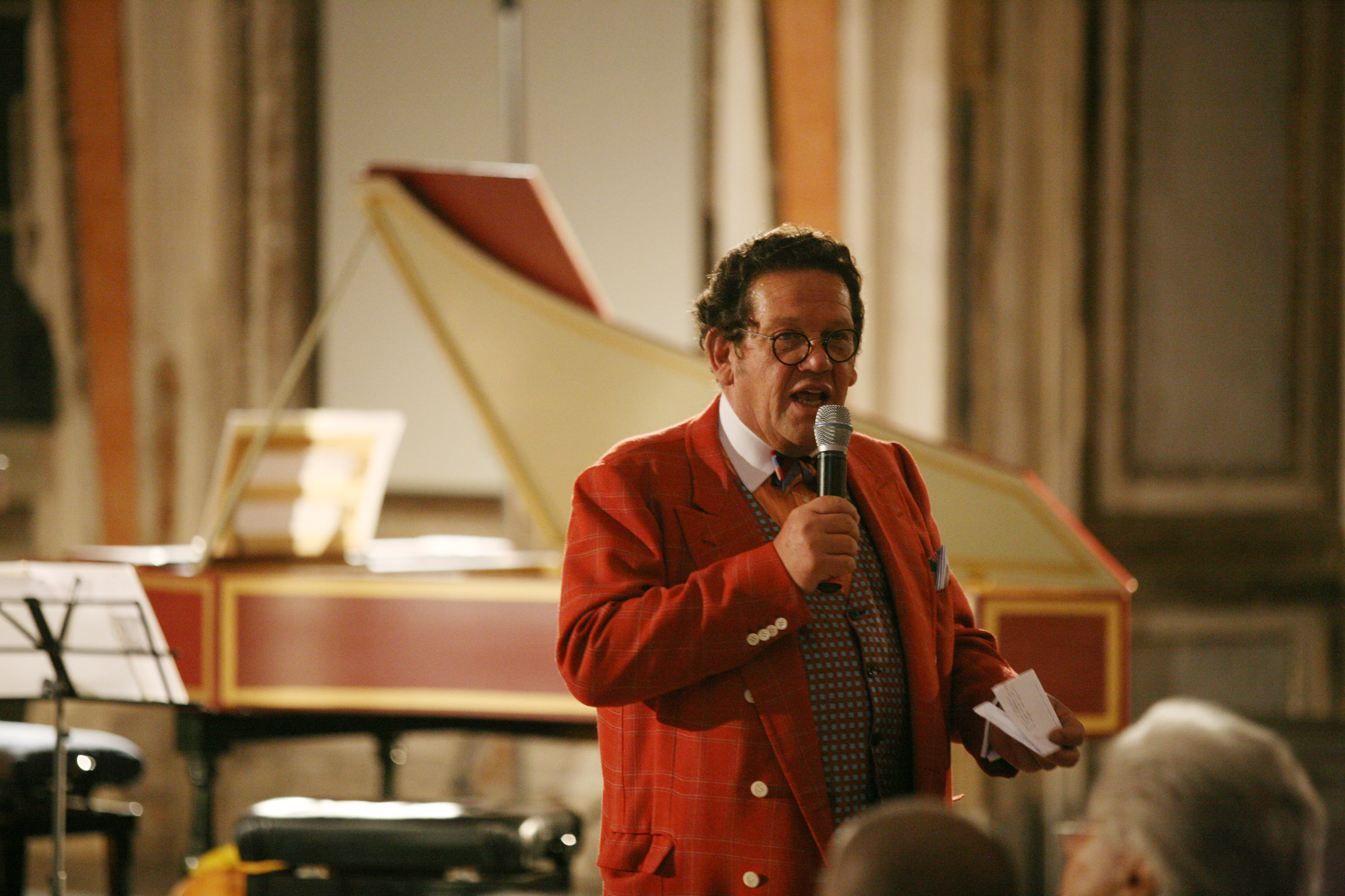
Daverio in 2008

In 1999, he was a special correspondent for the television program Art'è on RAI, and he is one of the authors of Art.tù. From 2002 to 2012, he hosted Passepartout, a series on art and culture on Rai 3. Other TV programs he was involved with include Il Capitale and Emporio Daverio. In 2008, he was called by Pier Luigi Pizzi to interpret the narrator Njegus in the operetta The Merry Widow by Franz Lehár at the Teatro alla Scala in Milan. In 2009, he presented the Shock, a ballet on the catharsis of capital defences directed by Andrea Forte Calatti at the Teatro degli Arcimboldi in Milan. Until 2016, he held the post of professor of art at the University of Palermo. Daverio collaborated with magazines and newspapers such as Panorama, Vogue, Corriere della Sera, Liberal, Avvenire, Il Sole 24 Ore, National Geographic, Touring Club, and Architect and National Daily Quotes. He was the editor of Art and Dossier magazine and a consultant for Skira Books.

Beginning in 2004 he held a summer conference every year at the Colonos farmhouse in Villacaccia di Lestizza in the province of Udine. In 2010 he was appointed by the Mayor of Palermo as a consultant to the Santa Rosalia Feast. However, during the celebration, he had a verbal altercation with some of the contestants and resigned as a result. In September 2010 he was appointed Director of the Landscape Museum of Verbania, on Lake Maggiore, but resigned amid controversy after only two months in the position. From 2011 he was an artistic consultant for the Genus Bononiae project of the Carisbo Foundation in Bologna, which launched the "Bologna shows" exhibitions. Daverio also curated the opening show of the new Palazzo Fava Museum.

In 2016, he began working on a new television program called Modern Culture.

Daverio died of cancer on 2 September 2020, at the age of 70.

== Public service ==
From 1993 to 1997, Daverio was a councillor with delegations to Culture, Leisure, Education, and International Relations in the municipality of Milan. He was subsequently involved in an advisory role in the town council of Salemi in Sicily when Vittorio Sgarbi was mayor. In 2009, he was appointed a provincial councillor of Milan in the civic list of Filippo Penati.

In 2011, in conjunction with the celebrations for the 150th anniversary of the Unification of Italy, he founded the movement of opinion Save Italy. The movement, with no organizational structure, aims to raise awareness of intellectuals and citizens of all geographic origin to safeguard the immense cultural heritage of Italy; "The English denomination serves to testify that the cultural heritage of Italy belongs not only to Italians but to the whole world, also because Latin is studied today much more in Oxford than in Pavia", said Daverio in one of his lectures.

== Work ==
=== Selected books ===
- Graphic and glass works. With a work by Gio Ponti and a testimony by Aldo Salvadori, edited by and with Paolo Baldacci, Milan, Galleria Philippe Daverio, 1977.
- Rome between baroque expressionism and tonal painting. 1929–1943, edited by and with Maurizio Fagiolo dell'Arco and Netta Vespignani, Milan, Mondadori-Philippe Daverio, 1984.
- Amazing art. From Dada to Cracking art, Milan, Mazzotta, 2004. ISBN 88-202-1711-2 .
- The design was born in Milan. History of Kids of Good Family, Milan, Poli.Design, 2005. ISBN 88-87981-75-2 .
- Another Story of Design and a Modest Interpretation, Milan, Poli.Design, 2005. ISBN 88-87981-74-4 .
- 13x17. 1000 artists for an eccentric investigation into art in Italy, edited by and with Jean Blanchaert, Milan, Rizzoli, 2007. ISBN 978-88-17-01895-1 .
- Art is the ship, Milan, Skira-Costa, 2008. ISBN 978-88-572-0010-1 .
- Constellations. Cannavacciuolo. Jori. Massini, Bononia University Press, 2009. ISBN 978-88-7395-424-8
- The Millennium Adventure. Garibaldi's expedition through the redesigned designs by Giuseppe Nodari, edited by, Milan, Rizzoli, 2010. ISBN 978-88-17-04567-4 .
- Giorgio Milani. The Book of Letters, Milan, Skira, 2010. ISBN 978-88-572-0837-4 .
- Giuseppe Antonello Leone, Milan, Skira, 2010. ISBN 978-88-572-0434-5 .
- The imaginary museum, Milan, Rizzoli, 2012. ISBN 978-88-17-05223-8 .
- The art of art, Florence-Milan, Giunti artedossier, 2012. ISBN 978-88-09-77425-4 .
- The long century of modernity. The imagined museum, Milan, Rizzoli, 2012. ISBN 978-88-17-06011-0 .
- Watch Far To See Near, Rizzoli, Necklace: Illustrated, 2013. ISBN 978-88-17-06892-5 .
- Calm and quiet. Subliminal Projects by Alessandro Mendini, Michele De Lucchi and Angelo Micheli, Bononia University Press, 2013. ISBN 978-88-7395-620-4
- Thinking of Art, AlboVersorio, 2013. ISBN 978-88-97553-60-1 .
- The Long Century of Modernity. The museum imagined, Milan, Rizzoli, 2013.
- Lois Anvidalfarei, Milan, Skira, 2013. ISBN 8857220176.
- The broken century of avant-garde. The imagined museum, Milan, Rizzoli, 2014. ISBN 978-88-17-07663-0.
- In good spirits. Products, Producers, Territories, Communities, Photos of Luca and Pepi Merisio, Cantù, Ecra, 2015. ISBN 978-88-6558-162-9
- The good road. 127 walks in Milan, Lombardy and the surrounding area, Rizzoli, 2015. ISBN 978-88-17-07108-6.
- Painting game. Stories, Ties, Inventions, Rizzoli, 2015. ISBN 978-88-17-08370-6.
- The good road. 150 walks in Milan, Lombardy and the surrounding area (extended edition with new destinations), Milan, Rizzoli, 2016. ISBN 978-88-17-08739-1.
- Il lungo viaggio del presepe, Novara, Interlinea, 2016. ISBN 978-88-6857-103-0.
- Le stanze dell'armonia. Nei musei dove l'Europa era già unita, Milan, Rizzoli, 2016. ISBN 978-88-17-08650-9.
- A pranzo con l'arte, with Elena Maria Gregori Daverio, Milan, Rizzoli, 2017. ISBN 978-88-1708-541-0.
- Ho finalmente capito l'Italia. Piccolo trattato ad uso degli stranieri (e degli italiani), Milan, Rizzoli, 2017. ISBN 978-88-918-1517-0.
- Patrizia Comand. La nave dei folli, Milan, Franco Maria Ricci, 2017. ISBN 978-88-9415-332-3.
- Grand Tour d'Italia a piccoli passi. Oltre 80 luoghi e itinerari da scoprire, Milan, Rizzoli, 2018. ISBN 978-88-9181-970-3.
- Quattro conversazioni sull'Europa, Milan, Rizzoli, 2019. ISBN 978-88-918-2113-3.
- Christopher Broadbent. Quel che rimane, with Laura Leonelli, Peliti Associati, 2019. ISBN 978-88-894-1275-6.
- La mia Europa a piccoli passi, Milan, Rizzoli, 2019. ISBN 978-88-918-2562-9.

=== Video ===
- 2005 – The Museum: Communication and Design (Poly Design, DVD)

=== Television ===
- Art.tù (Rai 3)
- Passepartout (Rai 3)
- The Capital of Philippe Daverio (Rai 3)
- Emporio Daverio (Rai 5)

== Honours ==
- Knight of the Order of the Legion of Honour (France)- Rome, 10 September 2013
- Gold Medal for the Benefits of Culture and Art- Rome, 25 March 2013. Initiative by the President of the Republic
- Toson d'Or National Award by Vespasiano Gonzaga – Rotary Club Casalmaggiore Viadana Sabbioneta "For the commitment in spreading the culture and enhancement of historic and artistic Italian." – Sabbioneta, 12 November 2015
