= Paolo Salvati =

Italian painter (1939–2014)

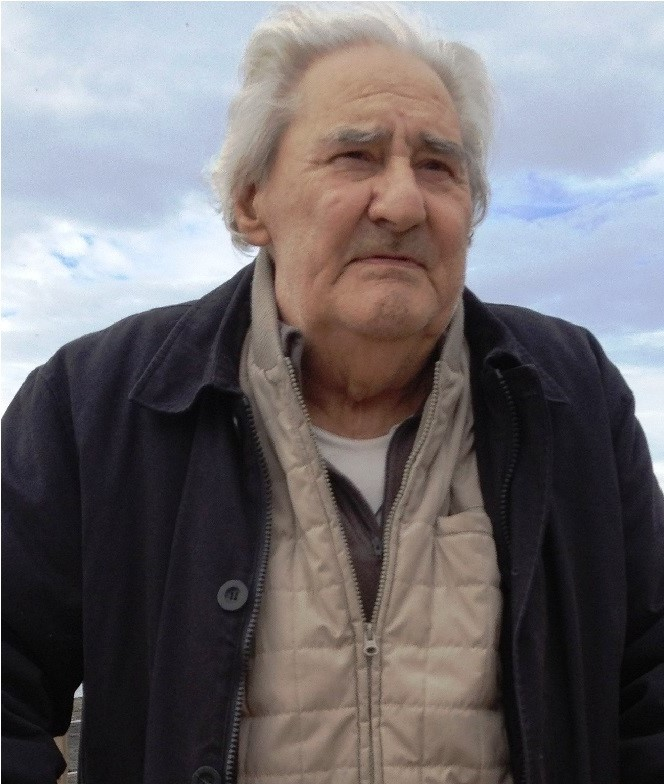
- Paolo Salvati, italian painter
- Born: 22 February 1939; Rome, Italy
- Died: 24 June 2014 (aged 75); Rome, Italy
- Occupation: Painter
- Known for: figurative painter of poetic art, his painting is a metaphorical representation of the inner world of man
- Website: http://www.paolosalvati.it/

Paolo Salvati (22 February 1939 in Rome – 24 June 2014 in Rome) was an Italian figurative artist, painter, and draftsman. His landscapes are the expression of poetic art, characterized by an intense chromatic tone as a metaphorical depiction of the inner world of man.

== Biography ==
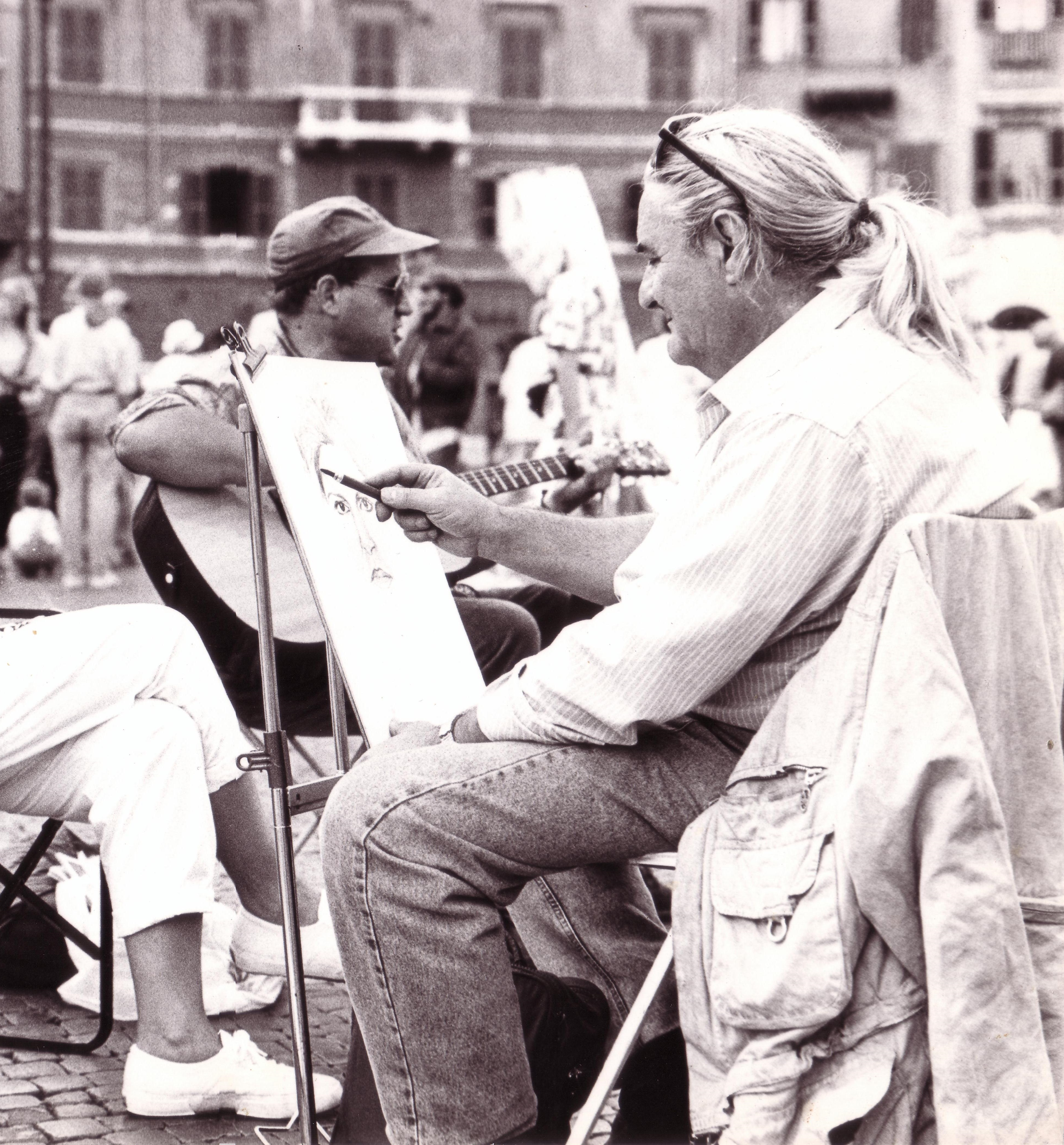
Paolo Salvati, painting in Piazza Navona.

Paolo Salvati was born in Rome on 22 February 1939, in a house on Via Labicana. Expressionist painter, from 1967 exhibited a series of works in oil on canvas throughout cities in Sardinia such as Cagliari, Oristano, Bosa, Ghilarza, Paulilatino until 1969. Since 1970 he participated in exhibitions of plastic and figurative art in the church Trinità dei Monti and in Galleria Colonna renamed Galleria Alberto Sordi in Rome.

He painted subjects figment of the imagination, such as Pietra Blu (English: Blue Stone) in 1973 and 1974, Sogni di Primavera d’Alta Montagna (English: Spring Dreams in High Mountain) in 1974, d’Estate (English: In Summer) in 1975, the paintings Alberi Blu (English: Blue Trees) in 1980, and Montagna Gialla (English: Yellow Mountain) in 1991; subsequently created a series called Fronde Rosse (English: Red Fronds) in 1993, 1994, and 2000. He also realized landscapes, seascapes, and portraits. He used the techniques colours oil on canvas, gouache, pastels, acrylic, and personally prepared canvases and frames which were used in his works. From 1977 to 1993 he worked as a portrait painter in Piazza Navona in Rome; he used pastels on paper, oil on canvas painting miniatures depicting Roman monuments and landscapes of fantasy, produced numerous portraits also oil on canvas.

Expert in designing and making frames on wooden base, research techniques to the preparation of adhesives or for the application of real gold and silver leaf. His passion for guitar music concert lead him to engage in lute making. He became closer with painter and his maternal uncle Gabriele Patriarca, and with Rinaldo Caressa (painter), Roberto Venturoni, with whom he shared some of the exhibitions, such as Cento Pittori via Margutta and paint-off demonstration. In the summer of 1993 he left Piazza Navona due to the encounters with a collector of works of art Don Agostino Chigi Albani della Rovere (1929–2002).

In 1990, he won first prizes in different editions of paint-off: in December 1996 he received the prize Artitalia at the Exhibition of Contemporary Art in Galleria l’Agostiniana in Rome; in 1995 he exposed the painting Scogliera in Notturno (English: Reef at Night) oil on canvas 50×60; in August 2000 he was awarded the first prize at the fourth edition of the competition of paint-off of Anticoli Corrado with a 50×60 oil on canvas painting depicting La Fonte Vecchia (English: The Old/Ancient Fount/Spring); between November 2000 and January 2001 he performed at the Galleria Gesù e Maria in Via del Corso in Rome, at the beginning with a solo exhibition then participated in the exhibition of painting and sculpture “Jubilee Events in time and in the present” organized in order to celebrate the closing of the Great Jubilee. On 13 December 2005 is recognized illustrious citizen from the Lazio region.

In 2006 Salvati met the critic Andrea De Liberi and his biography appeared in the journal Cultura published by Istituto Europeo delle Politiche Culturali ed Ambientali. In July 2009 in Trani he knew the art critic Paolo Levi, then artistic director of the Catalogue of Modern Art Giorgio Mondadori, and participated in the Biennial of Contemporary Art, exhibition curated by Giuseppe De Nittis foundation which takes place in rooms used for the exhibitions in Castello Svevo. On 20 and 21 October 2012, the pilot Andrea Palma, during the trial and race in the national racetrack in Monza, displayed a copy of a portrait painted by Salvati, a color print positioned on the bonnet of the Ferrari 430.

On 27 December 2012, on a proposal from the Presidency of the Council of Ministers, he has been honoured with the title of Knight of the Order of Merit of the Italian Republic. In 2019 the Paolo Salvati Onlus association was legally established, which supports the memory of the artist and holds the Paolo Salvati Archive, for the updating of the general catalog of the works.

== Gallery ==
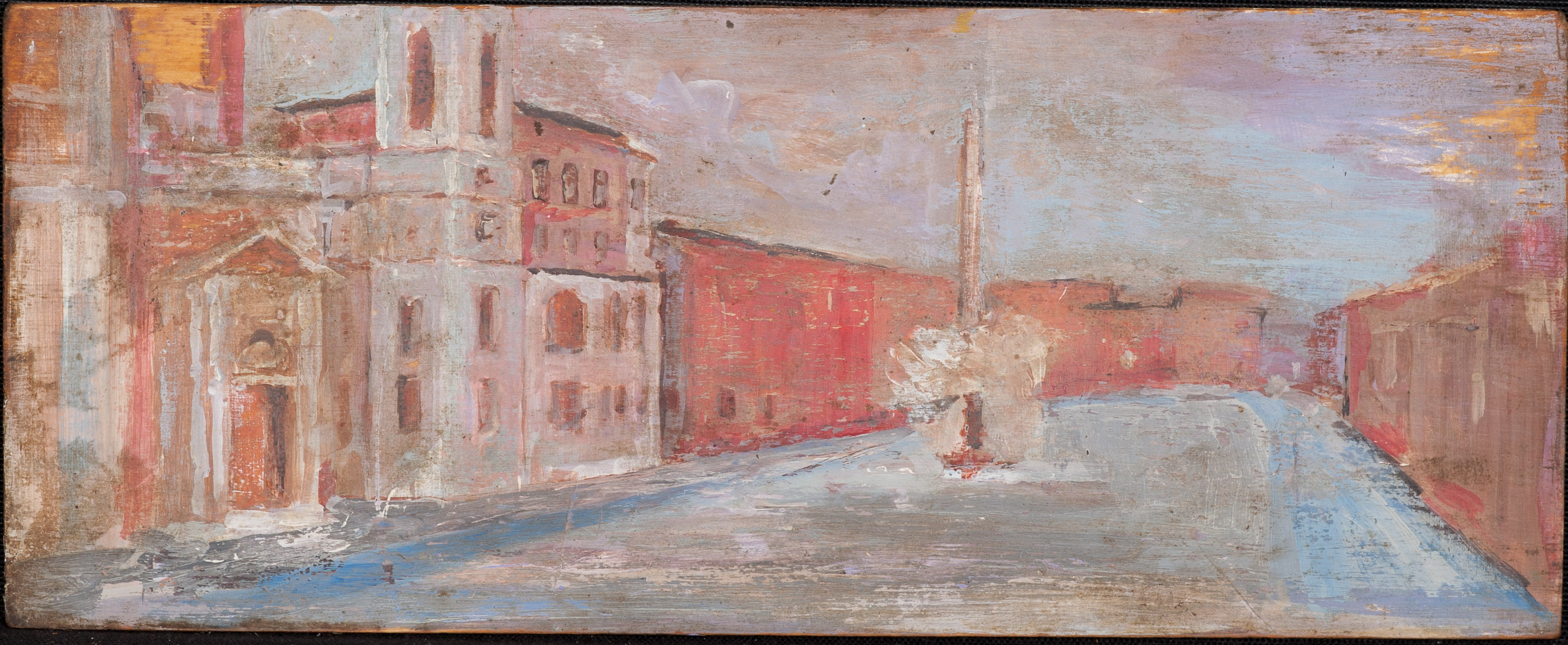
Paolo Salvati - Piazza Navona, 1962

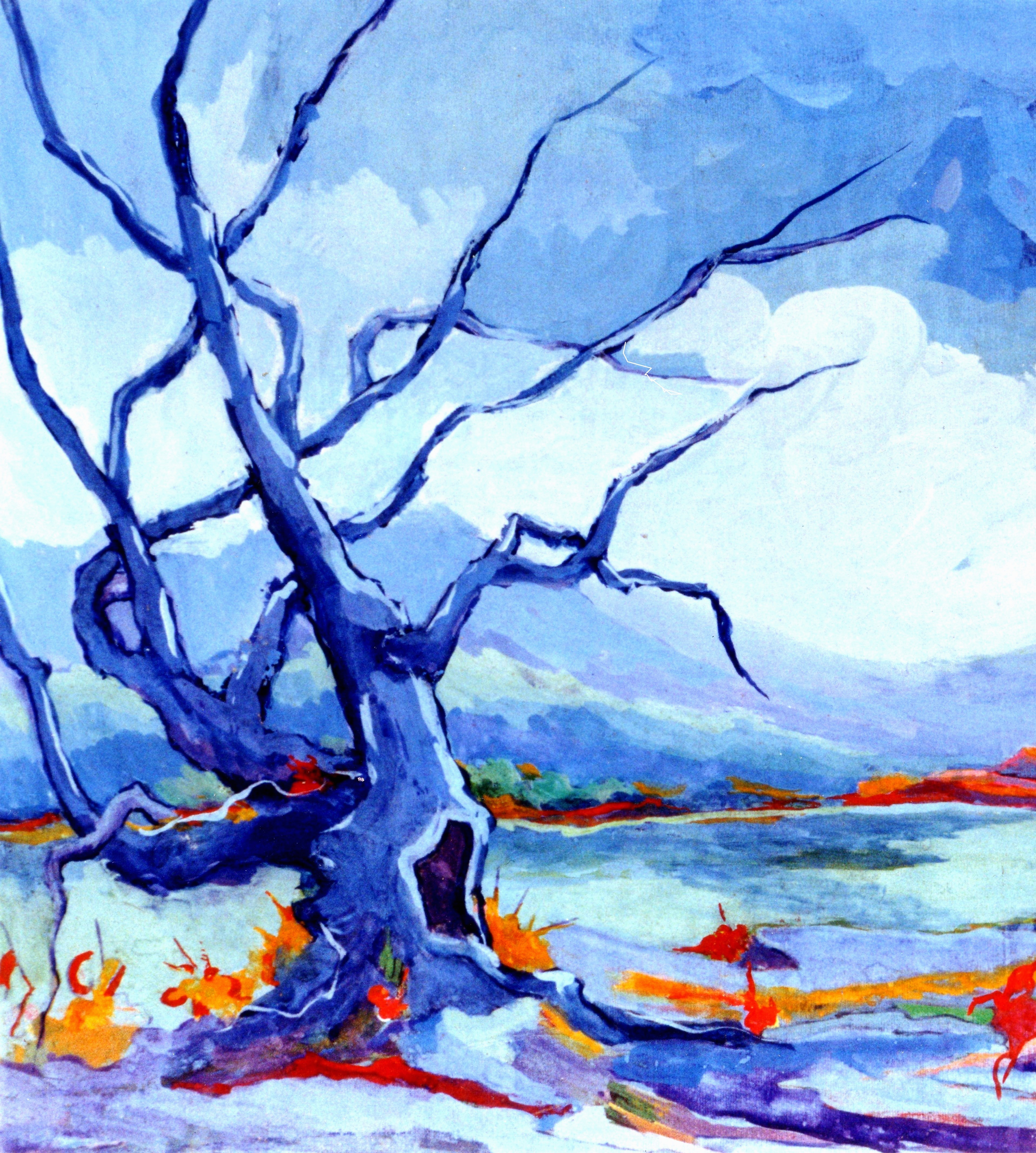
Paolo Salvati - Albero blu, 1980

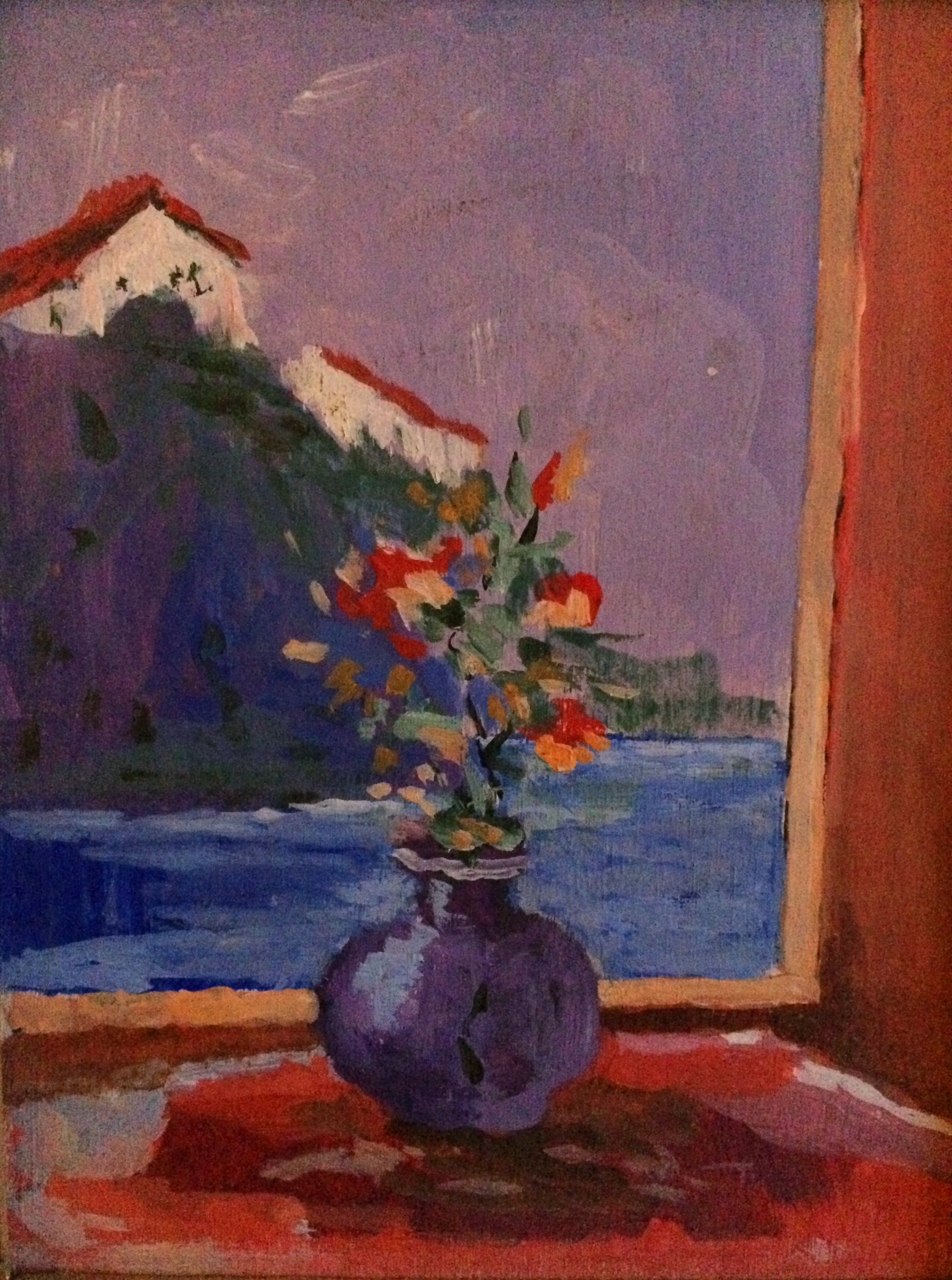
Paolo Salvati - Vaso di fiori, 1986

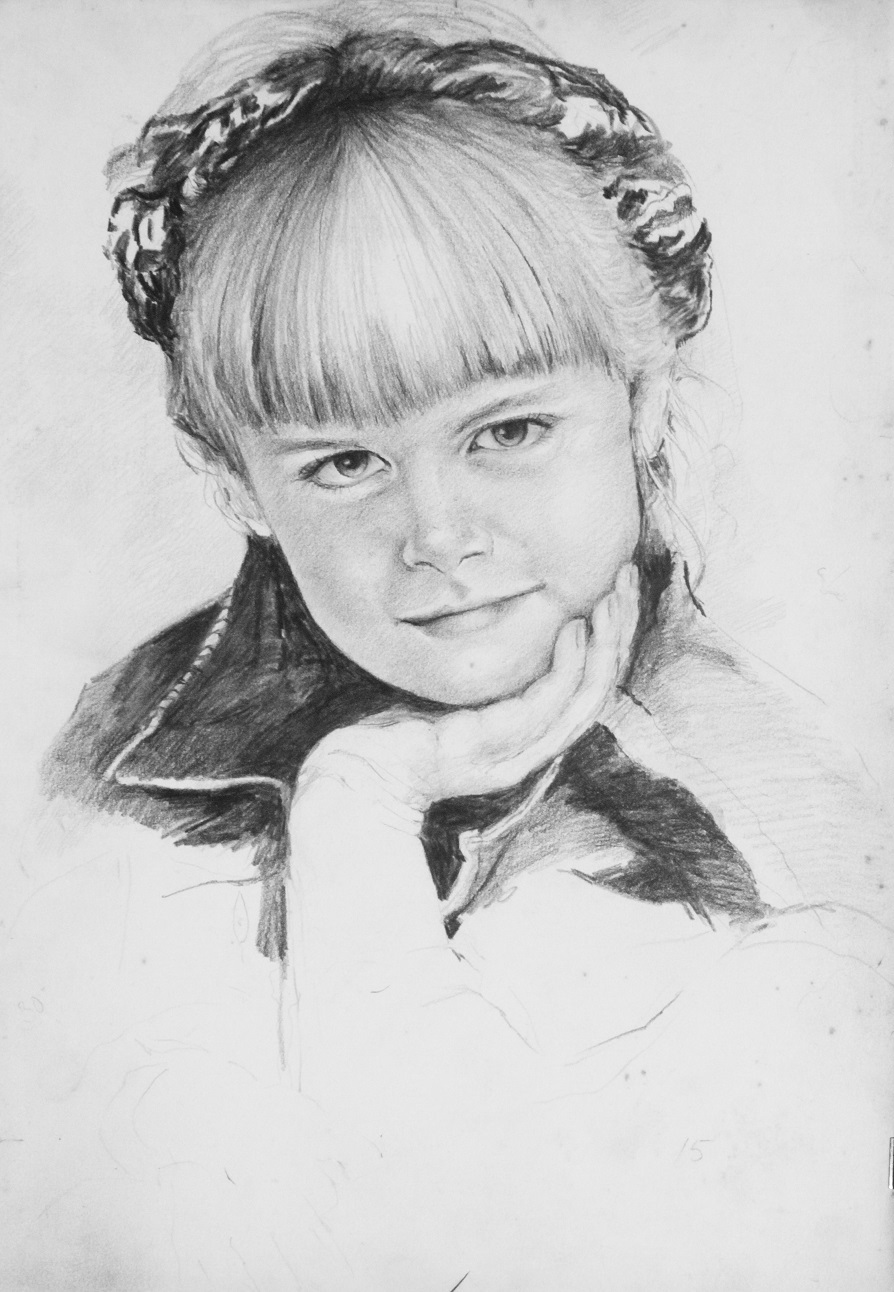
Paolo Salvati - Ritratto, 1990

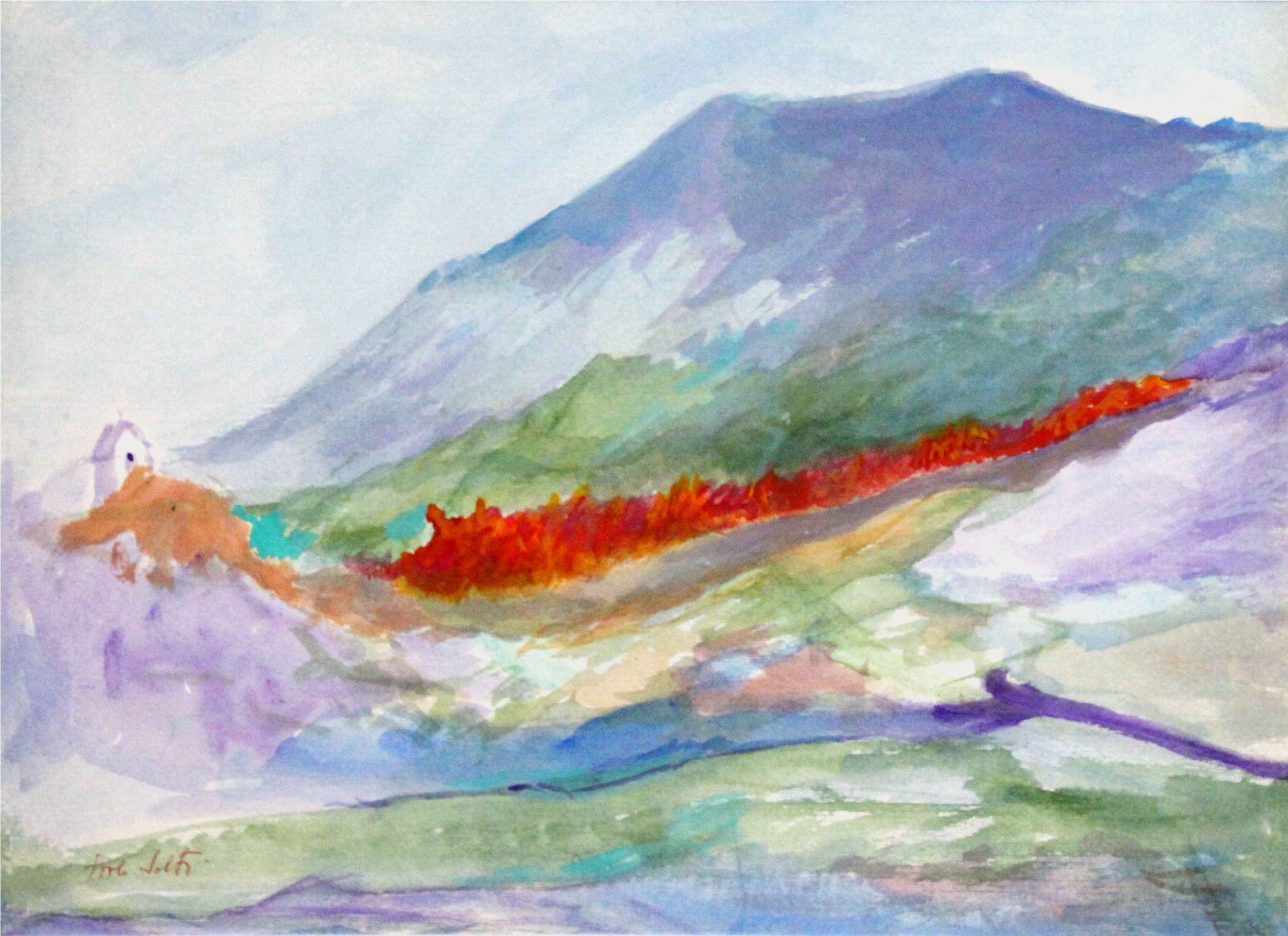
Paolo Salvati - Subjects figment of the imagination

== Bibliography ==
- Catalog of Modern Art No. 45, Paul Levi, Daniela Brignone; Mario Guderzo; Lea Mattarella, "The Italian Astist from the early twentieth century to today” (Gli Artisti Italiani dal Primo Novecento ad Oggi), Giorgio Mondadori, Milan, 2009, pp. 176–358. ISBN 978-88-6052-245-0.
- Catalog of Modern Art No. 46, Paul Levi, Daniela Brignone; Mario Guderzo; Lea Mattarella, "The Italian Artist from the early twentieth century to today" (Gli Artisti Italiani dal Primo Novecento ad Oggi), Giorgio Mondadori, Milan, 2010, pp. 192, 352–353. ISBN 978-88-6052-321-1.
- Catalog of Modern Art No. 47, in Paul Levi, Daniela Brignone; Mario Guderzo; Lea Mattarella, "The Italian Astist from the early twentieth century to today"( Gli Artisti Italiani dal Primo Novecento ad Oggi) Giorgio Mondadori, Milan, 2011, pp. 192–379. ISBN 978-88-6052-389-1.
- Catalog of Modern Art No 48, in Paul Levi Young Faccenda; Daniela Brignone; Mario Guderzo; Lea Mattarella, "The Italian Artist from the early twentieth century to today"(Gli Artisti Italiani dal Primo Novecento ad Oggi), Giorgio Mondadori, Milan, 2012, pp. 27, 392, 401–404. ISBN 978-88-6052-459-1.
- Catalog, (Paolo Salvati 1939-2014 : geniale creazione visiva) Eredi Salvati, Roma, 2016.
- Via Margutta Storia della Strada degli Artisti e dei Cento Pittori, in Luigi Salvatori, Eventi d'Arte Cento Pittori via Margutta, Roma, 2021. ISBN 979-12-80434-03-6
- Michela Ramadori, I dipinti raffiguranti la Pietra blu di Paolo Salvati, Ut pictura Poesis, Editions of Italian Modern and Contemporary Art Archives, Roma, 2021. ISBN 978-88-946055-0-1
- Alberto Moioli, Le marine di Paolo Salvati, Editions of Italian Modern and Contemporary Art Archives, Roma, 2022. ISBN 978-88-947049-9-0

== Paintings in museums ==
- Museum of Modern and Contemporary Art, Artists present at Anticoli between the 19th and 21st century of Anticoli Corrado.

== See also ==
- Expressionism
- Anticoli Corrado
- Cento Pittori via Margutta

== Other websites ==
- Official website
- Official website of Culture Lazio, Website of Culture, Arts and Sports of the Lazio Region
- Official page on Facebook
- Paolo Salvati, biography on Artprice.com
- Paolo Salvati, biography on Mutualart.com
- Paolo Salvati, biography on Askart.com
