= Michela Ramadori =

Italian art historian (born 1984)

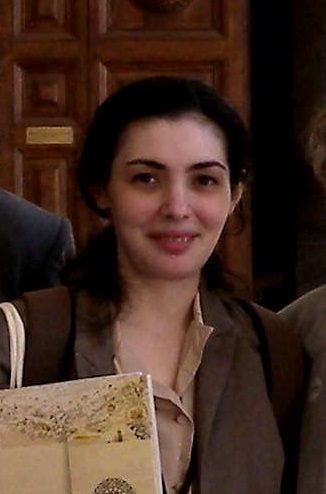
- Ramadori in 2017
- Born: 15 March 1984; Rome, Italy
- Education: University of Rome La Sapienza
- Occupation: Art historian

Michela Ramadori (born 15 March 1984 in Rome) is an Italian art historian, author and academic.

== Biography ==
Born in Rome, Italy, on March 15, 1984, she graduated in history of art and obtained diploma from the School of Specialization in Historical Artistic Heritage at Sapienza University of Rome. During the Specialization School she did an internship at the CARM, Collection of modern and contemporary art of Vatican Museums. Later on she obtained a Ph.D. in “Tools and methods for the history of art” at Sapienza University of Rome. The topic of her Ph.D. comes from the study of the display of Roman palaces of the Seventeenth and Eighteenth Centuries, of the “La Sapienza” University of Rome and the Getty Research Institute. She also obtained the II level master in “Management - promotion - technological innovations in the management of cultural heritage” at the Roma Tre University.

She taught “Art History Laboratory” at the Roma Tre University and was tutor for the 1st level Master in “Management for the enhancement of the cultural heritage” at Sapienza University of Rome. She is a Subject Expert in Museology, Art and Restoration Criticism at the Sapienza University of Rome. She is expert in “Museology, art and restoration criticism” approved by the Roma Tre University for the teaching and seminar activities of the two-year II level Master in Economics and Management of Cultural Heritage, at Department of Business Economics. She is “Expert in cataloging of movable finds and works of art able to translate his knowledge into useful features for the organization of digital archives”, “Expert of proven competence and qualified experience on information technologies applied to cultural heritage” and “Expert with proven competence and qualified experience, including professional, for IT innovation in the context of cultural heritage” approved by the Roma Tre University for the teaching and seminar activities of the Masters of the Department of Humanities. She is an editor and Referee of the BTA – Bollettino Telematico dell’Arte (ANVUR recognized scientific journal in Areas 8 and 10). She published the results of her investigations relating to museology and the history of medieval, modern and contemporary art in various monographs and numerous papers. Member of the Paolo Salvati documentary archive since 2019, he curates the general catalog.

== Publications ==
- Michela Ramadori, I dipinti raffiguranti la Pietra blu di Paolo Salvati, Ut pictura Poesis, Editions of Italian Modern and Contemporary Art Archives, Roma, 2021.ISBN 978-88-946055-0-1.
- Michela Ramadori, Cronaca di un cataclisma ed estetica del sublime: la stampa artistica dell’eruzione del Vesuvio di Jules Didier nel La terre et les mers ou description physique du globe di Louis Figuier (1866), in Stefania Nisio (Eds), Giornate di Geologia & Storia. Memorie Descrittive della Carta Geologica d’Italia, Dipartimento per il Servizio Geologico d’Italia, ISPRA, 108, 2021, pp. 289–296, ISBN 978-88-9311-0839, ISSN 0536-0242.
- Le reti liquide del patrimonio culturale e la partecipazione attiva degli utenti: potenzialità e rischi, in museum.dià, III Convegno Internazionale di Museologia. Reti creative. Paradigmi museali di produzione, gestione, comunicazione nell’era dell’iperconnettività, a cura di Francesco Pignataro, Simona Sanchirico e Christopher Smith, atti dell’Incontro Internazionale di Studi (Roma, Museo Nazionale Etrusco di Villa Giulia, 24-25 maggio 2018), Fondazione Dià Cultura, Roma, 2021, pp. 247–267, ISBN 978-88-946182-0-4.
- Michela Ramadori, Il dipinto inedito delle Tre Marie nella chiesa di San Berardo a Colli di Monte Bove. Arte, Neoplatonismo umanistico e Tomismo domenicano al tempo della Controriforma, 2020, ISBN 978-88-943410-3-4.
- Michela Ramadori, Leda partoriente, Presentazione delle uova e L’oracolo di Apollo: iconografia di due xilografie dell’Hypnerotomachia Poliphili, xilografie nn. 49 (a, b) e 50, in Icoxilòpoli 2. Iconografia delle xilografie del Polifilo, Bulzoni Editore, 2020, Roma, pp. 345–359, ISBN 978-88-6897-181-6.
- Michela Ramadori, La liquidità del paesaggio culturale: dalle tracce delle civiltà antiche ai segni della civiltà industriale, in Landscapes – Paesaggi culturali, a cura di Franco Cambi, Davide Mastroianni, Valentino Nizzo, Francesco Pignataro e Simona Sanchirico, atti della Giornata di Studi (Roma, Museo Nazionale Etrusco di Villa Giulia, il 30 maggio 2019), Fondazione Dià Cultura, Roma, 2021, pp. 567–581, ISBN 978-88-946182-2-8.
- L’arte per la società nell’era del consumismo, tra coscienza sociale ed ecologia. Contesto storico e percorso artistico di Mario Ramadori (1935-1998), 2017, ISBN 978-88-909856-7-6.
- La Strage degli Innocenti. Un dipinto post-risorgimentale a Pietrasecca di Carsoli, Pietrasecca di Carsoli (AQ), 2016, ISBN 978-88-909856-4-5.
- L’Assunzione della Vergine della chiesa di Santa Maria Assunta a Poggio Cinolfo. Un dipinto inedito di Agostino Masucci, Giuseppe Bottani e Stefano Pozzi, Pietrasecca di Carsoli (AQ), 2015, ISBN 978-88-909856-3-8.
- Arte e confraternite a Carsoli, intorno alla chiesa di Santa Vittoria. Dipinti del ‘600 commissionati dalle confraternite laicali carseolane e dalla Misericordia dell’Ordine dei Cavalieri di Malta, Pietrasecca di Carsoli (AQ), 2014, ISBN 978-88-909856-0-7.
- Iconografia francescana nella chiesa di Santa Maria delle Grazie a Pietrasecca di Carsoli. Dipinti di: seguaci dei Carracci, Giuseppe Guadagnoli, seguace di Francesco Solimena e Paolo de Matteis, bottega di Francesco Trevisani, Seguace dei Sarnelli e di Caspar David Friedrich, Pietrasecca di Carsoli (AQ), Associazione Culturale Lumen (onlus), 2012.
- Chiesa di S. Nicola a Colli di Monte Bove: dipinti del ‘500 nel ducato di Tagliacozzo, 2010.
- L’Annunziata di Riofreddo: il contesto storico, gli affreschi, gli artisti, 2009.
- Michela Ramadori, L’amore nella cultura antica attraverso lo sguardo rinascimentale di Francesco Colonna: due sue interpretazioni nella xilografia 50 dell’Hypnerotomachia Poliphili, in Archeologia e antropologia dell’amore, a cura di Valentino Nizzo, atti dell’Incontro Internazionale di Studi di Antropologia e Archeologia a confronto (Roma, Parco Regionale dell’Appia Antica – Ex Cartiere Latina, 26-28 Maggio 2017), Tomo II, Fondazione Dià Cultura, Roma, 2021, pp. 919–931, ISBN 978-88-946182-1-1.
- La rappresentazione dei Turchi nel XVII secolo: dai dipinti celebrativi di Palazzo Colonna ai SS. Apostoli a Roma, alle tele della chiesa di S. Vittoria a Carsoli nel ducato di Tagliacozzo, in Inclusioni culturali. Arte e architettura italiana in dialogo con altri mondi, edited by Bibiana Borzì and Lara Scanu, (Rome, Palazzo Barberini, 26 May 2017), Limena PD, libreriauniversitaria.it edizioni, 2019, pp. 63–85, ISBN 978-88-3359-169-8.
- La liquidità dell’informatica museale e delle arti contemporanee, Bollettino Telematico dell’Arte, n. 874, 8 Agosto 2019, ISSN 1127-4883.
- La caravaggesca Decollazione di San Giovanni Battista della chiesa di Santa Vittoria a Carsoli, caso esemplare di rapporti tra arti visive e teatro barocco, in il foglio di lumen, 52, 2018, pp. 5–8, ISSN 2284-0427.
- Un dipinto di eccezionale rarità iconografica: la Crocifissione nascosta dietro l’altare maggiore della chiesa di S. Nicola a Colli di Monte Bove, in il foglio di lumen, 51, 2018, pp. 6–10, ISSN 2284-0427.
- Il museo liquido: evoluzione storica, potenzialità, rischi. Il fattore tempo, fulcro della vita del museo, in museum.dià, II° Convegno Internazionale di Museologia. Chronos, Kairòs e Aion. Il tempo dei musei, edited by Francesco Pignataro, Simona Sanchirico and Christopher Smith, proceedings of conference (Rome, Museo Nazionale Romano alle Terme di Diocleziano, 26-28 maggio 2016), Roma, ESS Editorial Service System srl, 2018, pp. 781–804, ISBN 978-88-8444-182-9.
- Rapporto tra arte e terremoti: il caso esemplare dell’iconografia dell’Assunzione della Vergine di Poggio Cinolfo, in il foglio di lumen, 49, 2017, pp. 14–17, ISSN 2284-0427.
- Dall’iconografia pagana del sacrificio sull’ara di Cerere di Riofreddo al martirio di Santa Lucia nel dipinto della chiesa di S. Vittoria a Carsoli, in il foglio di lumen, 48, 2017, pp. 6–9, ISSN 2284-0427.
- Le iconografie di San Nicola di Bari e San Berardo sullo storico stendardo della Confraternita di San Berardo di Colli di Montebove, in il foglio di lumen, 46, 2016, pp. 8–11, ISSN 2284-0427.
- La rappresentazione dei Turchi: dalle tele della chiesa di S. Vittoria a Carsoli ai dipinti celebrativi di Palazzo Colonna ai SS. Apostoli a Roma, in il foglio di lumen, 45, 2016, pp. 2–5, ISSN 2284-0427.
- Il museo liquido: evoluzione storica, potenzialità, rischi, Bollettino Telematico dell’Arte, n. 807, 9 Maggio 2016, ISSN 1127-4883.
- Raccolte librarie, allestimenti e oggetti d’arte nei palazzi romani nel Seicento e nel Settecento, in In corso d’opera. Ricerche dei dottorandi in storia dell’arte della Sapienza, vol. 1, edited by Michele Nicolaci, Roma, Campisano Editore, 2015, pp. 189–197, figg. 77-80, ISBN 978-88-98229-59-8.
- Persistenze pagane nell’iconografia di Santa Lucia nei dipinti delle chiese parrocchiali di Carsoli e Oricola, in il foglio di lumen, 43, 2015, pp. 2–5, ISSN 2284-0427.
- Antinoo Hermes del Belvedere: simbologia antiquariale del potere e Controriforma con papa Paolo III Farnese, in BTA – Bollettino Telematico dell’Arte, n. 788, 3 Novembre 2015, ISSN 1127-4883.
- La Madonna con Bambino e Santi: un dipinto gotico internazionale nel santuario della Madonna dei Bisognosi a Pereto, in il foglio di lumen, 42, 2015, pp. 17–21, ISSN 2284-0427.
- Leda partoriente, Presentazione delle uova e L’oracolo di Apollo: iconografia di due xilografie dell’Hypnerotomachia Poliphili, Bollettino Telematico dell’Arte, n. 769, 3 Maggio 2015, ISSN 1127-4883.
- Un episodio di arte controriformata nella chiesa di San Nicola di Bari a Villa Romana: la Presentazione di Cristo al Tempio, in il foglio di lumen, 40, 2014, pp. 15–19, ISSN 2284-0427.
- La chiesa di San Pietro Eremita a Rocca di Botte, in il foglio di lumen, 39, 2014, pp. 12–24, ISSN 2284-0427.
- Committenza artistica dell’oratorio della SS. Annunziata di Riofreddo in relazione al matrimonio Colonna Trinci e situazione conservativa degli affreschi, in il foglio di lumen, 37, 2013, pp. 16–19.
- Il Grand Tour attraverso Pietrasecca, passando per il Carseolano, e la rappresentazione artistica del paesaggio, in il foglio di lumen, 36, 2013, pp. 22–25.
- La Madonna in trono con Bambino della chiesa di S. Giorgio a Pereto: affresco manierista, in il foglio di lumen, 31, 2011, pp. 12–17.
- La Madonna del Suffragio delle Anime del Purgatorio a Pietrasecca di Carsoli, in il foglio di lumen, 28, 2010, pp. 8–12.
- Un dipinto angioino in Santa Maria in Cellis, in il foglio di lumen, 27, 2010, pp. 20–23.
- La Madonna del Rosario di Colli di Montebove: ringraziamento per la vittoria nella battaglia di Lepanto, in il foglio di lumen, 25, 2009, pp. 2–6.
- Gli affreschi dell’Annunziata di Riofreddo: lavori e studi in corso, “il foglio di lumen”, 24, 2009, pp. 20–21.
