= Rogovići =

Rogovići may refer to:

- Rogovići, Kaštelir-Labinci, a village in the Kaštelir-Labinci municipality, Istria, Croatia
- Rogovići (Pazin), a former hamlet now part of Pazin, Istria, Croatia
