= Babići =

Babići may refer to the following places:

- Babići (Gračanica), village in the municipality of Gračanica, Bosnia and Herzegovina
- Babići, Kaštelir-Labinci, Croatia
- Babići (Umag), Croatia
- Babići, a place in Plužine, Montenegro

== See also ==
- Babiči, Slovenia
