= Tadini (disambiguation) =

Tadini may refer to:

- Tadini, a village in Kaštelir-Labinci municipality in Istria County, Croatia
- Tadini (ophthalmologist), an 18th-century Italian ophthalmologist
- Alessandro Tadini (b. 1973), an Italian professional golfer
- Arcangelo Tadini (1846 – 1912), an Italian Roman Catholic priest and saint

== See also ==
- Accademia di Belle Arti Tadini, in Lovere, Province of Bergamo, Italy
