= Croatia–Italy relations =

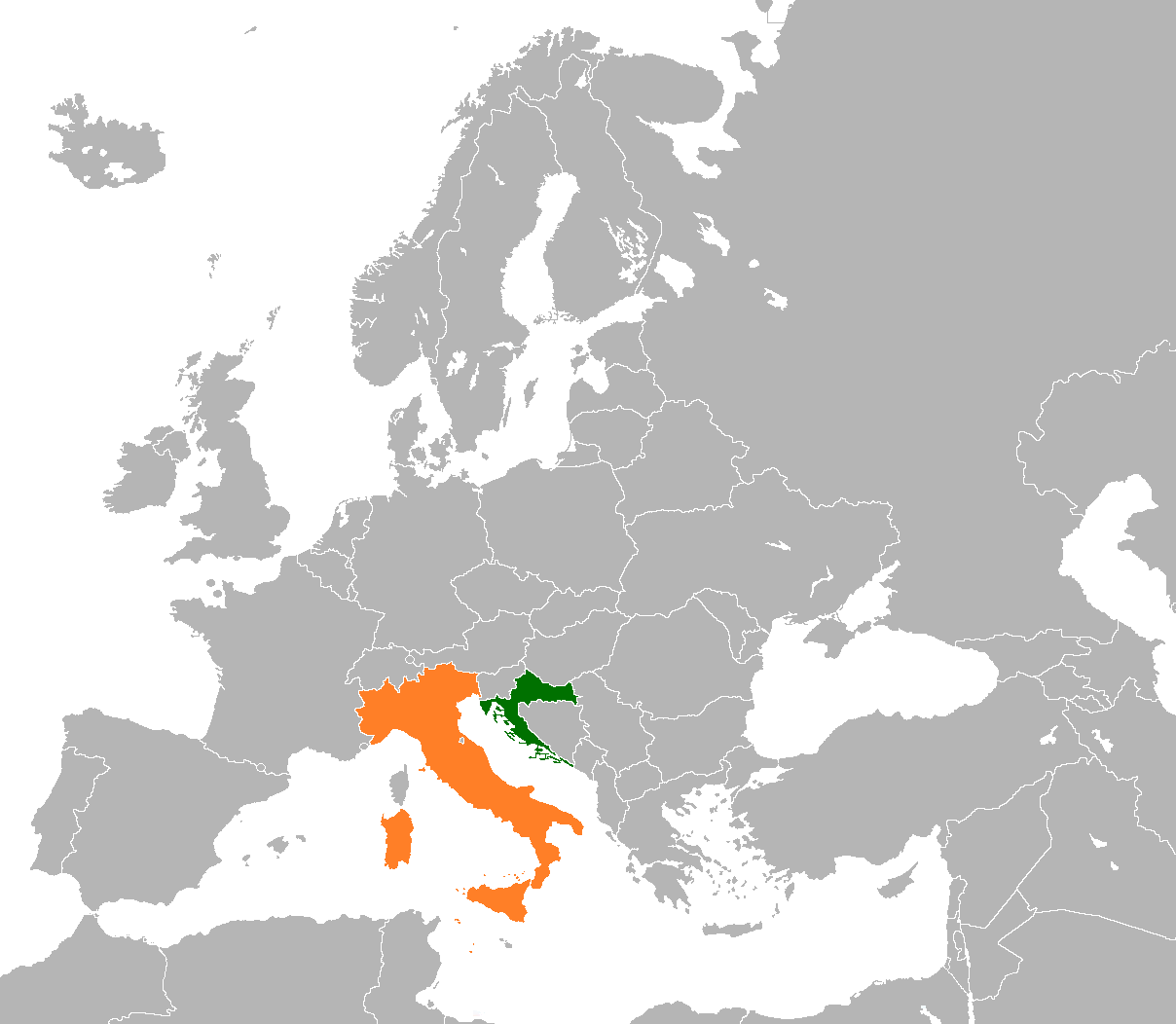

- Croatia: Italy

Diplomatic mission
- Embassy of Croatia, Rome: Embassy of Italy, Zagreb

Envoy
- Ambassador Jasen Mesić: Ambassador; Paolo Trichilo

The foreign relations between Croatia and Italy are commenced in 1992, following the independence of Croatia. Relations are warm and friendly with robust bilateral collaboration. The two nations have strong connectivity through tourism, immigration, foreign aid, and economic mutualism.

Italian is an official language in Croatia's Istria County (Istrian Italians), while Molise Croats inhabit the Italian city of Campobasso. The close multiculturalism between Croatia and Italy is broadly popular and favored domestically. Croatia and Italy are close military allies, especially through their naval and coastal forces, with membership in NATO. They share a 370 nautical-mile maritime border over the Adriatic Sea, with a small 12 mile region of Slovenia separating them by land.

Both countries are members of the European Union and Council of Europe, sharing the same official currency, the euro (€). Croatia has an embassy in Rome and general consulates in Milan and Trieste while Italy maintains an embassy in Zagreb and a general consulate in Rijeka, among other cultural organizations.

== History ==
=== Origins ===
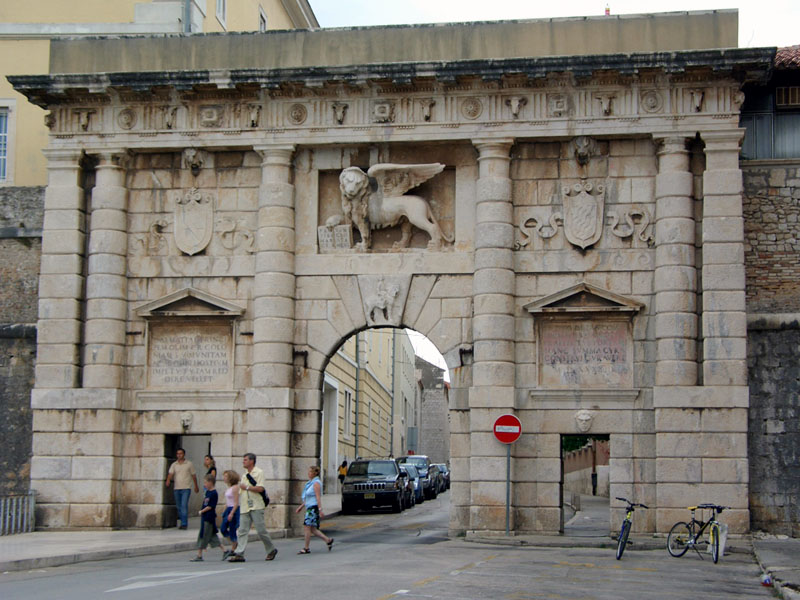
The Porta Terraferma in Zadar, Croatia, featuring the Lion of Saint Mark, a symbol of Veneto, Italy.

Italy and Croatia, due to their geographic proximity, have shared a rich and complex history reaching back to the Roman Empire, of which they were both apart. Northeast Italy and Northwest Croatia were combined by Roman emperor Augustus into Venetia et Histria from 7 AD–292 AD. During the reign of Roman emperor Hadrian from 117 to 138, most of modern Italy and Croatia remained separate and constituted the historic regions of Italia and Dalmatia, respectively. Croatia's Dalmatian coast was part of the Republic of Venice from 1409 to 1797, known then as Venetian Dalmatia.

After the fall of the Republic of Venice, the Treaty of Campo Formio transferred the region to the Austrian Habsburg Empire as the Venetian Province. The territories of the Venetian Republic were controlled by the Austrian Empire, until they were mostly (with the exclusion of all territories beyond the region of modern day Veneto and some parts of western Friuli) annexed by the newly established Kingdom of Italy. Croatia is considered Italy's strongest historical partner within the Slavic world. Unlike other Slavic countries, Croatia shares Italy's dominant religion – Roman Catholicism. Croatian towns and cities near Italy have historically spoken Italian. During their respective nation-building during the 19th century, their relations were favorable.

=== 20th century ===
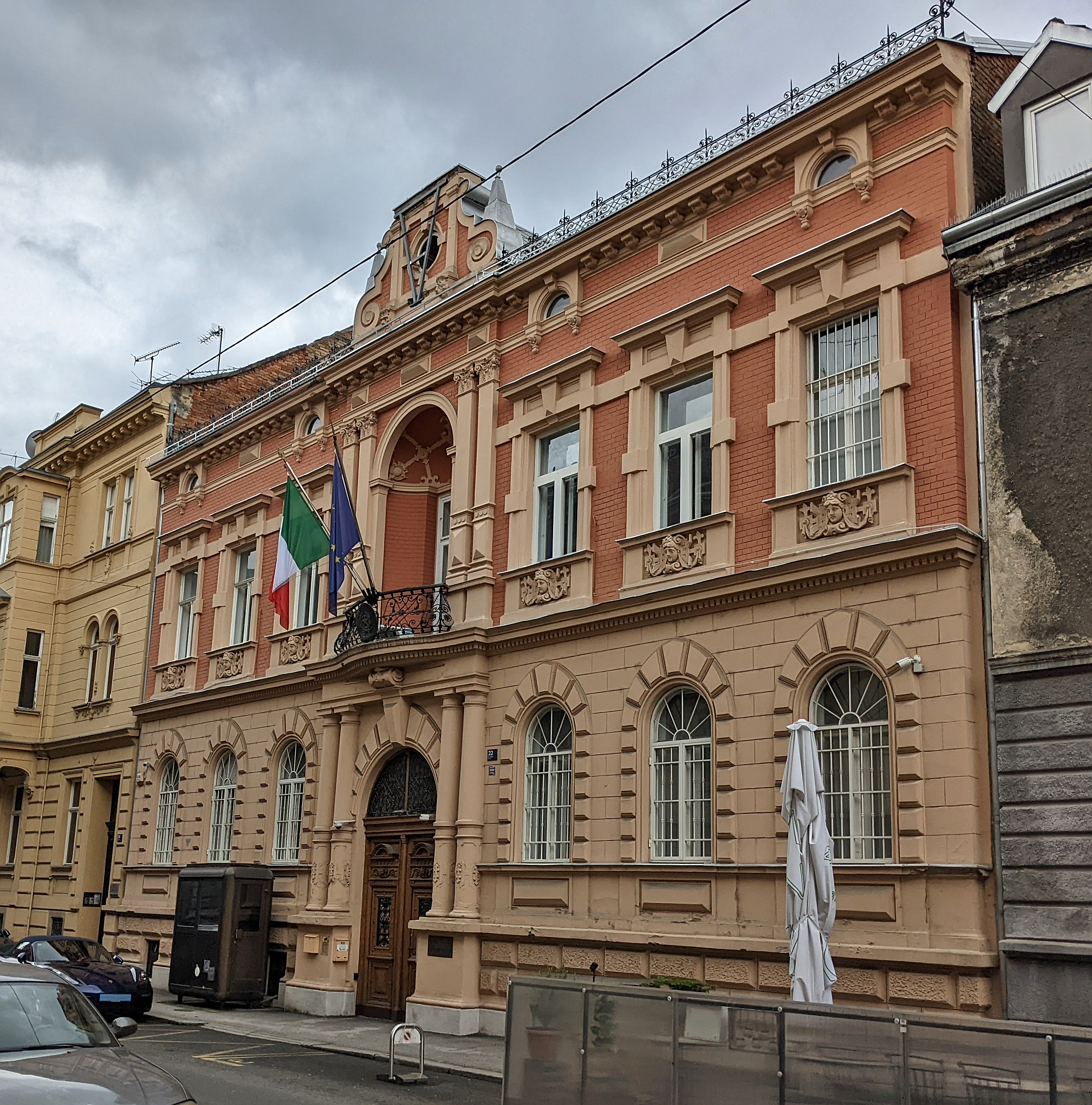
Italian Embassy in Zagreb, 2022

Tensions emerged during World War II in Italy, after the rise of Benito Mussolini led to a full-scale invasion of Croatia. Native Croatians were forced to italianize, with Italy exerting direct control of the short-lived Governorate of Dalmatia in 1941. Croatian and Slovenian populations were interned by Italian forces in concentration camps such as the Rab concentration camp where thousands were killed as part of the ethnic cleansing of slavs from Italian controlled regions of Istria and Dalmatia. Yugoslav communist revolutionary Josip Broz Tito repelled the Italians out of Croatia and counter-invaded part of Italy. Around 230,000 - 350,000 Italian occupiers and indigenous Italians, as well as Croats and Slovenes that maintained Italian citizenship, fled their native lands after the Yugoslav reprisal invasion. This was known as the Istrian–Dalmatian exodus. The eventual dissolution of Yugoslavia during the 1990s, normalized relations between Croatia and Italy.

=== Modern relations ===
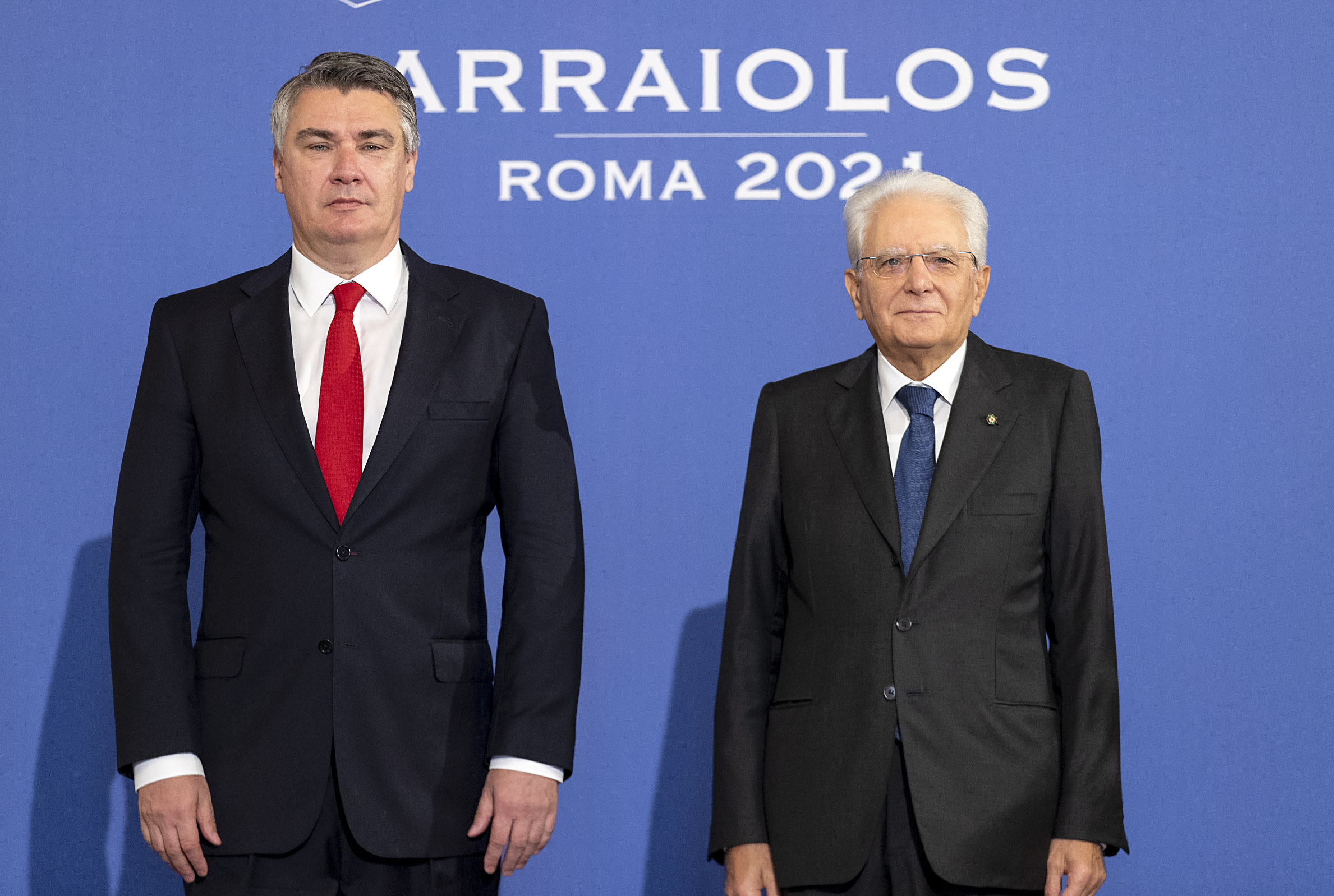
Croatian President Zoran Milanović with Italian President Sergio Mattarella in 2021

Following Croatia's independence, Italy re-established relations in 1992. Italy was a key partner to Croatia following its statehood, providing critical political and economic support during the 2000s. In 2007, Italy's president Giorgio Napoletano strained diplomatic relations by referring to the Yugoslav communist Partisans’ expulsions of Italians during the end of World War II, as the "barbarism of the century". This led to Croatia and Slovenia condemning the comment. Croatian president Stjepan Mesić accused Napoletano of historical revisionism but the nations' diplomats quickly resolved the matter in Rome.

Italy supported Croatia's admission to the European Union in 2013. A diplomatic row emerged between the two states in 2019, after Antonio Tajani, the President of the European Parliament, commented "Long live Trieste, long live Italian Istria, long live Italian Dalmatia, long live Italian exiles". Tajani later apologized to the Croatian government clarifying his comments were not intended to imply that the Istrian and Dalmatian regions of Croatia were a part of Italy. In 2023, after a decade of strong economic activity, Italy became Croatia's most important trading partner with a 45% increase since 2021, according to Tajani. That year, the two nations signed a tri-party agreement with Slovenia to ease immigration in Southeast Europe. Italy helped return a rare and "extremely valuable" 14th-century religious cross to Croatia, after a private citizen inadvertently bought it during an auction in London.

== Diaspora ==
There are around 19,500 people of Italian descent living in Croatia. There are also around 6,000 Molise Croats in Italy. In addition, there are around 21,000 registered immigrant Croatian workers in Italy. Italian is an officially-recognized language in Croatia, with the majority of its speakers living in Istria County. Dalmatian Italians historically constituted a significant population of Dalmatia. Italian is a popular foreign language in Croatia, with 14% of Croatians able to speak it well enough to have a conversation, according to Eurobarometer.

== Military cooperation ==
Croatia and Italy are close military allies, especially through their naval and coastal forces. Both are members of NATO, effectively establishing a defense pact between the two countries through Article 5. The Italian Air Force temporarily protected Croatian airspace in 2024 while the Croatian Air Force completed aircraft maintenance and completed a procurement of 12 new fighter jets from France.

== Trade ==
The two countries share multiple bilateral free-trade agreements. Croatia exports around 14% of their total annual export to Italy. Trade between the two states totaled €8.64 billion in 2023, reaching an all-time high.

== Fishing ==
Croatia and Italy both maintain exclusive economic zones over the Adriatic Sea. Italy disputed the reach of Croatia's zone around the Italian part of the Adriatic in January 2008 claiming it violated an earlier agreement they made over "Ecological and Fisheries Protection Zones". The two states mutually settled the dispute later that year. This zone is supervised by the Croatian Navy, which intercepted two Italian ships in 2008 and 2021, seizing their illegal fish, and escorting them back to Italian waters.

== Diplomatic missions ==
Croatia has an embassy in Rome, general consulates in Milan and Trieste, and consulates in Bari, Florence, Naples, and Padua. Italy has an embassy in Zagreb, general consulate in Rijeka, Vice Consulate in Buje, Pula and Split, as well as Italian Cultural Institute and Foreign Trade Institute in Zagreb.

== Sister cities ==
Croatia and Italy share a large number of sister cities between themselves. Many of these cities have Croatian and Italian-language versions of their name due to historic cultural diffusion.

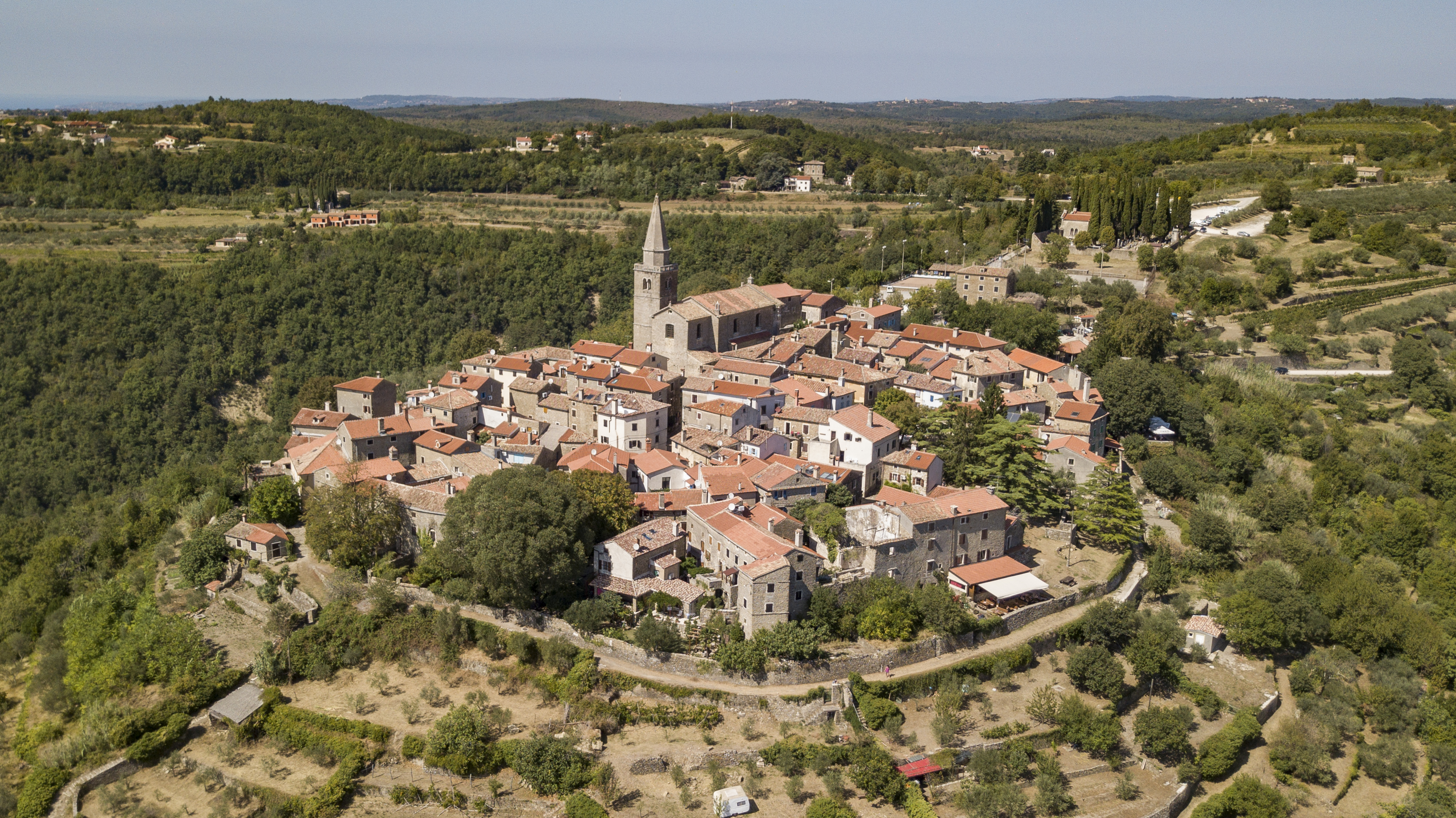
The town Grožnjan in Croatia is majority Italian-speaking and is locally known as Grisignana.

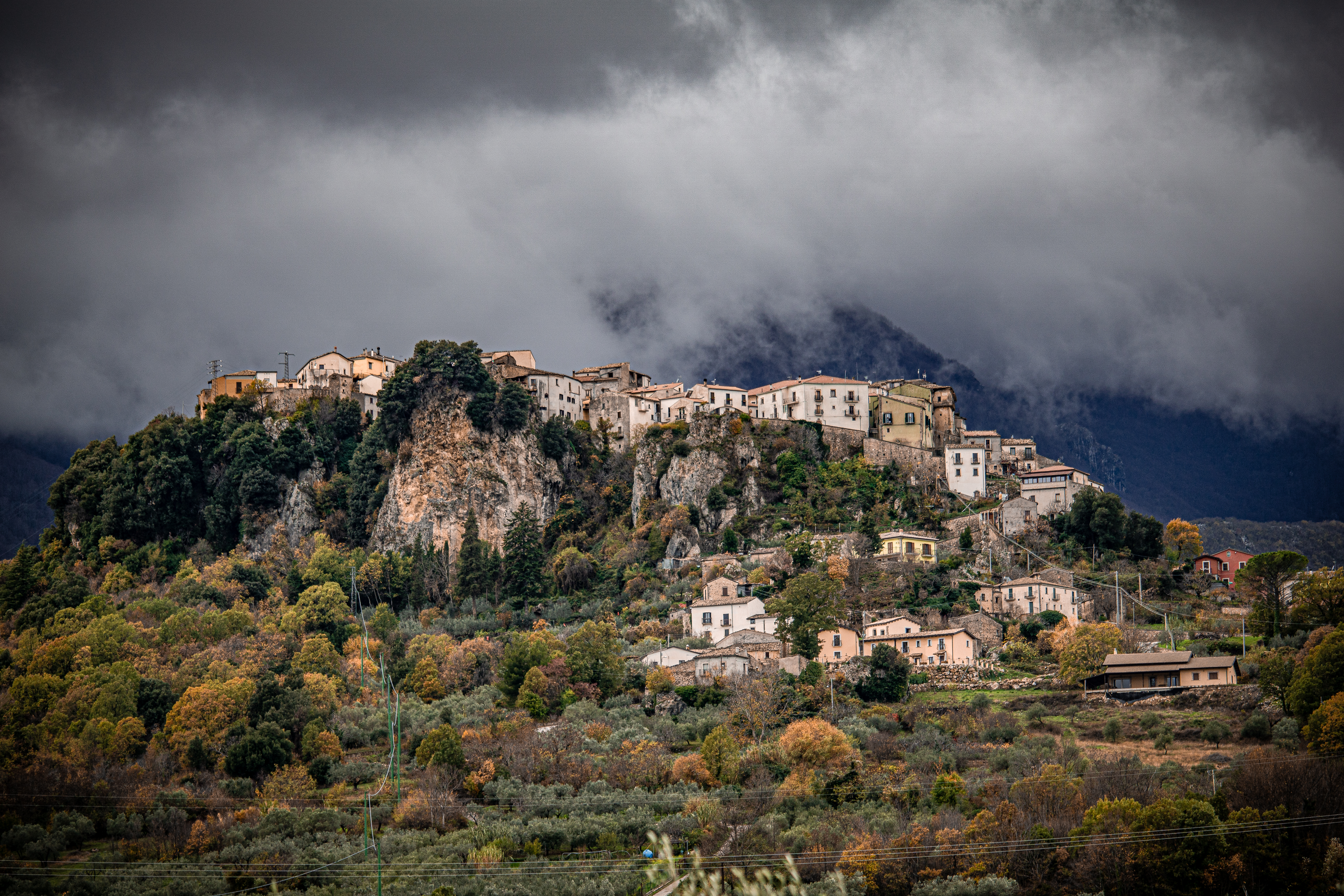
Molise Croats live in the Molise region of Italy.

- (Croatia) Biograd and (Italy) Porto San Giorgio
- (Croatia) Bjelovar and (Italy) Ascoli Piceno / (Italy) Rubiera
- (Croatia) Crikvenica and (Italy) Verbania
- (Croatia) Dubrovnik and (Italy) Venezia / (Italy) Ragusa / (Italy) Ravenna
- (Croatia) Karlovac and (Italy) Alessandria
- (Croatia) Križevci and (Italy) Reana del Rojale
- (Croatia) Labin and (Italy) Carbonia / (Italy) Manzano / (Italy) Sospirolo
- (Croatia) Lipik and (Italy) Abano Terme
- (Croatia) Matulji and (Italy) Castel San Pietro Terme
- (Croatia) Medulin and (Italy) Montecarotto / (Italy) Porto Tolle
- (Croatia) Novigrad and (Italy) Sacile
- (Croatia) Omiš and (Italy) San Felice del Molise
- (Croatia) Opatija and (Italy) Carmagnola / (Italy) Castel San Pietro Terme
- (Croatia) Osijek and (Italy) Vicenza
- (Croatia) Pag and (Italy) Carbonera / (Italy) Zanè
- (Croatia) Poreč and (Italy) Massa Lombarda / (Italy) Monselice / (Italy) Segrate
- (Croatia) Pula and (Italy) Imola / (Italy) Verona
- (Croatia) Rijeka and (Italy) Este / (Italy) Faenza / (Italy) Genoa / (Italy) Trieste
- (Croatia) Samobor and (Italy) Parabiago
- (Croatia) Šibenik and (Italy) Civitanova Marche / (Italy) Muggia / (Italy) San Benedetto del Tronto
- (Croatia) Slunj and (Italy) Castel San Giovanni
- (Croatia) Split and (Italy) Ancona
- (Croatia) Tisno and (Italy) Bucine
- (Croatia) Trogir and (Italy) Montesilvano / (Italy) Porto Sant'Elpidio / (Italy) Tione di Trento
- (Croatia) Varaždin and (Italy) Montale
- (Croatia) Vinkovci and (Italy) Camponogara
- (Croatia) Zadar and (Italy) Ancona / (Italy) Padua / (Italy) Reggio Emilia
- (Croatia) Zagreb and (Italy) Bologna / (Italy) Molise

== See also ==
- Foreign relations of Croatia
- Foreign relations of Italy
- Italian language in Croatia
- Croats of Italy
- Italians of Croatia
