= Mekiši kod Kaštelira =

Mekiši kod Kaštelira Mechissi
- Village
- Location within Croatia
- Coordinates: 45°18′43″N 13°41′20″E
- Country: Croatia
- County: Istria County
- Municipality: Kaštelir-Labinci

Area
  - Total: 0.46 sq mi (1.2 km^{2})

Population (2021)
  - Total: 9
  - Density: 19/sq mi (7.5/km^{2})
- Time zone: UTC+1 (CET)
  - Summer (DST): UTC+2 (CEST)
- Postal code: 52464 Kaštelir
- Area code: 052

Mekiši kod Kaštelira (Italian: Mechissi) is a small village in Kaštelir-Labinci municipality in Istria County, Croatia.

== Demographics ==
According to the 2021 census, its population was just 9. It was 21 in 2011.
