= Krančići =

Krančići Cocianci
- Village
- Location within Croatia
- Coordinates: 45°18′14″N 13°41′46″E
- Country: Croatia
- County: Istria County
- Municipality: Kaštelir-Labinci

Area
  - Total: 0.35 sq mi (0.9 km^{2})

Population (2021)
  - Total: 81
  - Density: 230/sq mi (90/km^{2})
- Time zone: UTC+1 (CET)
  - Summer (DST): UTC+2 (CEST)
- Postal code: 52464 Kaštelir
- Area code: 052

Krančići (Italian: Cocianci) is a village in Kaštelir-Labinci municipality in Istria County, Croatia.

== Demographics ==
According to the 2021 census, its population was 81. It was 73 in 2011.
