= Kovači, Kaštelir-Labinci =

Kovači Covaz
- Village
- Location within Croatia
- Coordinates: 45°18′07″N 13°40′41″E
- Country: Croatia
- County: Istria County
- Municipality: Kaštelir-Labinci

Area
  - Total: 0.54 sq mi (1.4 km^{2})

Population (2021)
  - Total: 65
  - Density: 120/sq mi (46/km^{2})
- Time zone: UTC+1 (CET)
  - Summer (DST): UTC+2 (CEST)
- Postal code: 52464 Kaštelir
- Area code: 052

Kovači (Italian: Covaz) is a village in Kaštelir-Labinci municipality in Istria County, Croatia.

== Demographics ==
According to the 2021 census, its population was 65. It was 52 in 2011.
