= Labinci =

Labinci Santa Domenica
- Village
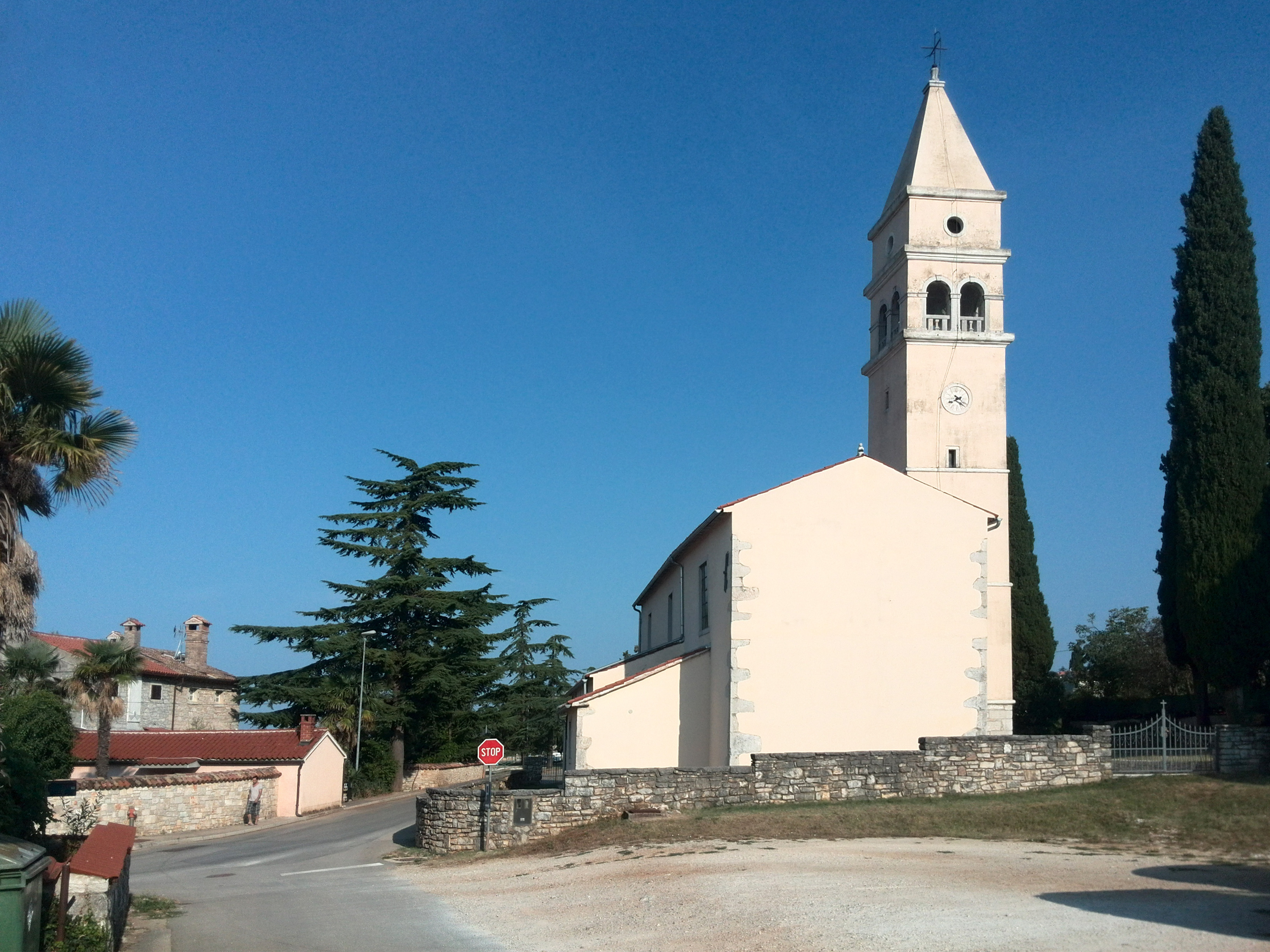

- Location within Croatia
- Coordinates: 45°18′29″N 13°41′31″E
- Country: Croatia
- County: Istria County
- Municipality: Kaštelir-Labinci

Area
  - Total: 1.2 sq mi (3.0 km^{2})

Population (2021)
  - Total: 315
  - Density: 270/sq mi (110/km^{2})
- Time zone: UTC+1 (CET)
  - Summer (DST): UTC+2 (CEST)
- Postal code: 52464 Kaštelir
- Area code: 052

Labinci (Italian: Santa Domenica) is a village in Kaštelir-Labinci municipality in Istria County, Croatia.

== Demographics ==
According to the 2021 census, its population was 315. It was 294 in 2011.
