= Cerjani =

Cerjani Ceriani
- Village
- Location within Croatia
- Coordinates: 45°19′37″N 13°41′20″E
- Country: Croatia
- County: Istria County
- Municipality: Kaštelir-Labinci

Area
  - Total: 2.3 sq mi (5.9 km^{2})

Population (2021)
  - Total: 22
  - Density: 9.7/sq mi (3.7/km^{2})
- Time zone: UTC+1 (CET)
  - Summer (DST): UTC+2 (CEST)
- Postal code: 52464 Kaštelir
- Area code: 052

Cerjani (Italian: Ceriani) is a village in Kaštelir-Labinci municipality in Istria County, Croatia.

== Demographics ==
According to the 2021 census, its population was 22. It was 20 in 2011.
