= Brnobići, Kaštelir-Labinci =

Brnobići Bernobi
- Village
- Location within Croatia
- Coordinates: 45°18′00″N 13°41′10″E
- Country: Croatia
- County: Istria County
- Municipality: Kaštelir-Labinci

Area
  - Total: 0.077 sq mi (0.2 km^{2})

Population (2021)
  - Total: 156
  - Density: 2,000/sq mi (780/km^{2})
- Time zone: UTC+1 (CET)
  - Summer (DST): UTC+2 (CEST)
- Postal code: 52464 Kaštelir
- Area code: 052

Brnobići (Italian: Bernobi) is a village in Kaštelir-Labinci municipality in Istria County, Croatia.

== Demographics ==
According to the 2021 census, its population was 156. It was 152 in 2011.
