= Deklići =

Deklići Decli
- Village
- Location within Croatia
- Coordinates: 45°18′18″N 13°40′16″E
- Country: Croatia
- County: Istria County
- Municipality: Kaštelir-Labinci

Area
  - Total: 2.4 sq mi (6.3 km^{2})

Population (2021)
  - Total: 34
  - Density: 14/sq mi (5.4/km^{2})
- Time zone: UTC+1 (CET)
  - Summer (DST): UTC+2 (CEST)
- Postal code: 52464 Kaštelir
- Area code: 052

Deklići (Italian: Decli) is a village in Kaštelir-Labinci municipality in Istria County, Croatia.

== Demographics ==
According to the 2021 census, its population was 34. It was 38 in 2011.
