= Dvori, Croatia =

Dvori Ciòlin
- Village
- Location within Croatia
- Coordinates: 45°17′19″N 13°40′35″E
- Country: Croatia
- County: Istria County
- Municipality: Kaštelir-Labinci

Area
  - Total: 3.5 sq mi (9.1 km^{2})

Population (2021)
  - Total: 62
  - Density: 18/sq mi (6.8/km^{2})
- Time zone: UTC+1 (CET)
  - Summer (DST): UTC+2 (CEST)
- Postal code: 52464 Kaštelir
- Area code: 052

Dvori (Italian: Ciòlin) is a village in Kaštelir-Labinci municipality in Istria County, Croatia.

== Demographics ==
According to the 2021 census, its population was 62. It was 51 in 2011.
