= Italians of Croatia =

Historical national minority in Croatia

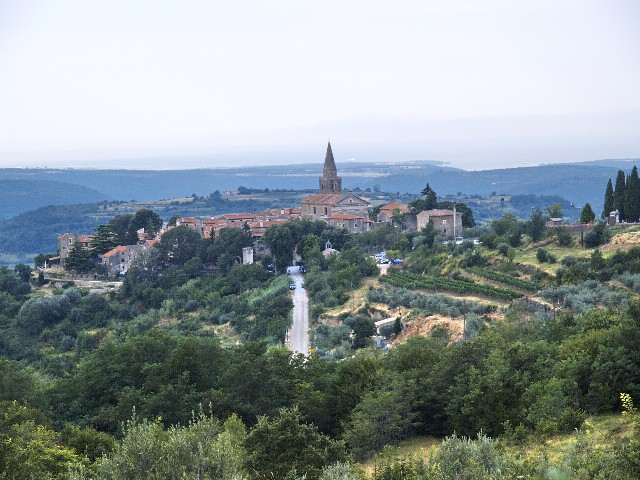
The village of Grožnjan/Grisignana is the only municipality in Croatia with a majority Italian speaking population

Italians of Croatia are an autochthonous historical national minority recognized by the Constitution of Croatia. As such, they elect a special representative to the Croatian Parliament. There is the Italian Union of Croatia and Slovenia (Croatian: Talijanska Unija, Slovene: Italijanska Unija), which is a Croatian-Slovenian joint organization with its main site in Rijeka, Croatia and its secondary site in Koper, Slovenia.

There are two main groups of Italians in Croatia, based on geographical origin:

- Istrian Italians
- Dalmatian Italians

Their numbers drastically decreased following the Istrian–Dalmatian exodus (1943–1960). According to the 2021 Croatian census, the Italians of Croatia number 13,763, or 0.36% of the total Croatian population. They mostly reside in the county of Istria. The Italian language is co-officially used in eighteen Croatian municipalities.

== History ==
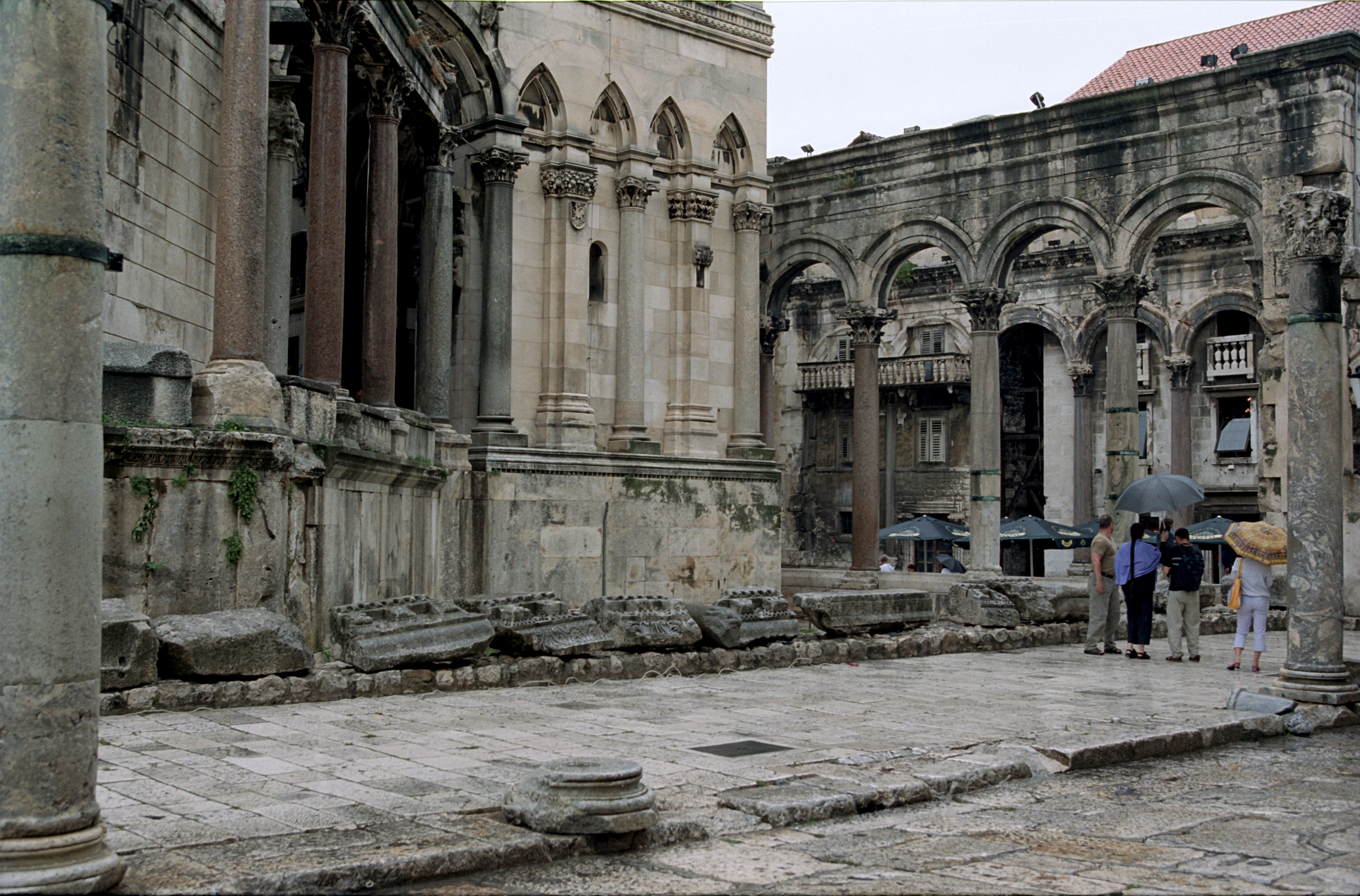
Palace of the Roman Emperor Diocletian, Split

Roman Dalmatia was fully Latinized by 476 AD when the Western Roman Empire disappeared. In the Early Middle Ages, the territory of the Byzantine province of Dalmatia reached in the North up to the river Sava, and was part of the Praetorian prefecture of Illyricum. In the middle of the 6th and the beginning of the 7th century began the Slavic migrations to the Balkans, which caused the Romance-speaking population, descendants of Romans and Illyrians (speaking Dalmatian), to flee to the coast and islands. The hinterland, semi-depopulated by the Barbarian Invasions, Slavic tribes settled. The Dalmatian cities retained their Romanic culture and language in cities such as Zadar, Split and Dubrovnik. Their own Vulgar Latin, developed into Dalmatian, a now extinct Romance language. These coastal cities (politically part of the Byzantine Empire) maintained political, cultural and economic links with Italy, through the Adriatic Sea. On the other side communications with the mainland were difficult because of the Dinaric Alps. Due to the sharp orography of Dalmatia, even communications between the different Dalmatian cities, occurred mainly through the sea. This helped Dalmatian cities to develop a unique Romance culture, despite the mostly Slavicized mainland.

Historian Theodor Mommsen wrote that Istria (included in the Regio X Venetia et Histria of Roman Italy since Augustus) was fully romanized in the 5th century AD. Between 500 and 700 AD, Slavs settled in Southeastern Europe (Eastern Adriatic), and their number ever increased, and with the Ottoman invasion Slavs were pushed from the south and east. This led to Italic people becoming ever more confined to urban areas, while some areas of the countryside were populated by Slavs, with exceptions in western and southern Istria which remained fully Romance-speaking.

By the 11th century, most of the interior mountainous areas of northern and eastern Istria (Liburnia) were inhabited by South Slavs, while the Romance population continued to prevail in the south and west of the peninsula. Linguistically, the Romance inhabitants of Istria were most probably divided into two main linguistic groups: in the north-west, the speakers of a Rhaeto-Romance language similar to Ladin and Friulian prevailed, while in the south, the natives most probably spoke a variant of the Dalmatian language. One modern claim suggests the original language of the romanized Istrians survived the invasions, this being the Istriot language which was spoken by some near Pula.

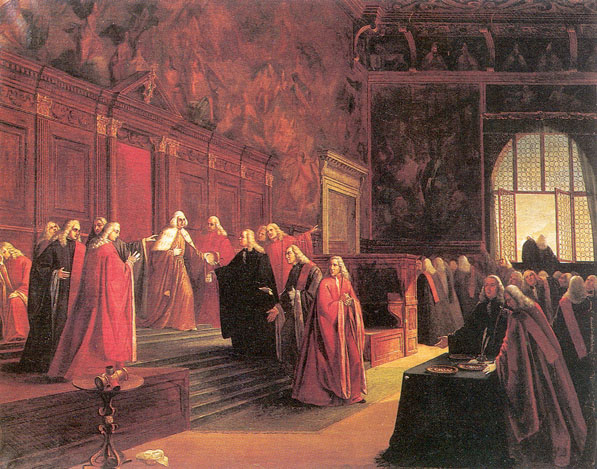
A portrait painting the fall of the Republic of Venice (1797): the abdication of the last Doge, Ludovico Manin

Via conquests, the Republic of Venice, from the 9th century until 1797, when it was conquered by Napoleon, extended its dominion to coastal parts of Istria and Dalmatia. Pula/Pola was an important centre of art and culture during the Italian Renaissance. The coastal areas and cities of Istria came under Venetian Influence in the 9th century. In 1145, the cities of Pula, Koper and Izola rose against the Republic of Venice but were defeated, and were since further controlled by Venice. On 15 February 1267, Poreč was formally incorporated with the Venetian state. Other coastal towns followed shortly thereafter. The Republic of Venice gradually dominated the whole coastal area of western Istria and the area to Plomin on the eastern part of the peninsula. Dalmatia was first and finally sold to the Republic of Venice in 1409 but Venetian Dalmatia wasn't fully consolidated from 1420.

From the Middle Ages onwards numbers of Slavic people near and on the Adriatic coast were ever increasing, due to their expanding population and due to pressure from the Ottomans pushing them from the south and east. This led to Italic people becoming ever more confined to urban areas, while the countryside was populated by Slavs, with certain isolated exceptions. In particular, the population was divided into urban-coastal communities (mainly Romance speakers) and rural communities (mainly Slavic speakers), with small minorities of Morlachs and Istro-Romanians. From the Middle Ages to the 19th century, Italian and Slavic communities in Istria and Dalmatia had lived peacefully side by side because they did not know the national identification, given that they generically defined themselves as "Istrians" and "Dalmatians", of "Romance" or "Slavic" culture.

After the fall of Napoleon (1814), Istria, Kvarner and Dalmatia were annexed to the Austrian Empire. Many Istrian Italians and Dalmatian Italians looked with sympathy towards the Risorgimento movement that fought for the unification of Italy. However, after the Third Italian War of Independence (1866), when the Veneto and Friuli regions were ceded by the Austrians to the newly formed Kingdom of Italy, Istria and Dalmatia remained part of the Austro-Hungarian Empire, together with other Italian-speaking areas on the eastern Adriatic. This triggered the gradual rise of Italian irredentism among many Italians in Istria, Kvarner and Dalmatia, who demanded the unification of the Julian March, Kvarner and Dalmatia with Italy.

Before 1859, Italian was the language of administration, education, the press, and the Austrian Navy; people who wished to acquire higher social standing and separate from the Slav peasantry became Italians. In the years after 1866, Italians lost their privileges in Austria-Hungary, their assimilation of the Slavs came to an end, and they found themselves under growing pressure by other rising nations; with the rising Slav tide after 1890, italianized Slavs reverted to being Croats.

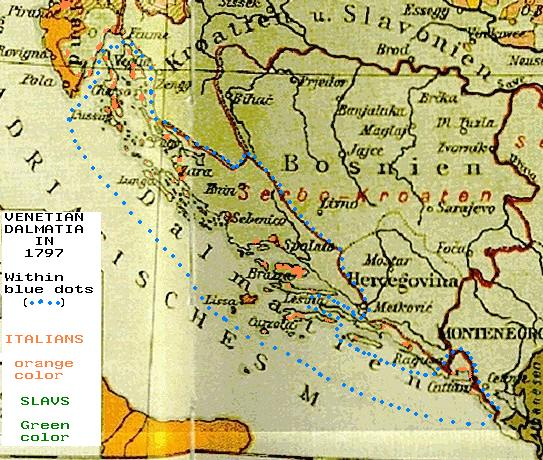
Austrian linguistic map from 1896. In green the areas where Slavs were the majority of the population, in orange the areas where Istrian Italians and Dalmatian Italians were the majority of the population. The boundaries of Venetian Dalmatia in 1797 are delimited with blue dots.

Austrian rulers found use of the racial antagonism and financed Slav schools and promoted Croatian as the official language, and many Italians chose voluntary exile. During the meeting of the Council of Ministers of 12 November 1866, Emperor Franz Joseph I of Austria outlined a wide-ranging project aimed at the Germanization or Slavization of the areas of the empire with an Italian presence:

His Majesty expressed the precise order that action be taken decisively against the influence of the Italian elements still present in some regions of the Crown and, appropriately occupying the posts of public, judicial, masters employees as well as with the influence of the press, work in South Tyrol, Dalmatia and Littoral for the Germanization and Slavization of these territories according to the circumstances, with energy and without any regard. His Majesty calls the central offices to the strong duty to proceed in this way to what has been established.

— Franz Joseph I of Austria, Council of the Crown of 12 November 1866

Istrian Italians made up about a third of the population in 1900. Dalmatia, especially its maritime cities, once had a substantial local ethnic Italian population (Dalmatian Italians). In Dalmatia there was a constant decline in the Italian population, in a context of repression that also took on violent connotations. During this period, Austrians carried out an aggressive anti-Italian policy through a forced Slavization of Dalmatia. According to Austrian census, the Dalmatian Italians formed 12.5% of the population in 1865. In the 1910 Austro-Hungarian census, Istria had a population of 57.8% Slavic-speakers (Croat and Slovene), and 38.1% Italian speakers. For the Austrian Kingdom of Dalmatia, (i.e. Dalmatia), the 1910 numbers were 96.2% Slavic speakers and 2.8% Italian speakers. In Rijeka the Italians were the relative majority in the municipality (48.61% in 1910), and in addition to the large Croatian community (25.95% in the same year), there was also a fair Hungarian minority (13.03%). According to the official Croatian census of 2011, there are 2,445 Italians in Rijeka (equal to 1.9% of the total population).

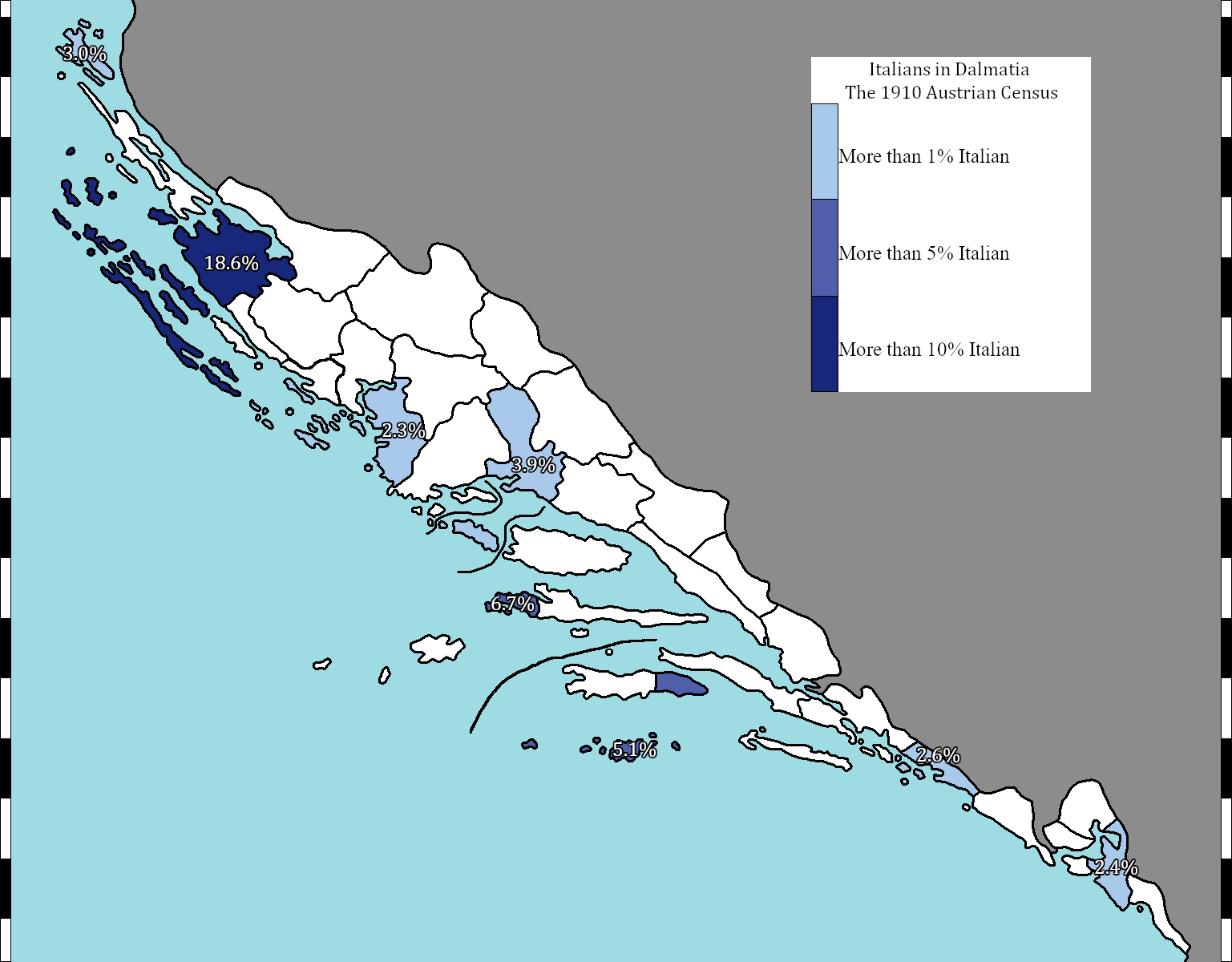
Proportion of Dalmatian Italians in districts of Dalmatia in 1910, per the Austro-Hungarian census

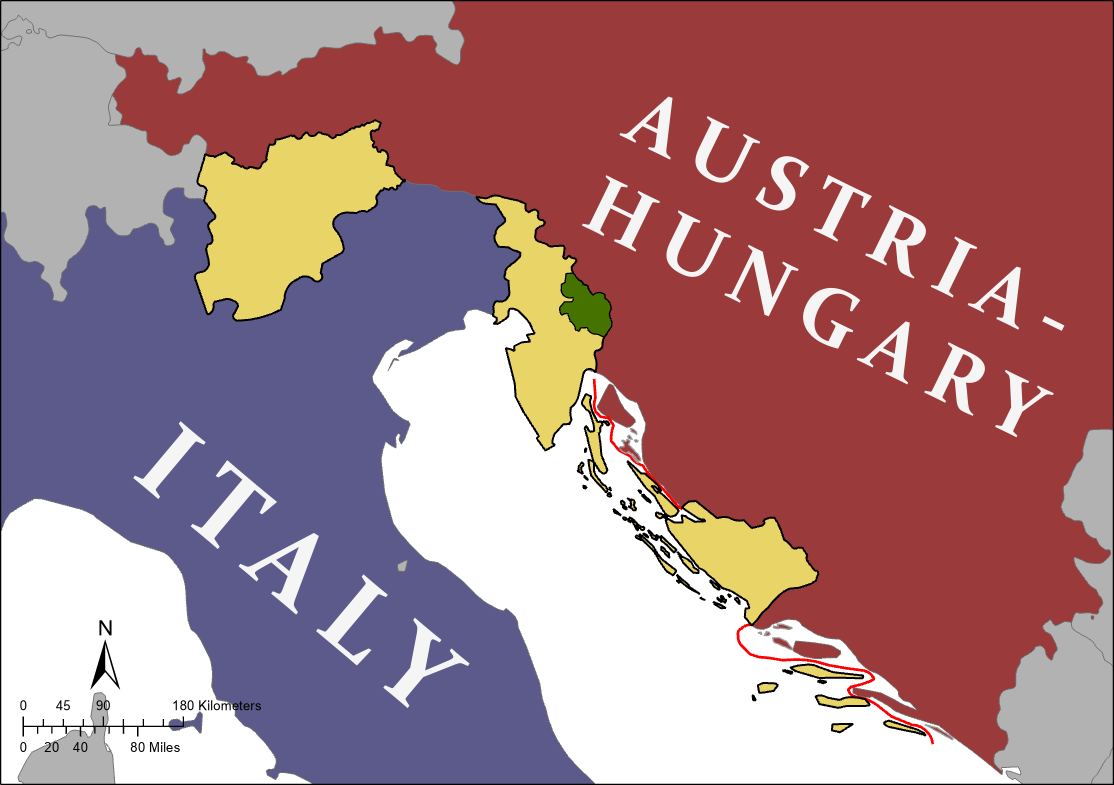
Territories promised to Italy by the London Pact (1915), i.e. Trentino-Alto Adige, the Julian March and Dalmatia (tan), and the Snežnik Plateau area (green). Dalmatia, after the WWI, however, was not assigned to Italy but to Yugoslavia

The Italian population in Dalmatia was concentrated in the major coastal cities. In the city of Split in 1890 there were 1,971 Dalmatian Italians (9% of the population), in Zadar 7,672 (27%), in Šibenik 1,090 (5%), in Kotor 646 (12%) and in Dubrovnik 356 (3%). In other Dalmatian localities, according to Austrian censuses, Italians experienced a sudden decrease: in the twenty years 1890-1910, in Rab they went from 225 to 151, in Vis from 352 to 92, in Pag from 787 to 23, completely disappearing in almost all inland locations.

While Slavic-speakers made up 80-95% of the Dalmatia populace, only Italian language schools existed until 1848, and due to restrictive voting laws, the Italian-speaking aristocratic minority retained political control of Dalmatia. Only after Austria liberalised elections in 1870, allowing more majority Slavs to vote, did Croatian parties gain control. Croatian finally became an official language in Dalmatia in 1883, along with Italian. Yet minority Italian-speakers continued to wield strong influence, since Austria favoured Italians for government work, thus in the Austrian capital of Dalmatia, Zara, the proportion of Italians continued to grow, making it the only Dalmatian city with an Italian majority. In 1909 the Italian language lost its status as the official language of Dalmatia and Italian could no longer be used in the public and administrative sphere.

In 1915, Italy declared war on the Austro-Hungarian Empire, leading to bloody conflict mainly on the Isonzo and Piave fronts. Britain, France and Russia had been "keen to bring neutral Italy into World War I on their side. However, Italy drove a hard bargain, demanding extensive territorial concessions once the war had been won". In a deal to bring Italy into the war, under the London Pact, Italy would be allowed to annex not only Italian-speaking Trentino and Trieste, but also German-speaking South Tyrol, Istria (which included large non-Italian communities), and the northern part of Dalmatia including the areas of Zadar (Zara) and Šibenik (Sebenico). Mainly Italian Fiume (present-day Rijeka) was excluded.

In November 1918, after the surrender of Austria-Hungary, Italy occupied militarily Trentino Alto-Adige, the Julian March, Istria, the Kvarner Gulf and Dalmatia, all Austro-Hungarian territories. On the Dalmatian coast, Italy established the Governorate of Dalmatia, which had the provisional aim of ferrying the territory towards full integration into the Kingdom of Italy, progressively importing national legislation in place of the previous one. The administrative capital was Zara. The Governorate of Dalmatia was evacuated following the Italo-Yugoslav agreements which resulted in the Treaty of Rapallo (1920). After the war, the Treaty of Rapallo between the Kingdom of Serbs, Croats and Slovenes (later the Kingdom of Yugoslavia) and the Kingdom of Italy (12 November 1920), Italy annexed Zadar in Dalmatia and some minor islands, almost all of Istria along with Trieste, excluding the island of Krk, and part of Kastav commune, which mostly went to the Kingdom of Serbs, Croats and Slovenes. By the Treaty of Rome (27 January 1924), the Free State of Fiume (Rijeka) was divided between Italy and Yugoslavia. Furthermore, after World War I and the fall of the Austro-Hungarian Empire, 10,000 Italians in the Governatorato took Yugoslav citizenship so they could remain and be accepted by the new Yugoslavian state.

In 1939 Italy conducted a covert census of the non-Italian population (Croats and Slovenes) in Istria, Kvarner, Zadar, Trieste and Gorizia. After the census, Italian authorities publicly stated that the Italian speaking population in those areas had increased. However, data proved that the share of Croatian speakers did not diminish in that period.

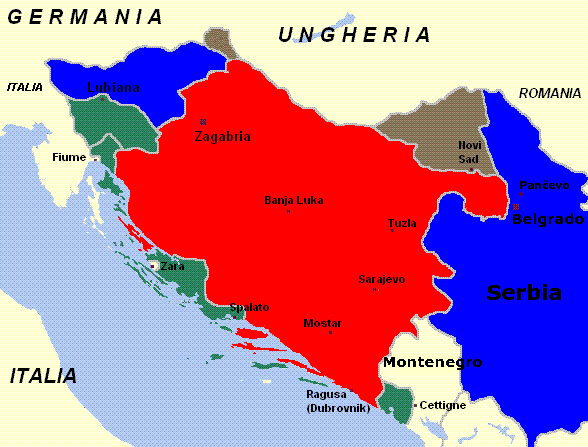
Division of Yugoslavia after its invasion by the Axis powers. Areas annexed by Italy: the area constituting the province of Ljubljana, the area merged with the province of Fiume and the areas making up the Governorate of Dalmatia Independent State of Croatia Area occupied by Nazi Germany Areas occupied by Kingdom of Hungary

Following the Wehrmacht invasion of Yugoslavia (6 April 1941) during World War II, the Italian zone of occupation was further expanded. Italy annexed large areas of Croatia (including most of coastal Dalmatia) and Slovenia (including its capital Ljubljana). During World War II the Kingdom of Italy annexed most of Dalmatia to the second Governatorato di Dalmazia. In 1942, 4020 Italians lived in these newly annexed areas: 2,220 in Spalato (Split), 300 in Sebenico (Šibenik), 500 in Cattaro (Kotor) and 1000 in Veglia (Krk).

For various reasons—mainly related to nationalism and armed conflict—the numbers of Italian speakers in Croatia declined during the 20th century, especially after the World War II in a period known as the Istrian–Dalmatian exodus, when about 90% Italian-speaking Istrian Italians and Dalmatian Italians were forced to leave or were given the right of option to leave Yugoslav dominated areas in the eastern Adriatic, corresponding to 230,000-350,000 people, between 1943 and the late 1950s. The Italians who remained in Yugoslavia, gathered in the Italian Union, were recognized as a national minority, with their own flag.

== Italian community in Croatia today ==
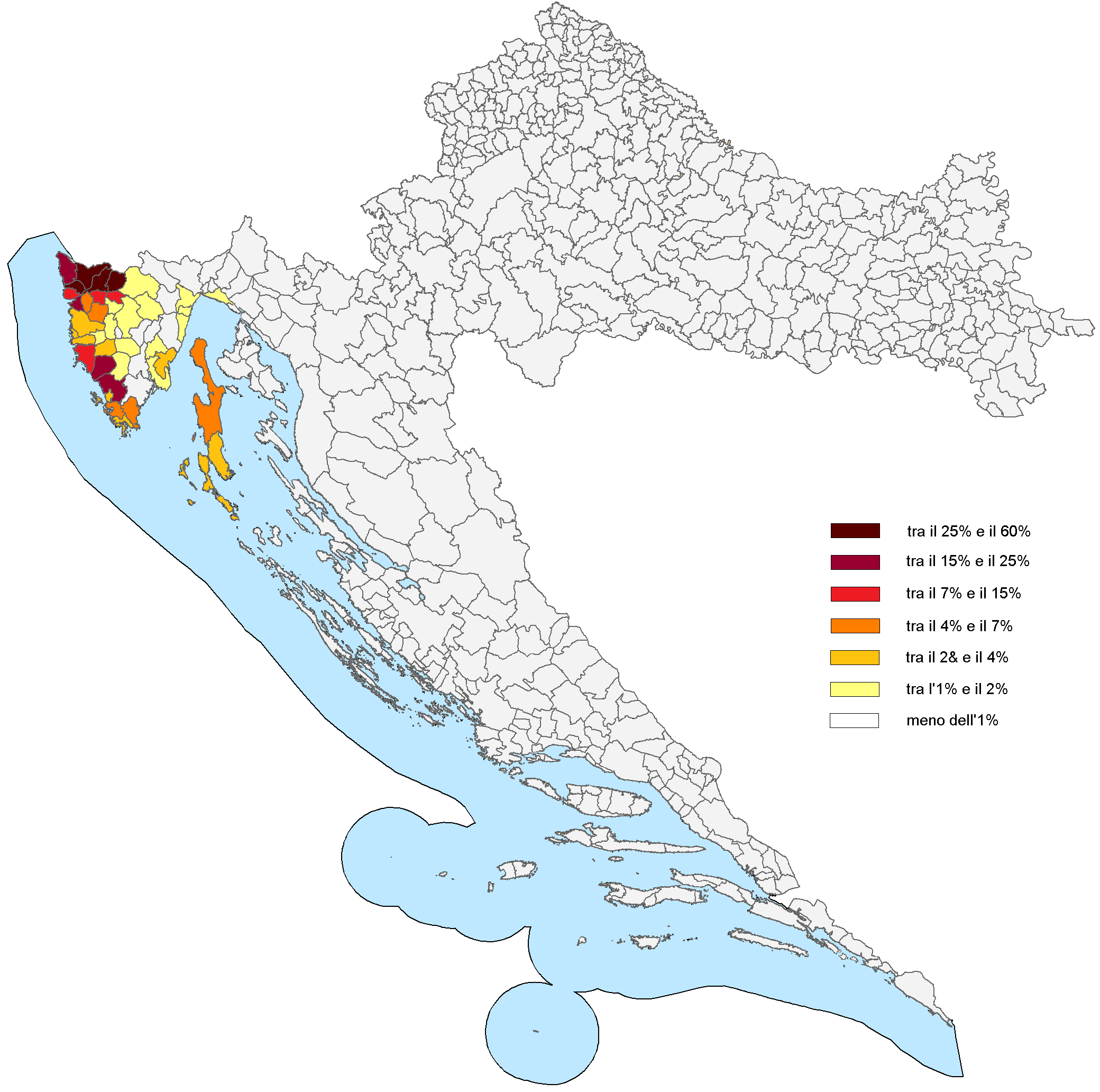
Italian-speaking percentage in Croatia divided by municipality, according to the Croatian census of 2011

The Italians in Croatia represent a residual minority of those indigenous Italian populations that inhabited for centuries and in large numbers, the coasts of Istria and the main cities of this and the coasts and islands of Dalmatia, which were territories of the Republic of Venice. After the conquest of Napoleon and his donation of the territories that belonged to the ancient Venetian Republic to the Habsburg Empire, these Italian populations had to undergo Austro-Hungarian power. After the First World War and the D'Annunzio enterprise of Fiume many of the Istrian and Dalmatian territories passed to the Kingdom of Italy, strengthening the Italian majority in Istria and Dalmatia. These populations were of Italian language and culture, speaking Venetian dialect and lived as a majority of the population in Istria and Dalmatia until the Second World War. After the Nazi-Fascist occupation of the Balkans, Slavic-speaking populations following the partisan commander Tito started a persecution of the Italian populations that had inhabited Istria and Dalmatia for several centuries. For fear of ethnic retaliation by the Slavic populations, the majority of Italians from Istria and Dalmatia poured into a real exodus towards Trieste and Triveneto. Subsequently, many of them were transferred by the authorities of the Italian Republic to southern Lazio and Sardinia where they formed numerous local communities. 34,345 Italians live in Croatia since the census conducted in Croatia on 29 June 2014, through self-certification (Italian Union data): according to official data at the 2001 census, 20,521 declared themselves to be native Italian speakers and 19,636 declared to be of Italian ethnicity). The Italian Croats create 51 local Italian National Communities and are organized in the Italian Union (UI).

According to Maurizio Tremul, president of the executive council of the UI, the census data in the part in which it is asked to declare the ethnicity are a bit distorted due to a "reverential fear" towards the censors who do not use Italian nor bilingual forms. The Croatian census in 2011 used a new methodology for the first time so that anyone who was not a resident of the territory or was not found at home was not surveyed.

The Italians are mainly settled in the area of Istria, the islands of Kvarner and Rijeka. In coastal Dalmatia there are only 500 left, almost all of them in Zadar and Split.

They are recognized by some municipal statutes as an indigenous population: in part of Istria (both in the Croatian Istrian region, in the four coastal municipalities of Slovenia), in parts of the region of Rijeka (Primorje-Gorski Kotar County) and in the Lošinj archipelago, while in the rest of Kvarner and in Dalmatia no particular status is granted to them.

In the city of Rijeka, where the largest Italian-language newspaper in Croatia is located, as well as some schools in Italian, officially there are about 2300 Italians, although the local Italian community in Rijeka has approximately 7500 members.

The indigenous Venetian populations (north-western Istria and Dalmatia) and the Istriot-speaking peoples of the south-western Istrian coast are included in this Italian ethnic group.

During the 19th century, a considerable number of Italian craftsmen moved to live in Zagreb and Slavonia (Požega), where many of their descendants still live. A local Community of Italians was formed in Zagreb, which mainly brings together among its members recent immigrants from Italy, as well as a fair number of Italian-speaking Istrians who have moved to the capital.

In Croatian Istria - between the towns of Valdarsa and Seiane - there is the small ethnic community of the Istroromeni or Cicci, a population originally from Romania whose language, of Latin and Romanian-like, is in danger of extinction in favor of the Croatian . During Fascism these Istrorumeni were considered ethnically Italian because of their mixing during the Middle Ages with the descendants of the Ladin populations of Roman Istria, and they were guaranteed elementary teaching in their native language.

According to the 2001 census, the municipalities of Croatia with the highest percentage of Italian-speaking inhabitants were all in Istria (mainly in the areas of the former zone B of the Free Territory of Trieste):

- Grisignana: 66.11%
- Verteneglio: 41.29%
- Buie: 39.66%
- Portole: 32.11%
- Valle d'Istria: 22.54%
- Umago: 20.70%
- Dignano: 20.03%

Grisignana (in Croatian "Grožnjan") is the only town with an absolute Italian-speaking majority in Croatia: over 2/3 of citizens still speak Italian and in the 2001 census over 53% declared themselves "native Italian", while Gallesano (in Croatian "Galižana") fraction of Dignano (in Croatian "Vodnjan") with 60% of the Italian population is the inhabited center of Istria with the highest percentage of Italians.

Towns and municipalities with over 5% of population of Italians:

Croatian name	Italian name	2001 Census	pct of pop.	2011 Census	pct of pop.
Buje	Buie	1,587	29.72	1,261	24.33
Novigrad	Cittanova	511	12.77	443	10.20
Rovinj	Rovigno	1,628	11.44	1,608	11.25
Umag	Umago	2,365	18.33	1,962	14.57
Vodnjan	Dignano	1,133	20.05	1,017	16.62
Bale	Valle	290	27.70	260	23.07
Brtonigla	Verteniglio	590	37.37	490	30.14
Fažana	Fasana	154	5.05	173	4.76
Grožnjan	Grisignana	402	51.21	290	39.40
Kaštelir-Labinci	Castelliere-S. Domenica	98	7.35	70	4.78
Ližnjan	Lisignano	179	6.08	168	4.24
Motovun	Montona	97	9.87	98	9.76
Oprtalj	Portole	184	18.76	122	14.35
Višnjan	Visignano	199	9.10	155	6.82
Vižinada	Visinada	116	10.20	88	7.60
Tar-Vabriga	Torre-Abrega	Part of Poreč until 2006		195	9.80

Italians in Croatia are represented by one member of parliament since 1992, by elections in special electoral unit for minorities.

Incumbent Furio Radin is the only representative of Italians since introductions of the Electoral law in 1992. Before 2020 elections he announced he will run for the one last time.

No.	Representative	Party	Elections won	Term
1	Furio Radin	Independent	1992; 1995; 2000; 2003; 2007; 2011; 2015; 2016; 2020; 2024	1992 − (2028)

== Croatisation ==
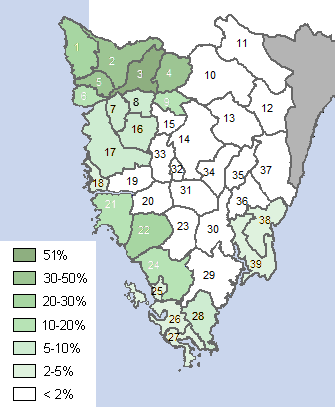
Istrian region of Croatia: distribution of native Italian speakers by municipality in the 2001 census.

The Italian-Croatians have experienced a process of croatisation over the past two centuries. In 2001 about 500 Dalmatian Italians were counted in Dalmatia. In particular, according to the official Croatian census of 2011, there are 83 Dalmatian Italians in Split (equal to 0.05% of the total population), 16 in Šibenik (0.03%) and 27 in Dubrovnik (0.06%). According to the official Croatian census of 2021, there are 63 Dalmatian Italians in Zadar (equal to 0.09% of the total population).

After World War I the Kingdom of Yugoslavia attempted a policy of forced Croatisation against the Italian minority in Dalmatia. The majority of the Italian Dalmatian minority decided to transfer in the Kingdom of Italy. The Italian-Croatians practically disappeared from the islands of central and southern Dalmatia during the rule of Titus, while at the time of the Risorgimento the Italians were still numerous in Lissa and other Dalmatian islands.

The last blow to the Italian presence in Dalmatia and in some areas of Kvarner and Istria took place in October 1953, when the Italian schools in Communist Yugoslavia were closed and the pupils moved imperiously to the Croatian schools.

In Lagosta (in Croatian Lastovo), which belonged to the Kingdom of Italy from 1918 to 1947, there are still some Italian-Croatian families not fully Croatianized today.

=== Lagosta and Pelagosa (Lastovo and Palagruža) ===
The island of Lagosta belonged to Italy from 1920 until the end of the Second World War. While up to 1910 the presence of Italian speakers on the island was minuscule (8 in the territory of the municipality out of a total of 1,417 inhabitants), in the 1920s and 1930s several families of Italian Dalmatians moved from the areas of Dalmatia passed to the Yugoslavia. In the 1930s, about half of the inhabitants were Italian-speaking, but emigrated almost entirely after the end of the Second World War.

Some Venetian or Italian-speaking families are still present on the island of Lesina, where the creation of an Italian Union headquarters - named after the Lesignano writer Giovanni Francesco Biondi - for all Italian-Croatians of Dalmatia has been promoted Southern.

Pelagosa (and its small archipelago) was populated together with the nearby Tremiti islands by Ferdinando II of the Kingdom of the Two Sicilies in 1843 with fishermen from Ischia, who continued to speak the dialect of origin there. The attempt failed and the few fishermen emigrated in the late nineteenth century. During Fascism, the Italian authorities transplanted some fishermen from Tremiti, who left the island when it officially passed to Yugoslavia in 1947. The Pelagosa archipelago is uninhabited.

== Flag ==
Flag of Italians of Croatia Narodna zastava Talijana u Hrvatskoj Bandiera degli italiani di Croazia
- Proportion: 1:2
- Design: A vertical tricolor of green, white and red

Flag of SFR Yugoslav Italian Minority

The Italians of Croatia have an ethnic flag. It is a flag of Italy with a 1:2 aspect ratio. The flag was introduced on the basis of decisions of Unione Italiana which acts on the territory of Slovenia and Croatia as the highest body of minority self-government of the Italian minority in Croatia and Slovenia.

== Education and Italian language ==
In many municipalities in the Istrian region (Croatia) there are bilingual statutes, and the Italian language is considered to be a co-official language. The proposal to raise Italian to a co-official language, as in the Istrian Region, has been under discussion for years.

By recognizing and respecting its cultural and historical legacy, the City of Rijeka ensures the use of its language and writing to the Italian indigenous national minority in public affairs relating to the sphere of self-government of the City of Rijeka. The City of Fiume, within the scope of its possibilities, ensures and supports the educational and cultural activity of the members of the indigenous Italian minority and its institutions.

Beside Croat language schools, in Istria there are also kindergartens in Buje/Buie, Brtonigla/Verteneglio, Novigrad/Cittanova, Umag/Umago, Poreč/Parenzo, Vrsar/Orsera, Rovinj/Rovigno, Bale/Valle, Vodnjan/Dignano, Pula/Pola and Labin/Albona, as well as primary schools in Buje/Buie, Brtonigla/Verteneglio, Novigrad/Cittanova, Umag/Umago, Poreč/Parenzo, Vodnjan/Dignano, Rovinj/Rovigno, Bale/Valle and Pula/Pola, as well as lower secondary schools and upper secondary schools in Buje/Buie, Rovinj/Rovigno and Pula/Pola, all with Italian as the language of instruction.

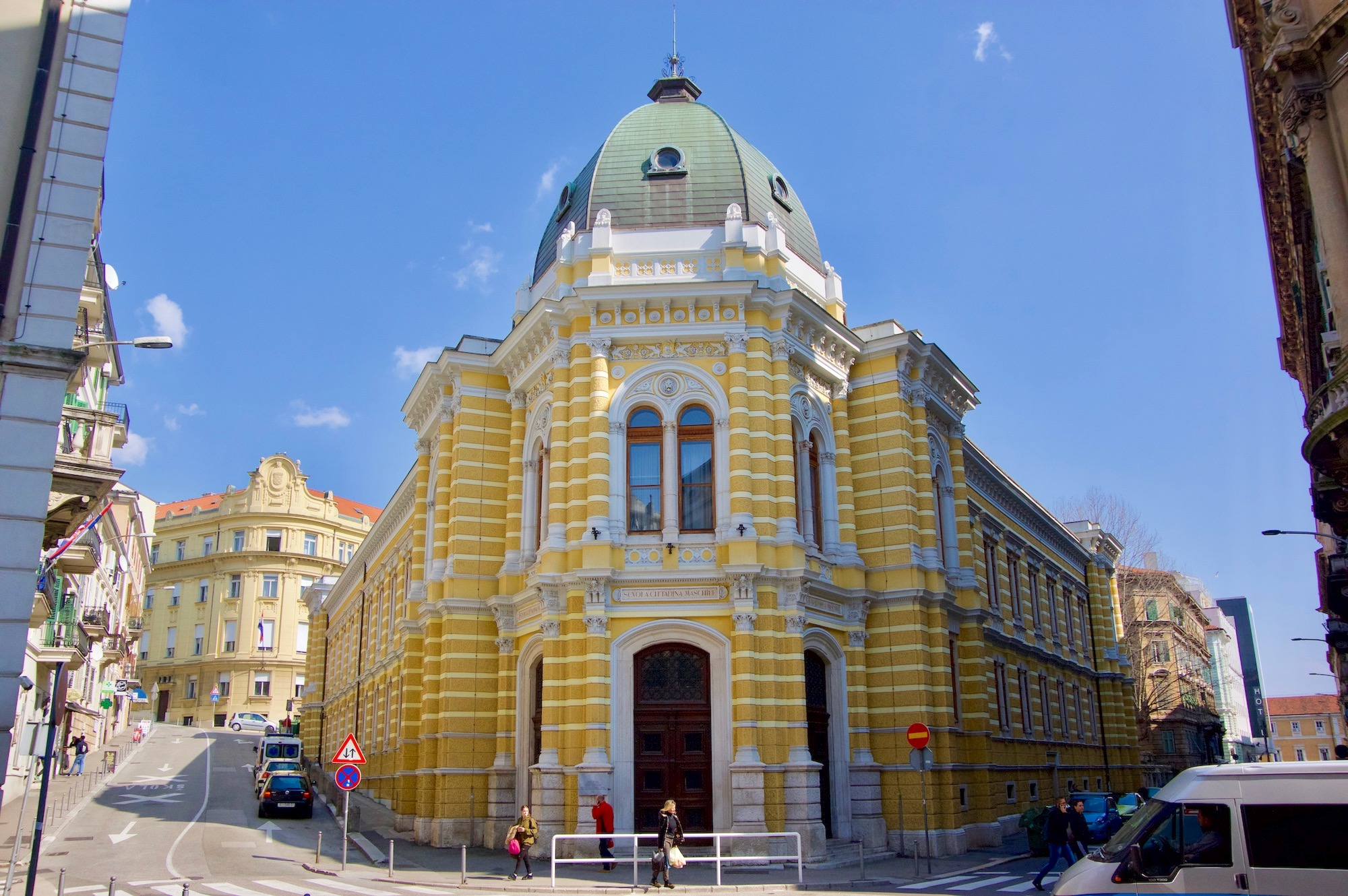
Italian Secondary School in Rijeka/Fiume

The city of Rijeka/Fiume in the Kvarner/Carnaro region has Italian kindergartens and elementary schools, and there is an Italian Secondary School in Rijeka. The town of Mali Lošinj/Lussinpiccolo in the Kvarner/Carnaro region has an Italian kindergarten.

In Zadar, in Dalmatia/Dalmazia region, the local Community of Italians has requested the creation of an Italian-language kindergarten since 2009. After considerable government opposition, with the imposition of a national filter that imposed the obligation to possess Italian citizenship for registration, in the end in 2013 it was opened hosting the first 25 children. This kindergarten is the first Italian educational institution opened in Dalmatia after the closure of the last Italian school, which operated there until 1953.

Since 2017, a Croatian primary school has been offering the study of the Italian language as a foreign language. Italian courses have also been activated in a secondary school and at the faculty of literature and philosophy. An estimated 14% of Croats speak Italian as a second language, which is one of the highest percentages in the European Union.

== See also ==
- Croatia–Italy relations
- Croatisation
- Croats of Italy
- Dalmatian Italians
- Istrian Italians
- Istrian–Dalmatian exodus

== Literature ==
- Monzali, Luciano (2016). "A Difficult and Silent Return: Italian Exiles from Dalmatia and Yugoslav Zadar/Zara after the Second World War". Balcanica (47): 317–328. doi:10.2298/BALC1647317M. hdl:11586/186368.
- Ezio e Luciano Giuricin (2015) Mezzo secolo di collaborazione (1964-2014) Lineamenti per la storia delle relazioni tra la Comunità italiana in Istria, Fiume e Dalmazia e la Nazione madre
- Ivetic, Egidio (2022). Povijest Jadrana: More i njegove civilizacije [History of the Adriatic: A Sea and Its Civilization] (in Croatian and English). Srednja Europa, Polity Press. ISBN 9789538281747.
