= Kaštelir =

Kaštelir Castellier
- Village
- Location within Croatia
- Coordinates: 45°18′11″N 13°41′06″E
- Country: Croatia
- County: Istria County
- Municipality: Kaštelir-Labinci

Area
  - Total: 0.39 sq mi (1.0 km^{2})

Population (2021)
  - Total: 305
  - Density: 790/sq mi (310/km^{2})
- Time zone: UTC+1 (CET)
  - Summer (DST): UTC+2 (CEST)
- Postal code: 52464 Kaštelir
- Area code: 052

Kaštelir (Italian: Castelliere) is a village in Kaštelir-Labinci municipality in Istria County, Croatia.

== Demographics ==
According to the 2021 census, its population was 305. It was 329 in 2011.
