= Italian Secondary School, Rijeka =

Italian Secondary School in Rijeka
- Srednja talijanska škola Rijeka; Scuola media superiore italiana Fiume
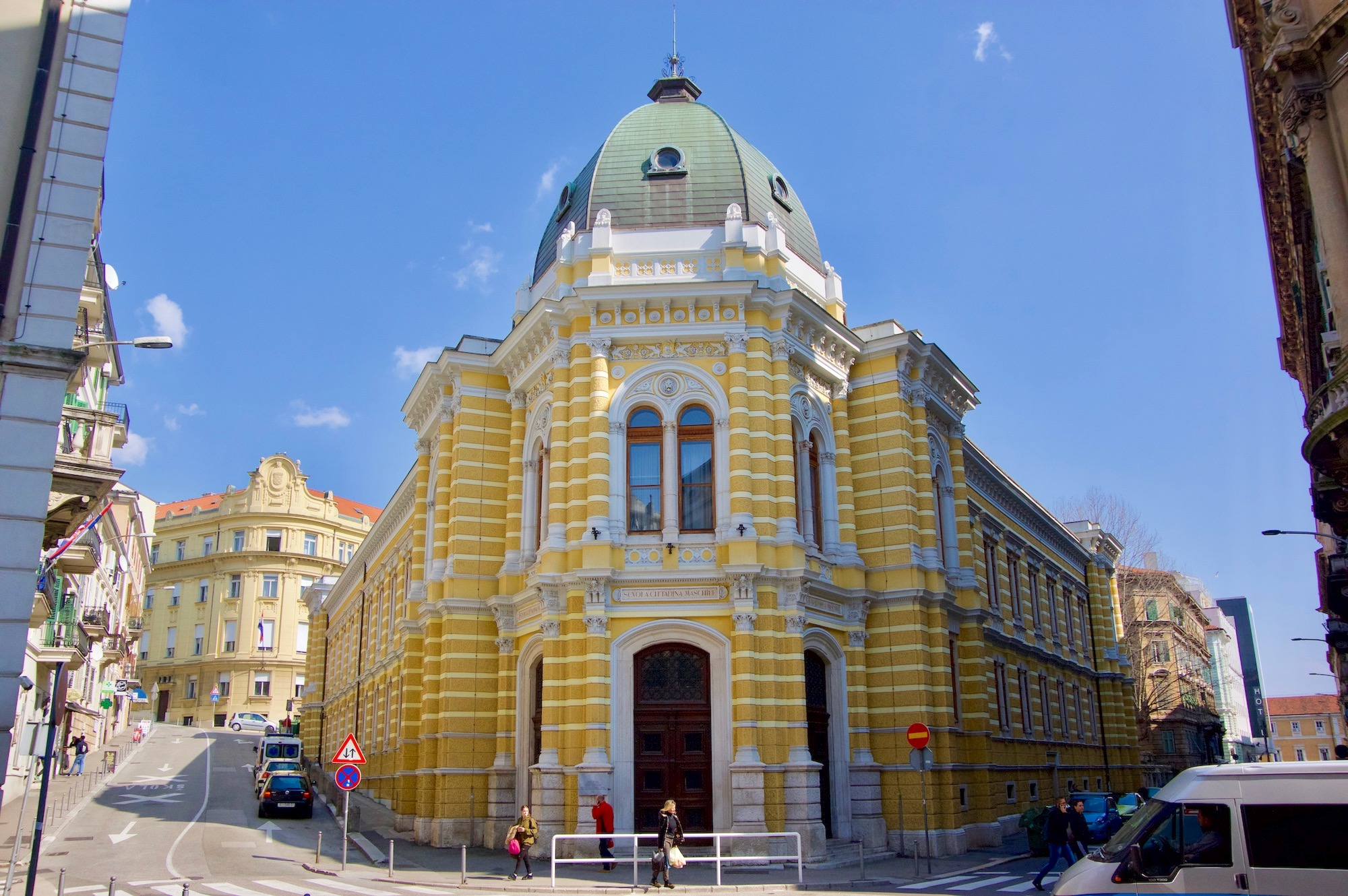
- School building

Location
- Erazma Barčića 6 Rijeka; Croatia
- Coordinates: 45°19′43.3″N 14°26′22.0″E

Information
- Type: Secondary school
- Established: 1888
- Principal: Michele Scalembra
- Website: sts-rijeka-smsi-fiume.hr//

Italian Secondary School in Rijeka (Croatian: Srednja talijanska škola Rijeka; Italian: Scuola media superiore italiana di Fiume) is a public high school for the Italian ethnic minority in the city of Rijeka, Croatia. The school was established in 1888 and has been in operation continuously since then. The school building is protected as a cultural heritage site. It was renovated from 2006 to 2008 with the support of City of Rijeka and Primorje-Gorski Kotar County.

Students of the school were among the founders of the Olimpia sport club, that has over the years, become the most successful sport organization in Rijeka.

== See also ==
- Italians of Croatia
- Kantakuzina Katarina Branković Serbian Orthodox Secondary School
- Education in Croatia
