= Babići (Umag) =

Babići Babici
- Village
- Location within Croatia
- Coordinates: 45°23′28″N 13°33′29″E
- Country: Croatia
- County: Istria County
- Municipality: Umag

Area
  - Total: 3.7 sq mi (9.5 km^{2})

Population (2021)
  - Total: 473
  - Density: 130/sq mi (50/km^{2})
- Time zone: UTC+1 (CET)
  - Summer (DST): UTC+2 (CEST)
- Postal code: 52470 Umag
- Area code: 052

Babići (Italian: Babici) is a village in Umag municipality in Istria County, Croatia.

== Demographics ==
According to the 2021 census, its population was 473. It was 456 in 2001.
