= Babići, Kaštelir-Labinci =

Babići Babici
- Village
- Location within Croatia
- Coordinates: 45°18′29″N 13°41′31″E
- Country: Croatia
- County: Istria County
- Municipality: Kaštelir-Labinci

Area
  - Total: 0.077 sq mi (0.2 km^{2})

Population (2021)
  - Total: 76
  - Density: 980/sq mi (380/km^{2})
- Time zone: UTC+1 (CET)
  - Summer (DST): UTC+2 (CEST)
- Postal code: 52464 Kaštelir
- Area code: 052

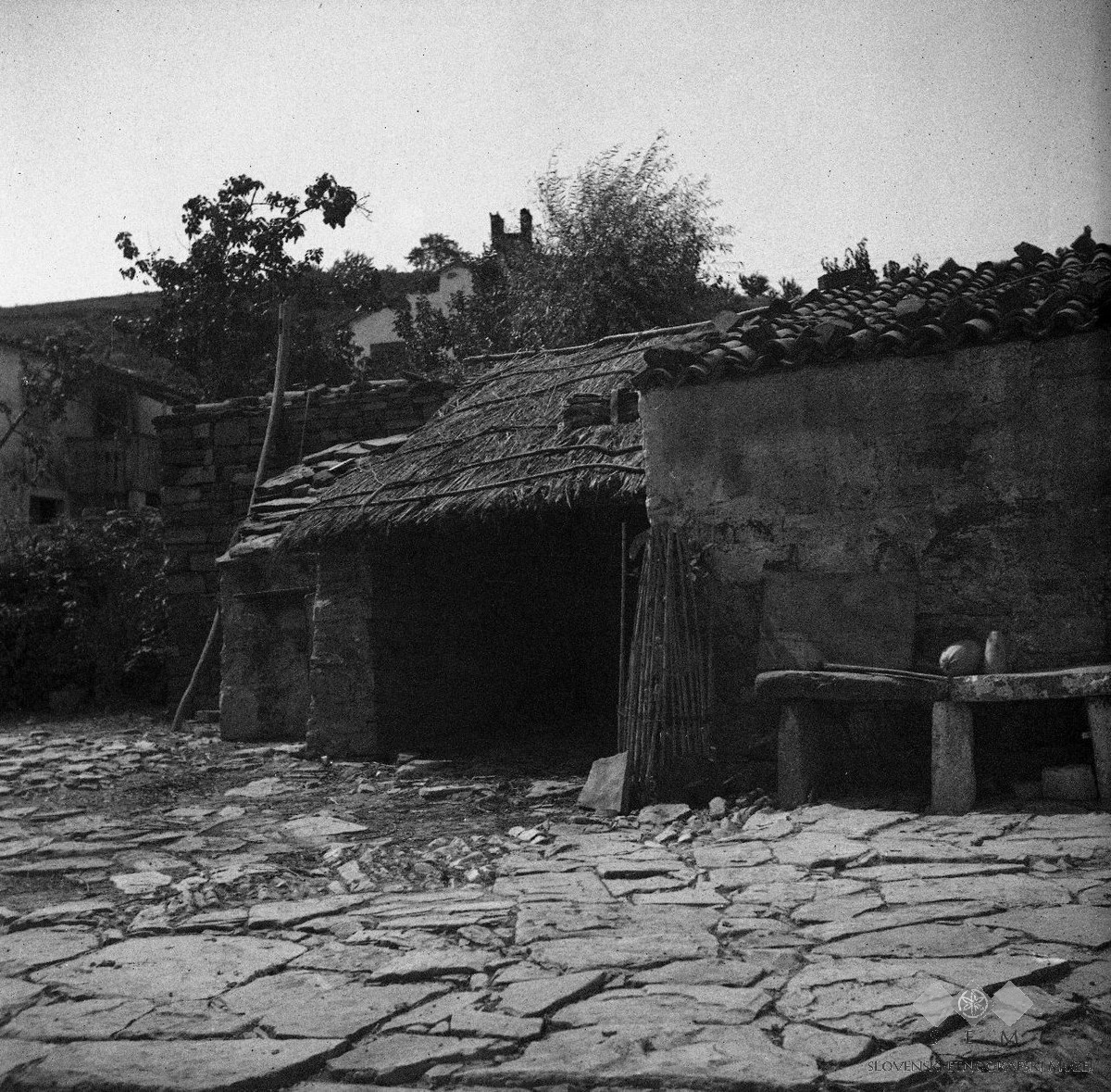
A straw-covered "roof" for a cart and storage, Babiči, 1950

Babići (Italian: Babici) is a village in Kaštelir-Labinci municipality in Istria County, Croatia.

== Demographics ==
According to the 2021 census, its population was 76. It was 75 in 2011.
