= Rogovići, Kaštelir-Labinci =

Rogovići Stanzia Grande, Rigovich, Rogovici
- Village
- Location within Croatia
- Coordinates: 45°18′43″N 13°39′07″E
- Country: Croatia
- County: Istria County
- Municipality: Kaštelir-Labinci

Area
  - Total: 1.1 sq mi (2.9 km^{2})

Population (2021)
  - Total: 101
  - Density: 90/sq mi (35/km^{2})
- Time zone: UTC+1 (CET)
  - Summer (DST): UTC+2 (CEST)
- Postal code: 52465 Tar
- Area code: 052

Rogovići (Italian: Stanzia Grande or Rogovich or Rogovici) is a village in Kaštelir-Labinci municipality in Istria County, Croatia.

== Demographics ==
According to the 2021 census, its population was 101. It was also 101 in 2011.
