= Kaštelir-Labinci =

- Municipality
- Kaštelir-Labinci Municipality; Općina Kaštelir-Labinci - Comune di Castellier-Santa Domenica
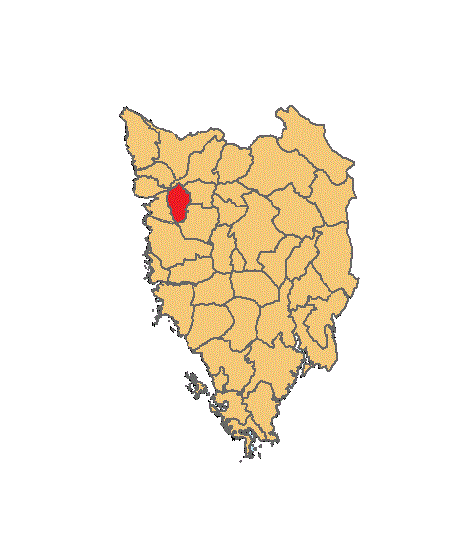
- Location of Kaštelir-Labinci municipality in Istria
- Interactive map of Kaštelir-Labinci
- Location within Croatia
- Coordinates: 45°20′N 13°38′E
- Country: Croatia
- County: Istria County

Government
  - Mayor: Enio Jugovac

Area
  - Total: 35.2 km^{2} (13.6 sq mi)

Population (2021)
  - Total: 1,493
  - Density: 42.4/km^{2} (110/sq mi)
- Time zone: UTC+1 (CET)
  - Summer (DST): UTC+2 (CEST)
- Postal code: 52440 Poreč
- Area code: 052
- Website: kastelir-labinci.hr

Kaštelir-Labinci ( Italian: Castellier-Santa Domenica) is a municipality in Istria, Croatia. Kaštelir and Labinci have been gradually urbanized over the centuries, and have gradually merged into one place. According to historical data, Labinci used to be a bigger place than Kaštela, but today Kašteliri is a bigger place, which is also evident from the name of the place. Throughout history, these two places were under the jurisdiction of Motovun and later Vižinada.

== Demographics ==
In 2021, the municipality had 1,493 residents in the following 15 settlements:

- Babići, population 76
- Brnobići, population 156
- Cerjani, population 22
- Deklići, population 34
- Dvori, population 62
- Kaštelir, population 305
- Kovači, population 65
- Krančići, population 81
- Labinci, population 315
- Mekiši kod Kaštelira, population 9
- Rogovići, population 101
- Rojci, population 72
- Roškići, population 52
- Tadini, population 68
- Valentići, population 75
Kaštelir-Labinci: Population trends 1857–2021
v

| population | 935 | 1031 | 1197 | 1435 | 1741 | 2075 | 1948 | 2119 | 2045 | 1805 | 1572 | 1218 | 1168 | 1296 | 1334 | 1463 | 1493 |
| | 1857 | 1869 | 1880 | 1890 | 1900 | 1910 | 1921 | 1931 | 1948 | 1953 | 1961 | 1971 | 1981 | 1991 | 2001 | 2011 | 2021 |

Sources: Croatian Bureau of Statistics publications

=== Languages ===
Although though the Government of the Republic of Croatia does not guarantee official Croatian-Italian bilinguialism, the statute of Kaštelir-Labinci/Castellier-Santa Domenica itself does.
