= European route E751 =

Road in trans-European E-road network

E751

- E751 constituents: A8 (Croatia) A9 (Croatia); G11 (Slovenia)

Route information
- Length: 160 km (99 mi)

Major junctions
- East end: A7 in Rijeka
- A9 in Kanfanar D66 in Pula
- West end: H5 in Koper

Location
- Countries: Croatia, Slovenia

Highway system
- International E-road network; A Class; B Class
← E717	→ E761

The European route E751, or E751, as defined by the Declaration on the Construction of Main International Traffic Arteries of 1975, and subsequent documents which amended the treaty, is an east–west Class-B branching European road route. Originating in Rijeka, Croatia, where it diverges from European route E61 before passing through the Kanfanar interchange, the route connects Pula, Rovinj, Poreč and Umag in Croatia with Koper in Slovenia. The route provides a high-performance road link in Istria and Slovenian Littoral. Unlike most routes, the E751 centers on the Kanfanar interchange and has three arms, each extending to Rijeka, Pula and Koper. The total length of the route, including all the route arms, is 160 km (99 mi).

The E751 mostly consists of motorways, but considerable sections are either expressways or two-lane roads with at-grade intersections. All motorway sections of the E751 are tolled, using the electronic toll collection (ETC) and ticket systems. Since the 1980s, the E751 has gradually been upgraded from a regular two-lane road to motorway standards, and further upgrades are still being carried out or planned in some areas, particularly in the Rijeka–Kanfanar section and in the section located in Slovenia. The bulk of the E751 consists of the Istrian Y roads operated by BINA Istra. The part of the route in Slovenia is managed by the Slovenian Roads Agency, part of the Government of Slovenia.

The E751 is considered to be of great importance for the economy and tourist industry of the region, as it links many resorts to motorway systems in Slovenia and Croatia, providing a significant access route for thousands of motoring tourists. Furthermore, two endpoints of the E751 are located in the vicinity of the two major Adriatic seaports of Rijeka and Koper.

== Route description ==
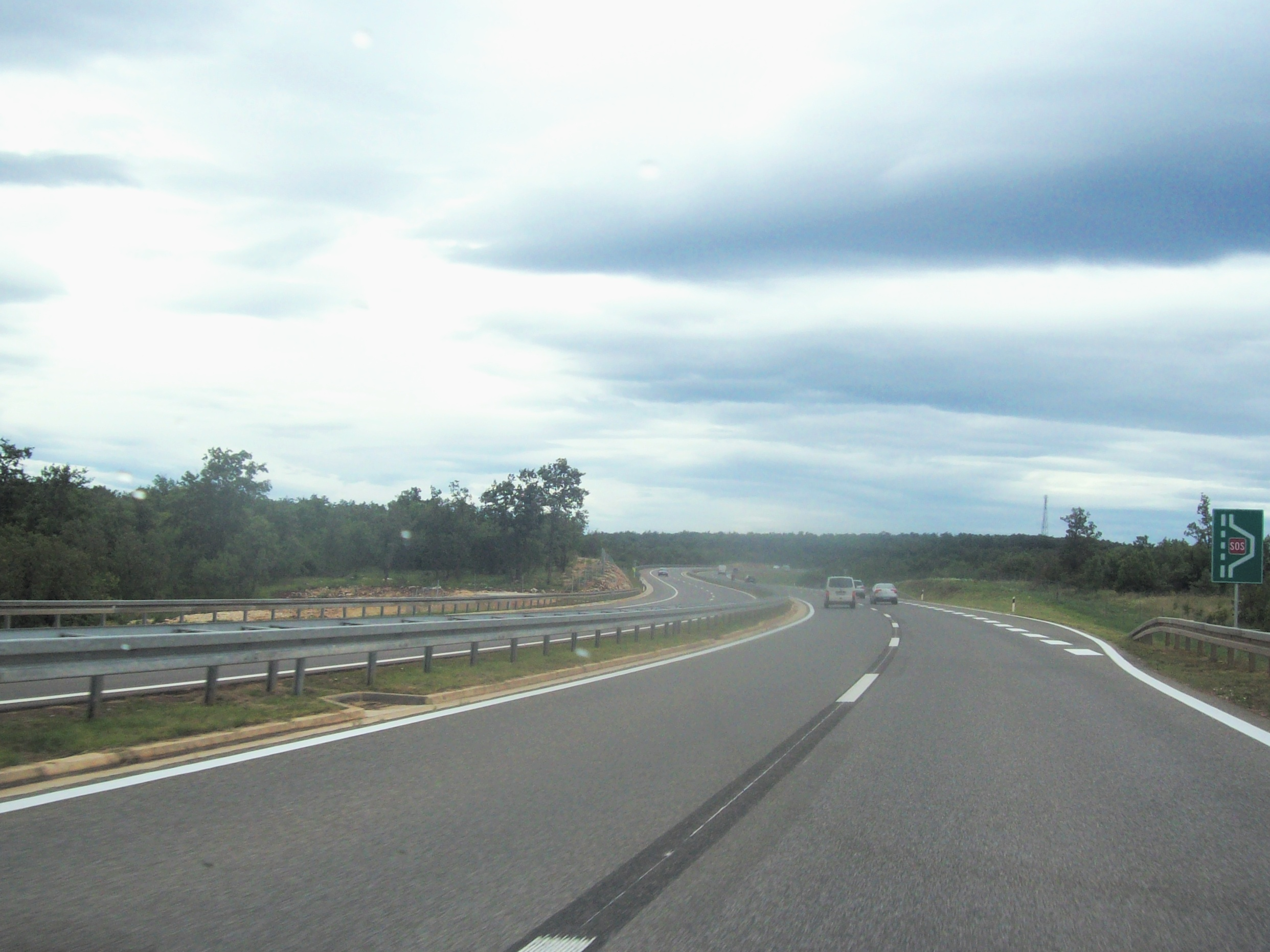
The E751 as Croatian A9 motorway

The 160-kilometre (99 mi) long E751, part of the International E-road network, connects Croatian and Slovenian Adriatic coastal areas in the vicinity of the city of Rijeka, Istria and Slovenian Littoral. This European route is a Class B branch road, consisting mostly of motorways and expressways along with two-lane roads that have at-grade intersections. It diverges from European route E61 at the Matulji interchange of the Croatian A7 and the A8 motorways, and follows the A8 motorway route. Since sections of the A8 east of Rogovići interchange are still incomplete and lack the second carriageway, those comprise two-lane, limited access roads with grade-separated interchanges (except the Opatija junction) with the D8 state road and is at-grade and regulated by traffic lights. As the A8 terminates at the Kanfanar interchange, the E751 switches to the six-lane A9 motorway. At this junction, the E751 is signposted in both directions, following an approximately 30 kilometres (19 miles) long arm of the Istrian Y system, consisting of the A9 and the A8 roads, to Pula and a considerably longer northward arm to Umag. The A8 and the A9 are the longest segments of the E751, being 141 kilometres (88 miles) long combined. Following the northern terminus of the A9 motorway in the Umag interchange, the E751 switches to the 0.6-kilometre (0.37 mi) D510 connector and the northernmost section of the D21 state road running to the Kaštel/Dragonja border crossing to Slovenia. Beyond the border, the E751 follows the G11 road to the city of Koper, where the E751 terminates. Thus, unlike most routes, the E751 centers on a central interchange, Kanfanar, and has three arms, each extending to Rijeka, Pula and Koper.

The E751 route is of great importance for economy and tourist industry of Istria and Slovenian Littoral, as it links many resorts to motorway systems in Slovenia and Croatia, providing a significant access route for thousands of motoring tourists. These resorts include Brijuni National Park, Fažana, Rovinj, Poreč, Novigrad, Umag, Piran and Portorož on either side of the Croatian–Slovenian border. Furthermore, two endpoints of the E751 are located in vicinity of two major Adriatic seaports: the Port of Rijeka and the Port of Koper.

== Tolls ==
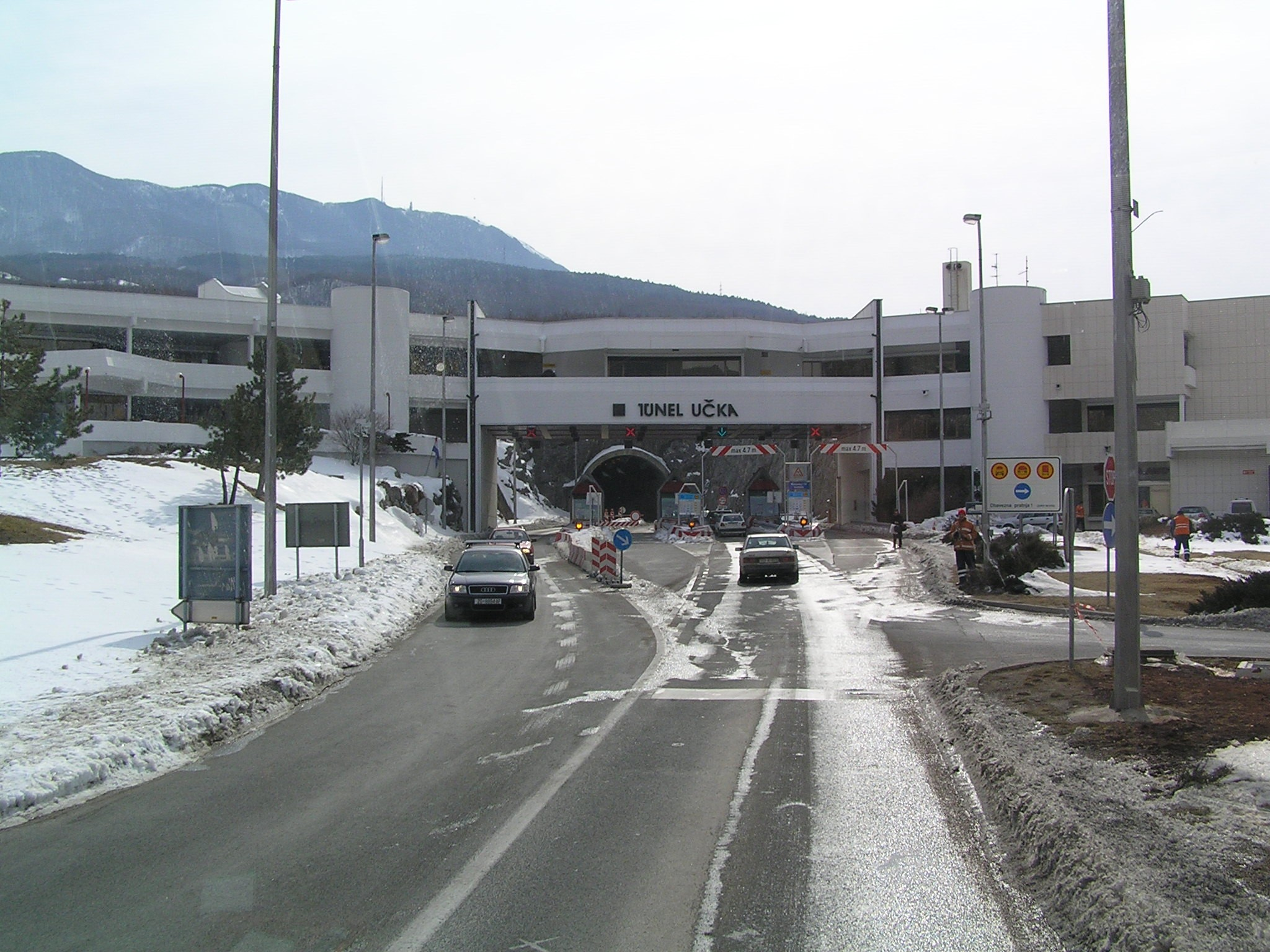
A8 Učka Tunnel western toll plaza

Since June 2011, the E751 comprises the Croatian A8 and A9 tolled motorways of the Istrian Y. The tolls there are based on the vehicle classification in Croatia using a closed-toll system. Tolls charged along the A9 motorway toll plazas vary depending on the length of route traveled and range from 3.00 kuna (€0.40) to 26.00 kuna (€3.51) for passenger cars and 15.00 kuna (€2.02) to 185.00 kuna (€25.00) for semi-trailer trucks. Although A8 also employs a ticket system, usage of the road is free except for vehicles traversing the Učka Tunnel and the Kanfanar–Rogovići section. A user of the entire length of the A8 is charged 36.00 kuna (€4.86) for passenger cars or up to 205.00 kuna (€27.70) for semi-trailers, depending on vehicle classification in Croatia. Ticket systems employed by the A9 and the A8 are unified; tolls are not charged when switching between the two roads. The toll is payable in either Croatian kuna or euros using major credit cards, debit cards and a number of prepaid toll collection systems. The latter includes various types of smart cards issued by the motorway operator and ENC, an electronic toll collection (ETC) system which is used by most motorways in Croatia and provides drivers with discounted toll rates for dedicated lanes at toll plazas.

The operator of the A9 and the A8 routes, BINA Istra, reported a 65.8 million kuna (€8.9 million) VAT-free toll income in the first half of 2011; this represents an increase of 30.8 percent compared to the same period of the previous year. The figure includes the entire Istrian Y system: the A9 motorway and the A8 motorway. A major part of the increase is attributed to introduction of the closed-toll system, which replaced an open toll system where the toll was charged at the Mirna Bridge and the Učka Tunnel only. The part of the E751 in Slovenia, maintained by the Slovenian Roads Agency of the Government of Slovenia, is not tolled, nor is a short part of the E751 consisting of less than 2 kilometres (1.2 miles) Croatian state roads. The state roads in Croatia are maintained by Hrvatske ceste.

== History ==
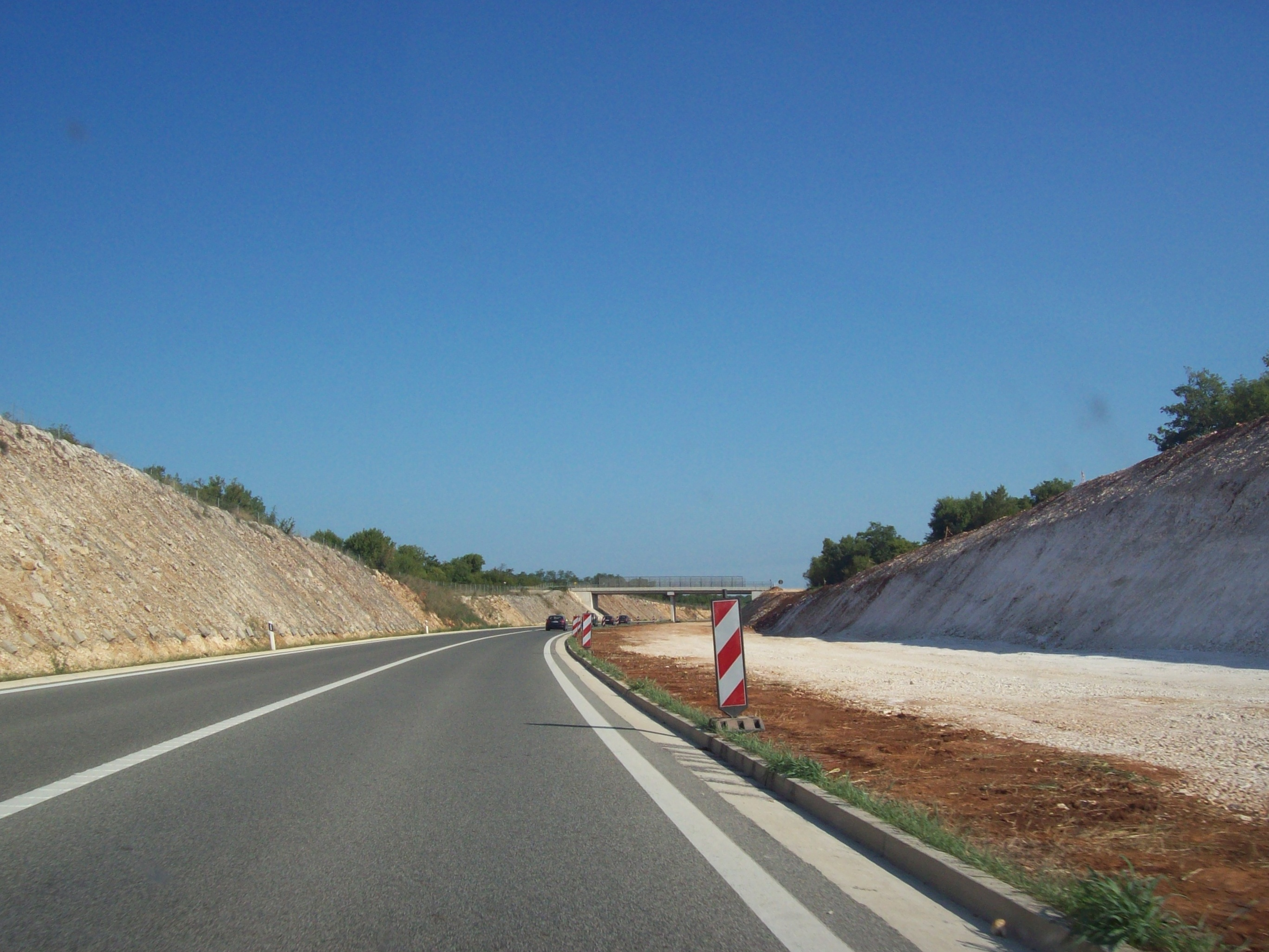
The A9 during its upgrade to six lanes, 2009

The United Nations Economic Commission for Europe was formed in 1947, and their first major act to improve transportation was the joint UN declaration numbered 1264. Signed in Geneva on 16 September 1950, it was named the Declaration on the Construction of Main International Traffic Arteries, which defined the first E-road network. This declaration was amended several times before 15 November 1975, when it was replaced by the European Agreement on Main International Traffic Arteries (AGR), which established a route-numbering system and improved standards for roads on the list. The AGR went through several changes, the last one of which, as of 2011, occurred 2008. Reorganization of the E-roads network of 1975 and 1983 defined the E751 road and assigned it to Rijeka–Pula–Koper route.

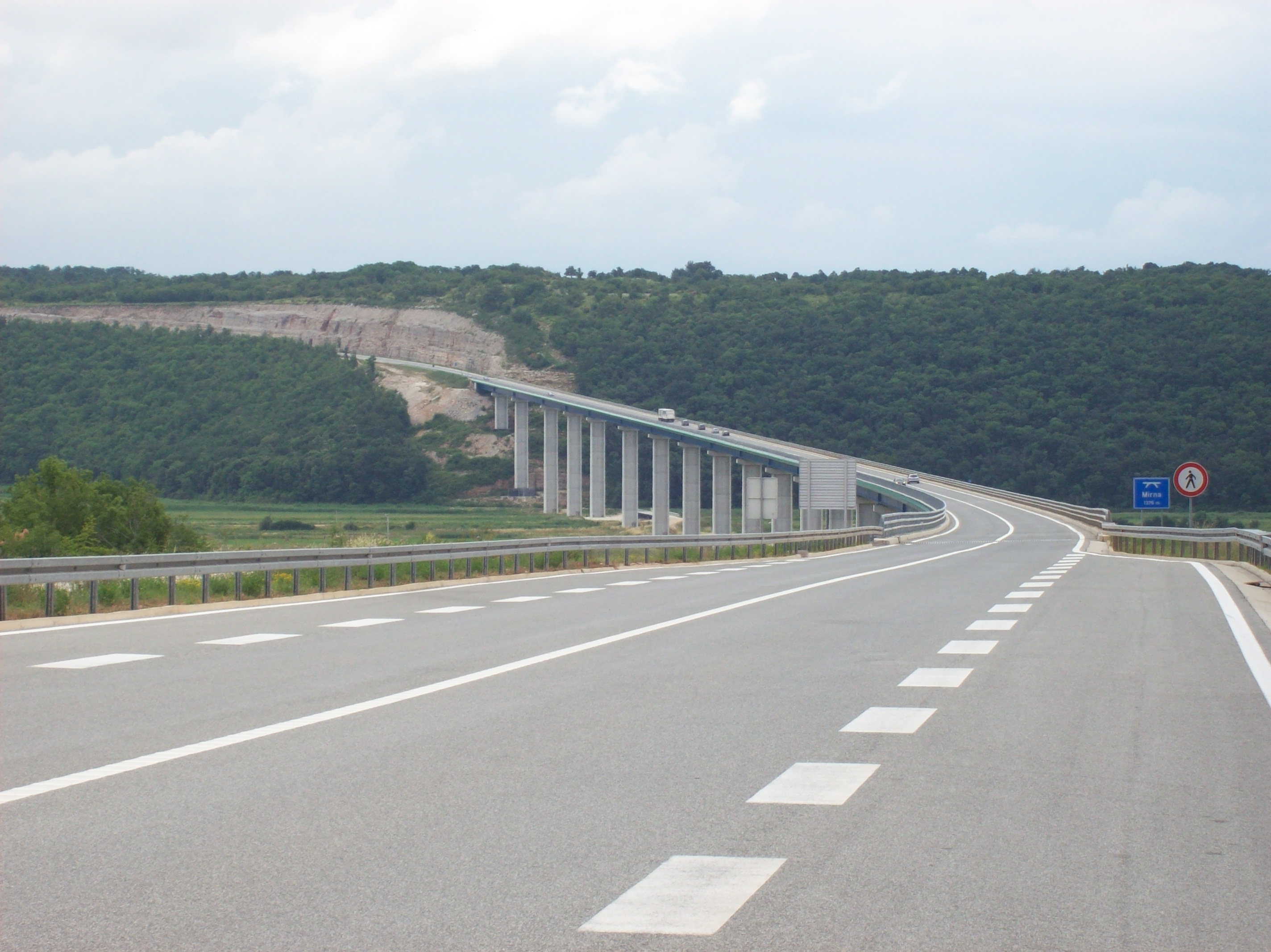
Approach to the Mirna Bridge

Since the first section of the Istrian Y, which constitutes the bulk of the E751 route, started in 1976, with the first section opening in 1981, there were no high-performance road routes in Istria. Instead, the E751 was signposted along state roads, specifically the D66 spanning Rijeka and Pula, and then switched to the D21 in Pula all the way to the Kaštel border crossing. As the Istrian Y system was being developed, the E751 designation was gradually transferred to the new route, with consistent signposting of the E751 along the A9 and the A8, just as the D3 state road designation west of Rijeka was transferred to the B8 and B9 (later replaced by the A8 and A9 respectively).

=== Planned development ===
As of September 2011, there were several plans aimed at the upgrading of the E751 constituent roads in various stages of design or implementation. The A8 route is planned to be upgraded to six-lane motorway standards by its concessionaire, BINA Istra. The upgrade construction works are completed along a 18-kilometre (11 mi) section of the route west of Rogovići, while the remainder was scheduled to be upgraded by late 2014 or early 2015. The A9 motorway is largely complete, and the missing structures required to achieve a full six-lane cross-section of the motorway at the Mirna Bridge and the Limska Draga Viaduct are planned to be completed by 2014. The remaining unbuilt section of the motorway is a short connection to the Slovenian border and planned H5 expressway. The expressway was scheduled to be built after 2013, carrying the E751 to its terminus in Koper.

As of January 2021, the A8's second roadway was complete from Kanfanar to Cerovlje, and works were in progress on the section between Cerovlje and Učka Tunnel, including the construction of a second tube for the Učka Tunnel. The tunnel is scheduled to be completed in 2024. Limska Draga and Mirna viaducts were still two-lane expressways, and construction on the H5 section concurrent with E751 had not yet begun.

== Junction list ==
Country	Region	km	Exit	Name	Destination	Notes
Croatia	Primorje-Gorski Kotar County	0	9	Matulji	A7 E61	The eastern terminus of concurrency with the A8 motorway; trumpet interchange The eastern terminus of the route; eastbound E751 traffic defaults to the A7 motorway (European route E61) and Rijeka bypass
Croatia	Primorje-Gorski Kotar County	1	8b	Opatija	D8	At-grade intersection providing connection to Opatija, Ičići and Lovran (via the D66 road); intersection is regulated using traffic lights.
Croatia	Primorje-Gorski Kotar County	8	8	Veprinac	Ž5048	Connection to Veprinac and Ičići; modified diamond interchange
Croatia	Primorje-Gorski Kotar County	12		Učka Tunnel east toll plaza		Only westbound traffic tolled at this mainline toll plaza
Croatia		15	Učka Tunnel			
Croatia	Istria County	18		Učka Tunnel west toll plaza		Only eastbound traffic tolled at this mainline toll plaza
Croatia	Istria County	18	7	Vranja	D500 Ž5047	Connection to Šušnjevica and Kršan; modified diamond interchange, with rest area integrated into the interchange
Croatia	Istria County	24	6	Lupoglav	D44	Connection to Lupoglav and Buzet; partial cloverleaf interchange
Croatia	Istria County	37	5	Cerovlje	Ž5046	Connection to Cerovlje; diamond/partial cloverleaf hybrid interchange
Croatia	Istria County	42	4	Ivoli	Ž5013	Connection to Pazin (east); diamond interchange
Croatia	Istria County	48	3	Rogovići	D48 Ž5190	Connection to Pazin (west) and Labin via the D64 road; diamond interchange
Croatia	Istria County	58	2	Žminj	Ž5077	Connection to Žminj and Barban; trumpet interchange
Croatia	Istria County	64	1/7	Kanfanar	A9 D303	Connection to Rovinj via the D303 road. Both traffic directions of the A9 at the interchange are designated as the E751, the southern arm of the route, towards Pula is described in the table below. The exit is marked as exit 1 for westbound E751 traffic and exit 7 for westbound E751 traffic. A cloverleaf interchange Western terminus of the A8 motorway concurrency and eastern terminus of the A9 motorway concurrency; E751 traffic flowing along the A9 needs to take an exit at the interchange to proceed towards Matulji and Rijeka.
Croatia	Istria County	67	Limska Draga Viaduct			
Croatia	Istria County	72	6	Medaki	D21	Connection to Vrsar, Funtana and Medaki; partial cloverleaf interchange
Croatia	Istria County	80	5	Baderna	D302	Connection to Poreč and Baderna; partial cloverleaf interchange
Croatia	Istria County	87	4	Višnjan	Ž5042	Connection to Višnjan; trumpet interchange
Croatia	Istria County	99	Mirna Bridge			
Croatia	Istria County	102	3	Nova Vas	D301	Connection to Novigrad, Brtonigla and Nova Vas; partial cloverleaf interchange
Croatia	Istria County	107	2	Buje	D300	Connection to Buje; diamond interchange
Croatia	Istria County			Umag mainline toll plaza		
Croatia	Istria County	113	1	Umag	Ž5002	Connection to Umag; partial cloverleaf interchange
Croatia	Istria County	115			D200	Border access roundabout, where E751 concurrency switches between the A9 and the D510 road and vice versa Connection to Plovanija border crossing via the D200; inside traffic has the right of way.
Croatia	Istria County	116			D21	At-grade intersection, where E751 concurrency switches between the D510 and the D21 road and vice versa as the route spans border crossing Kaštel and the A9 motorway terminus The D21 provides a further junction to Buje to the south.
		117	Border crossing traffic sign	Kaštel/Dragonja border crossing		Border crossing between Croatia and Slovenia; E751 concurrency switches between the Croatian D21 road and Slovenian G1-11 road.
Slovenia	Slovenian Istria	118			R3-628	At-grade intersection, located within Dragonja, and connecting the route to Piran, Portorož, Sečovlje and the Portorož Airport
Slovenia	Slovenian Istria	132	6	Škocjan	H5; H6	A cloverleaf interchange, located within Koper providing connections to the A1 motorway and the Port of Koper via the H5 expressway and Izola via the H6 expressway, as well as to the city of Koper itself. The interchange is a part of the H5. The western terminus of the E751 and end of concurrency with the G1-11 road.
1.000 mi = 1.609 km; 1.000 km = 0.621 mi: Concurrency terminus

=== Kanfanar–Pula arm ===
The entire route is in Istria County, Croatia.

km	Exit	Name	Destination	Notes
64	1/7	Kanfanar	A9; B 8 D303 E751	Connection to Rovinj via the D303 road; The E751 has three arms joined at this interchange—E751 traffic approaching the interchange from direction of Pula may continue along the A9 (E751) towards Umag and Koper, or switch to the A8 (E751) towards Pazin and Rijeka. The exit is marked as number 7 on the A9 and number 1 on the A8.
80	7a	Vodnjan sjever	D21	Connection to Vodnjan (northern approach to the city)
85	8	Vodnjan jug	D21	Connection to Brijuni National Park, Fažana, Galižana and Vodnjan (southern approach to the city)
90		Pula mainline toll plaza		
92	9	Pula	D66 Ž5119	Connection to Pula, Pula Airport (via the D66 and the D401), Port of Pula (via the D66 and the D400), Marčana and Pomer via the Ž5119 (Pula bypass); The southern terminus of the route and end of concurrency of the E751 and the A9.
1.000 mi = 1.609 km; 1.000 km = 0.621 mi: Concurrency terminus

== See also ==
- European long-distance paths
- Road transport
- Highways in Croatia
- Highways in Slovenia
