= A9 (Croatia) =

Motorway in Croatia

A9 motorway
- Autocesta A9
- Istarski ipsilon
- in use other motorways

Route information
- Part of
- Length: 78.3 km (48.7 mi)

Major junctions
- From: D200 and D510 near Plovanija and Kaštel border crossings to Slovenia
- A8 near Kanfanar
- To: D66 near Pula

Location
- Country: Croatia
- Counties: Istria
- Major cities: Umag, Poreč, Rovinj, Pula

Highway system
- Highways in Croatia

The A9 motorway (Croatian: Autocesta A9) is a north–south motorway in Croatia, with a length of 78.3 kilometres (48.7 miles). Beginning in Pula, the largest city on the Istrian peninsula, it runs north to the Croatian motorway and expressway network at the Kanfanar interchange. Here it meets the A8 motorway, forming the Istrian Y road system. The A9 continues north from here to the Kaštel and Plovanija border crossings into Slovenia. The motorway represents a significant north–south transportation corridor in Croatia and is a part of the European route E751. The motorway's national significance is reflected in the positive economic impact on the cities and towns it connects, as well as its importance to tourism in Croatia. Importance of the motorway for tourism is particularly high during summer tourist seasons, when traffic volume increases by more than 80%.

The A9 motorway construction works began in 1988 with its first section opening in 1991, the second one following the next year and extending the completed route to just 13.6 kilometres (8.5 miles). Lack of funding caused delays in further development, and in 1995, BINA Istra was awarded a 32-year build-operate-transfer concession to develop the Istrian Y, including the A9. Construction soon resumed, and by 2006 the entire route was completed as a two-lane expressway with grade separated intersections. In 2008 further construction works were initiated, aimed at upgrading the newly built road to a six-lane motorway. By June 2011 the entire A9 route was brought up to motorway standard, except for the Mirna Bridge and the Limska Draga Viaduct. The motorway is planned to connect to the Slovenian H5 expressway.

The motorway consists of two traffic lanes and an emergency lane in each driving direction, separated by a central reservation, except at the two bridges. All intersections of the A9 motorway are grade separated, and as of September 2011, there are 10 exits and 6 rest areas along the route. Since the motorway is tolled, using a ticket system, each exit includes a toll plaza; and the A9 motorway and the A8 motorway have an integrated toll system in place.

== Route description ==
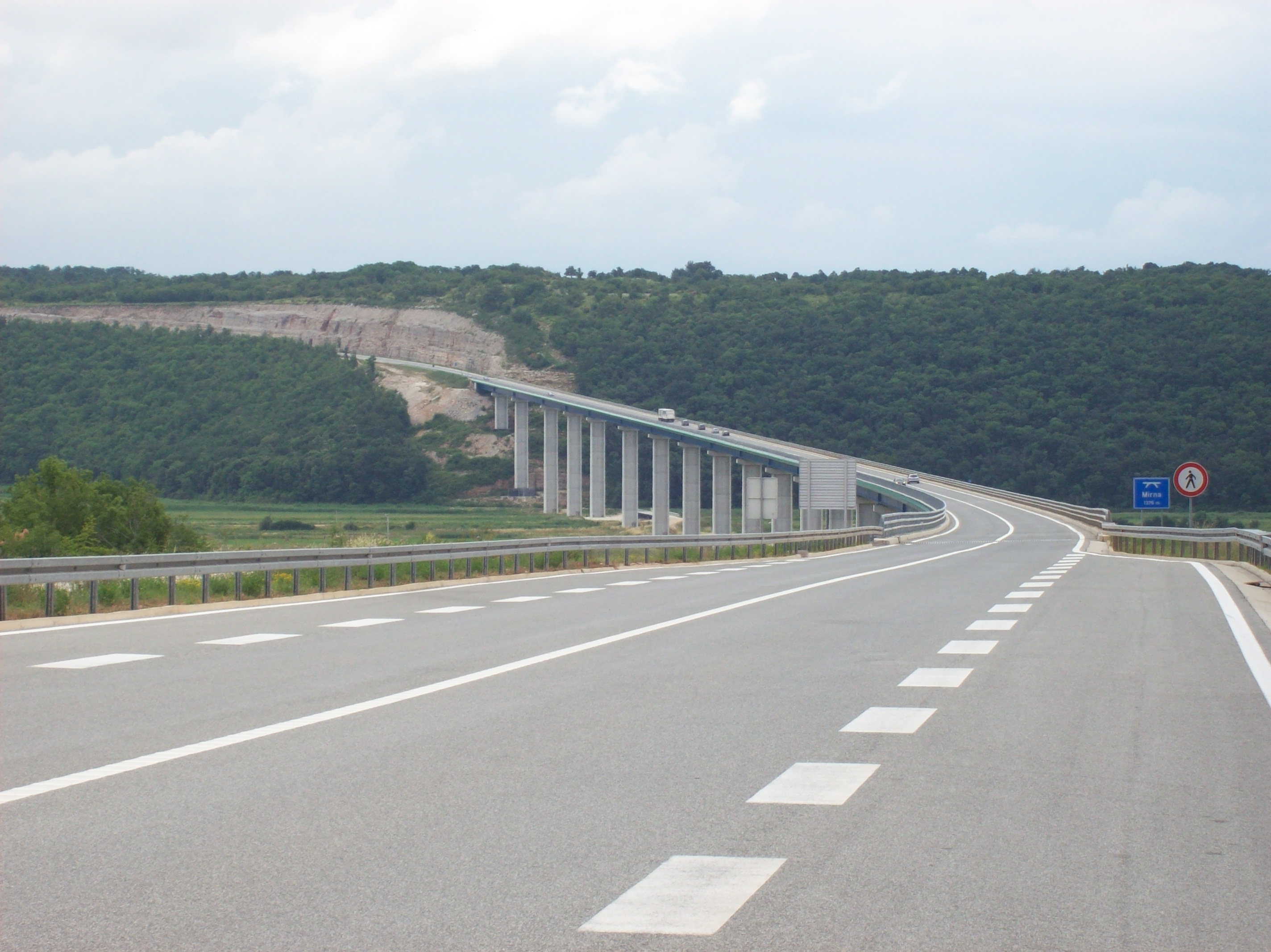
Approach to the Mirna Bridge, four traffic lanes change to two

The A9 motorway spans the peninsula of Istria and is a significant north–south motorway in Croatia connecting Pula, the largest city in the south of the region, to the cities of Rovinj, Poreč, Novigrad, Umag; and ending at Kaštel and Plovanija at the border crossings into Slovenia south of Koper. This part of the road network of Croatia is also a part of European route E751; Koper–Kanfanar–Pula and Kanfanar–Rijeka. The motorway is of major importance to Croatia in terms of economic development, especially for tourism and as a transit and transport route. The road carries significant transit and tourist traffic as it runs along Adriatic Sea coast linking a large number of tourist resorts.

The motorway runs for 78.3 kilometres (48.7 miles) between the border crossing access roundabout—the junction of the D200 and D510 state roads—at its northern end and the D66 state road serving Pula and Pula Airport at its southern end. The route connects towns and resorts in the western, southern and central parts of Istria through a total of 9 interchanges and the state road network acting as feeder roads. The route largely runs about 5 kilometres (3.1 miles) inland relative to the west coast of Istria, serving a number of tourist resorts, such as Savudrija and Umag via the eponymous interchange with the Ž5002 and Ž5003 county roads, and Novigrad via the D301. There is also an alternate, southern link to Umag via the D300 state road. This part of the route generally follows a north–south path as it approaches Mirna river. After crossing the river the route turns southeast towards Višnjan. Thereafter, the A9 route resumes the original north–south orientation to Baderna interchange with the D302 road serving Poreč and Medaki interchange with the D21 road. The D21 runs generally parallel to the A9 and it is accessible from all A9 interchanges directly or through short connectors. From there, the route again turns to the southeast to cross the Lim valley. After crossing the valley, which is spanned by the Limska Draga Viaduct it reaches the Kanfanar interchange. The interchange is a junction of the A9 and the A8 routes forming the Istrian Y system, while providing access to Rovinj via the D303 road. Between Kanfanar and Pula, the route turns more to the south and gradually approaches the west coast of the peninsula, bypassing Vodnjan and providing access to Fažana and Brijuni National Park. The route terminates in Pula interchange with the D66 road and the Pula bypass road.

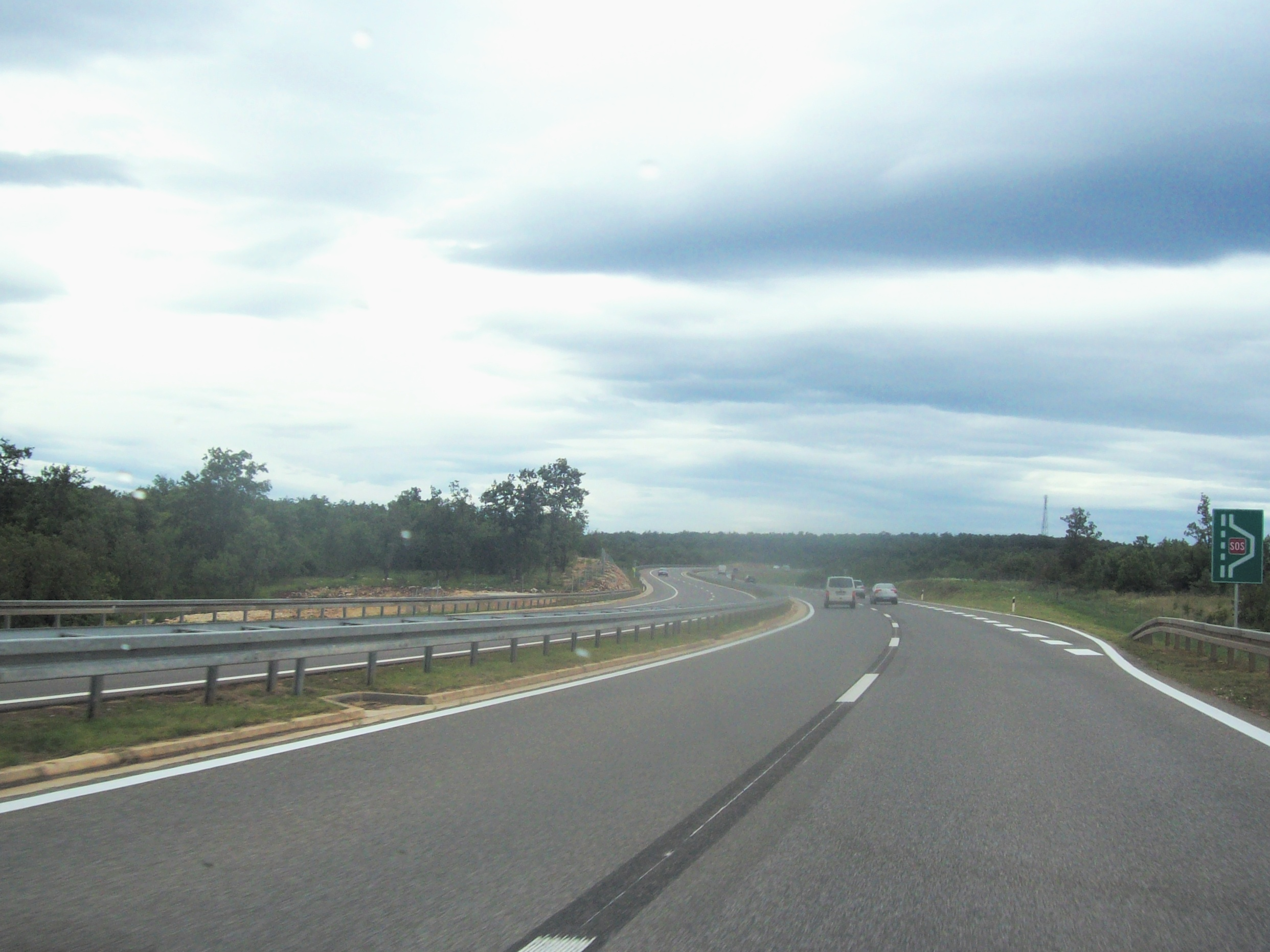
Sections with no emergency lanes have lay-bys provided

The A9 motorway has at least two traffic lanes and an emergency lane in each direction along its entire length, except at the Mirna Bridge and the Limska Draga Viaduct where there are two traffic lanes instead. The motorway comprises several types of interchanges at the motorway exits: At Kanfanar and Pula there are cloverleaf interchanges; Višnjan and both Vodnjan exits are trumpet interchanges; Buje exit is a diamond interchange; and the rest are partial cloverleaf interchanges. There are a number of rest areas along the motorway providing various types of services, ranging from simple parking spaces and restrooms to filling stations and other facilities. As of September 2011 the motorway has ten interchanges, in addition to the roundabout at the northern terminus, providing access to numerous towns and cities and the Croatian state road network.

An automatic traffic monitoring and guidance system is in place along the motorway. It consists of measuring, control and signalling devices located in zones where driving conditions may vary; such as at interchanges, viaducts, bridges and zones where fog and strong wind are known to occur. The system uses variable traffic signs to communicate changing driving conditions, possible restrictions, and other information to motorway users. The A9 motorway mainly runs through the coastal plains and rolling hills of Istria, although the northern part of the route traverses two large valleys, requiring two large structures, the Mirna Bridge and the Limska Draga Viaduct, to carry the route across.

== Toll ==
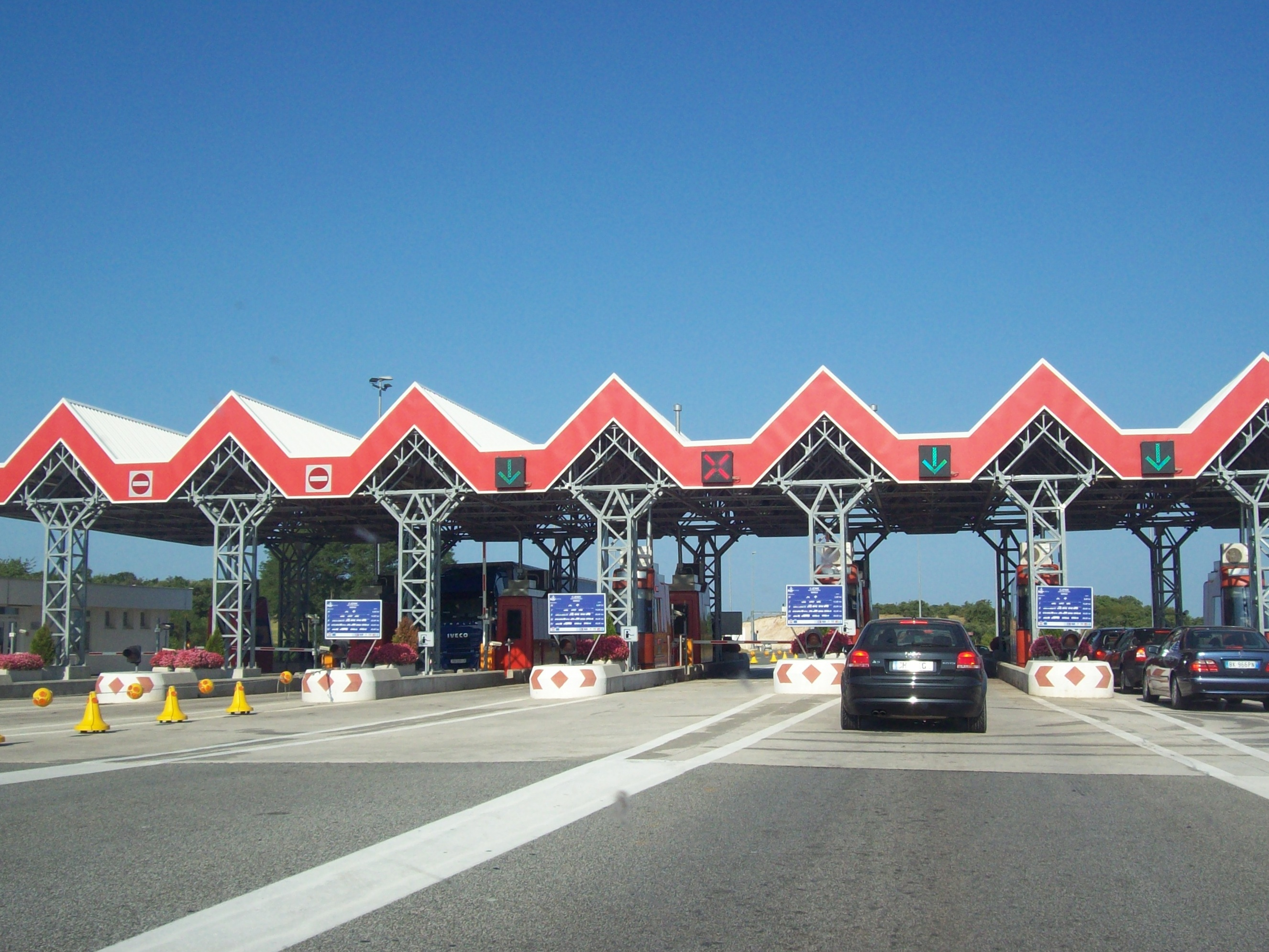
Former Mirna Bridge toll plaza, 2009

The A9 is a tolled motorway and uses a closed toll system based on the Croatian toll categories. The ticket system was introduced all along the Istrian Y system as of June 2011. Tolls charged along the A9 motorway vary depending on the length of route travelled, and ranges from 3.00 kuna (€0.40) to 26.00 kuna (€3.51) for passenger cars and 15.00 kuna (€2.02) to 185.00 kuna (€25.00) for semi-trailer trucks. The toll is payable in either Croatian kuna or euros using major credit cards, debit cards and a number of prepaid toll collection systems. The latter includes various types of smart cards issued by the motorway operator and "ENC", an electronic toll collection (ETC) system which is shared at most motorways in Croatia and provides drivers with discounted toll rates for dedicated lanes at toll plazas.

The operator of the motorway, BINA Istra, reported 65.8 million kuna (8.9 million euro) of income in the first half of 2011; an increase of 30.8 percent compared to the same period in the previous year. The figure includes the entire Istrian Y system, i.e. the A9 motorway and the A8 motorway. A major factor causing the increase is attributed to the introduction of the closed toll system, where tolls are charged at every junction, which replaced an open toll system where the toll was charged at the Mirna Bridge and the Učka Tunnel only.

== Notable structures ==
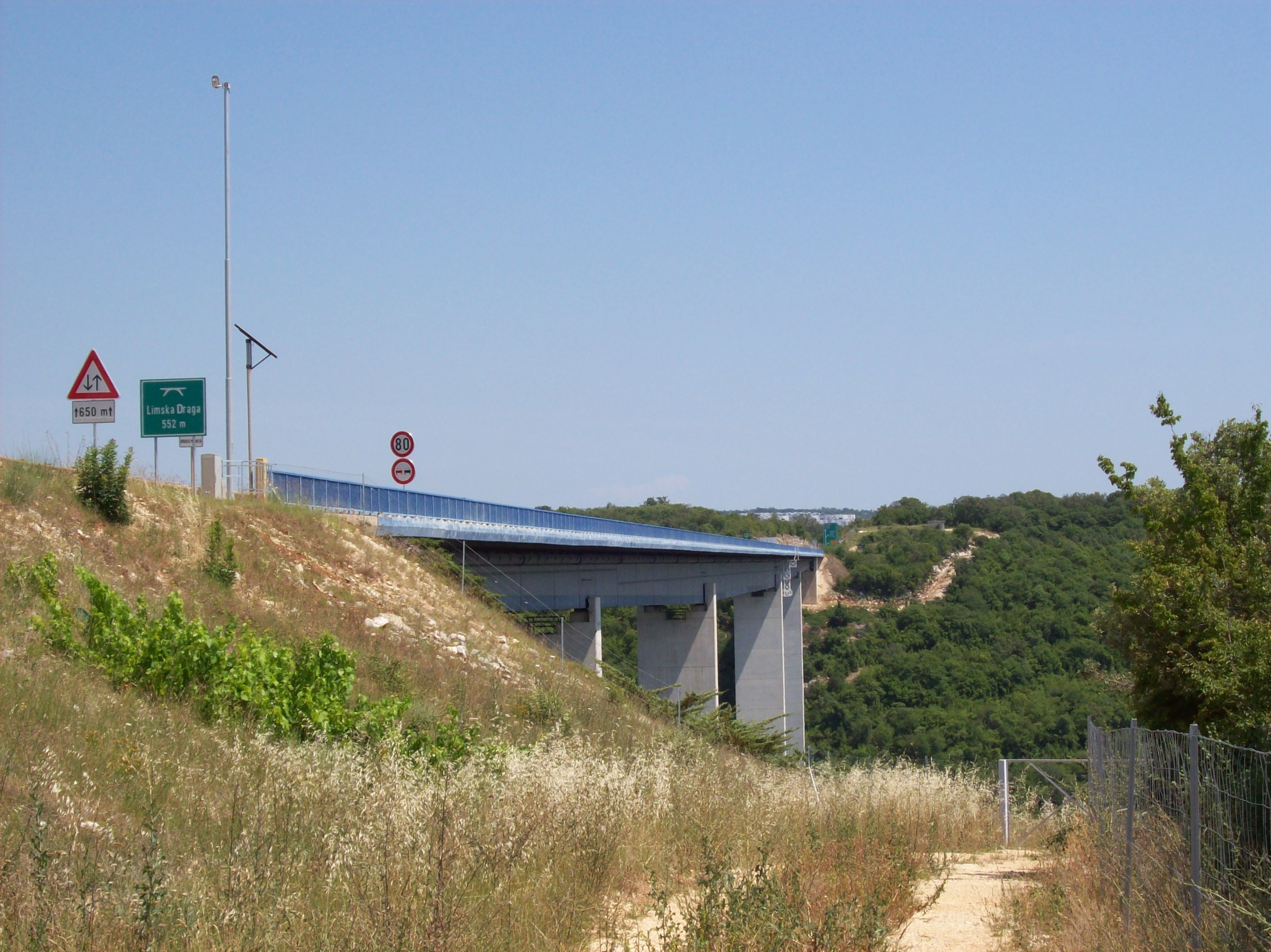
Limska Draga Viaduct

The Mirna Bridge and the Limska Draga Viaduct are the longest individual structures on the A9 motorway. The Mirna Bridge is the most significant structure built on the route, spanning the Mirna River to carry the motorway across the river and its valley, and has been in use since 2005. The bridge is 1,354 metres (4,442 feet) long, while the superstructure of the bridge is 10.1 metres (33 feet) wide. Prior to the introduction of the ticket system on the A9, a toll was charged for using the bridge. As of September 2011 the bridge consists of a single carriageway. The Limska Draga Viaduct was built in 1991 to span the Limska Draga valley. The viaduct is 522 metres (1,713 feet) long, and 12.1 metres (40 feet) wide and, therefore, is the second longest structure of the motorway. It comprises continuous box girders of varying depth, across five spans with a maximum height of 125 metres (410 feet). The viaduct has been incorporated into the A9 motorway route since 1999. Like the Mirna Bridge, as of December 2011, the viaduct comprises a single carriageway.

== History ==
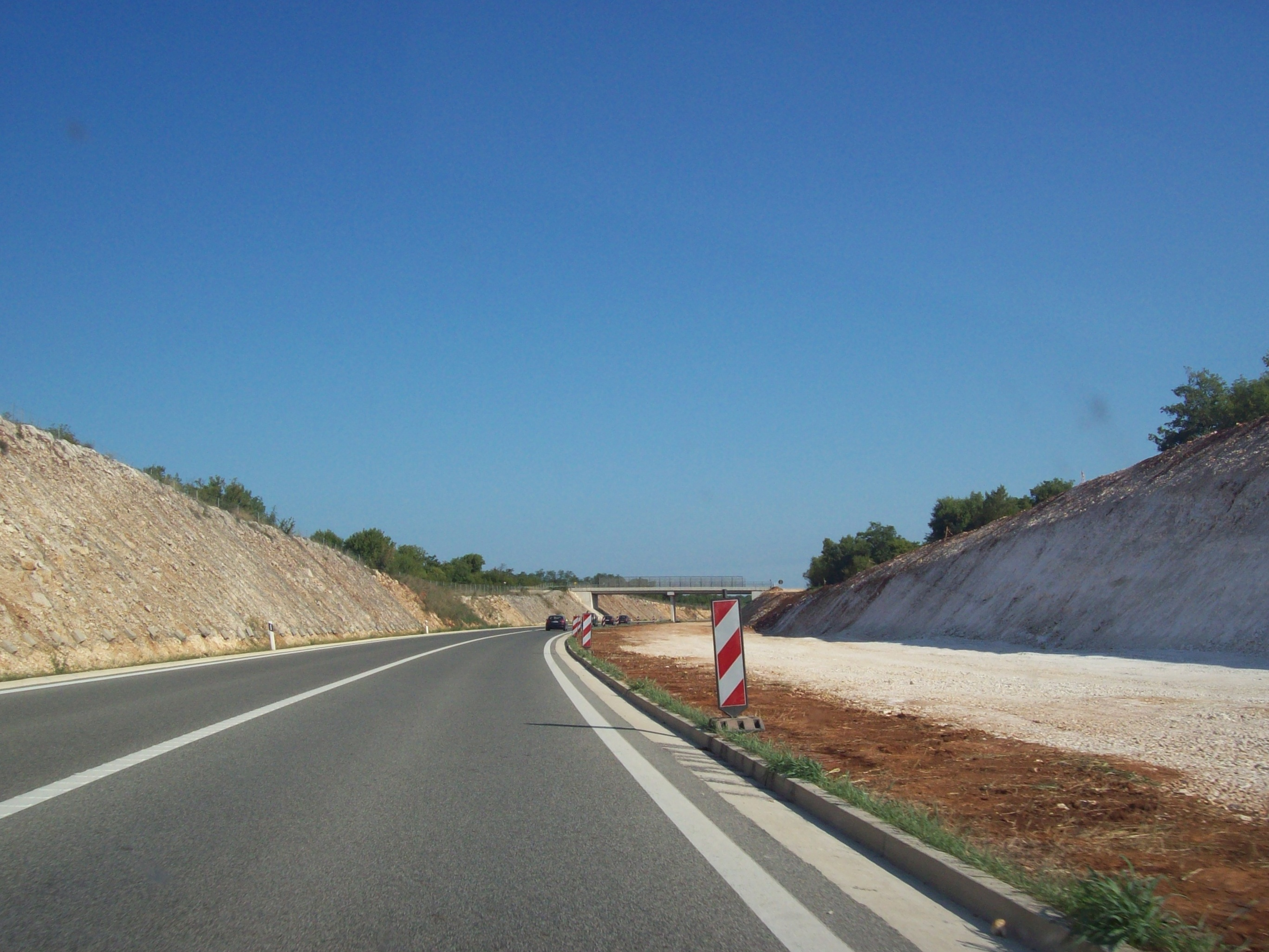
The A9 during its upgrade to four lanes, 2009

Construction of the A9 motorway, and the Istrian Y as a whole, began in 1968 when the Croatian Parliament endorsed a petition of its members from Istria to promote construction of a modern road between the Istria peninsula and the rest of Croatia. Subsequently, municipalities in Istria started a public loan to fund construction of the Učka Tunnel, which started in 1976. The works were completed in 1981 and also included construction of a 22.6 kilometres (14.0 miles) long two-lane expressway section between Matulji and Lupoglav. The "Y" shape, formed by the A9 motorway and the A8 expressway, was originally defined by Rijeka and Istria spatial planning documents and later incorporated in the spatial planning documents of the Republic of Croatia in 1988—defining the Kanfanar interchange as a junction between the A9 and A8 routes.

The first section of the A9 to be built was a 7.4-kilometre (4.6 mi) section between Medaki and Kanfanar. Its construction started in 1988 and was completed in 1991, including the 552-metre (1,811 ft) viaduct across the Lim Valley. The 6.2-kilometre (3.9 mi) section between Buje and Nova Vas was built between 1990 and 1992. Between 1997 and 1999 all sections between Medaki and Vodnjan were completed. The construction works on the section between Umag and Medaki started in 2003 and were completed by 2005. Finally, construction of the southernmost section between Vodnjan and Pula started in 2005, and was completed by the end of the 2006; marking completion of the Istrian Y as a two-lane expressway with grade–separated intersections.

Upgrading the expressway to a four-lane motorway started on October 6, 2008. The upgrade was scheduled to take place in two stages, designated by the BINA Istra as 2A and 2B. The 2A stage entailed construction of the second carriageway between Umag and Pula, except at the Mirna Bridge and the Limska Draga Viaduct. The upgrade of the Pula–Kanfanar interchange section of the A9, approximately 30 kilometres (19 miles) long, was completed on June 20, 2010. At that moment a ticket system was introduced at section as the first tolled portion of the motorway that included the Mirna Bridge. On June 28, 2010, the northern terminus of the A9 motorway was completed with an access roundabout where two connector roads to the border crossings of Kaštel and Plovanija on the Slovenian border intersected it. The upgrade construction works continued in the remaining part of the motorway encompassed by the 2A stage, and the 50-kilometre (31 mi) section between the Kanfanar interchange and Umag was upgraded to a four-lane motorway by June 14, 2011; eight months ahead of schedule. Total costs of the upgrade to the A9 motorway were 228 million euros.

Since September 21, 1995, the motorway has been operated by the BINA Istra company, as part of a 32-year build-operate-transfer concession contract. The concession provided for the takeover of the existing 54-kilometre (34 mi) section of the road, and a completed tube of the Učka Tunnel. The concession agreement also mandated construction, maintenance and management of the roads, and their upgrade to motorway standards (dual carriageway), when the annual average daily traffic (AADT) reaches 10,000 vehicles; or when the average summer daily traffic reaches 16,000 vehicles. The latter was achieved in 2005, and the motorway upgrade works started in 2008—even though the AADT at the time was only 8,500 vehicles.

== Further construction ==
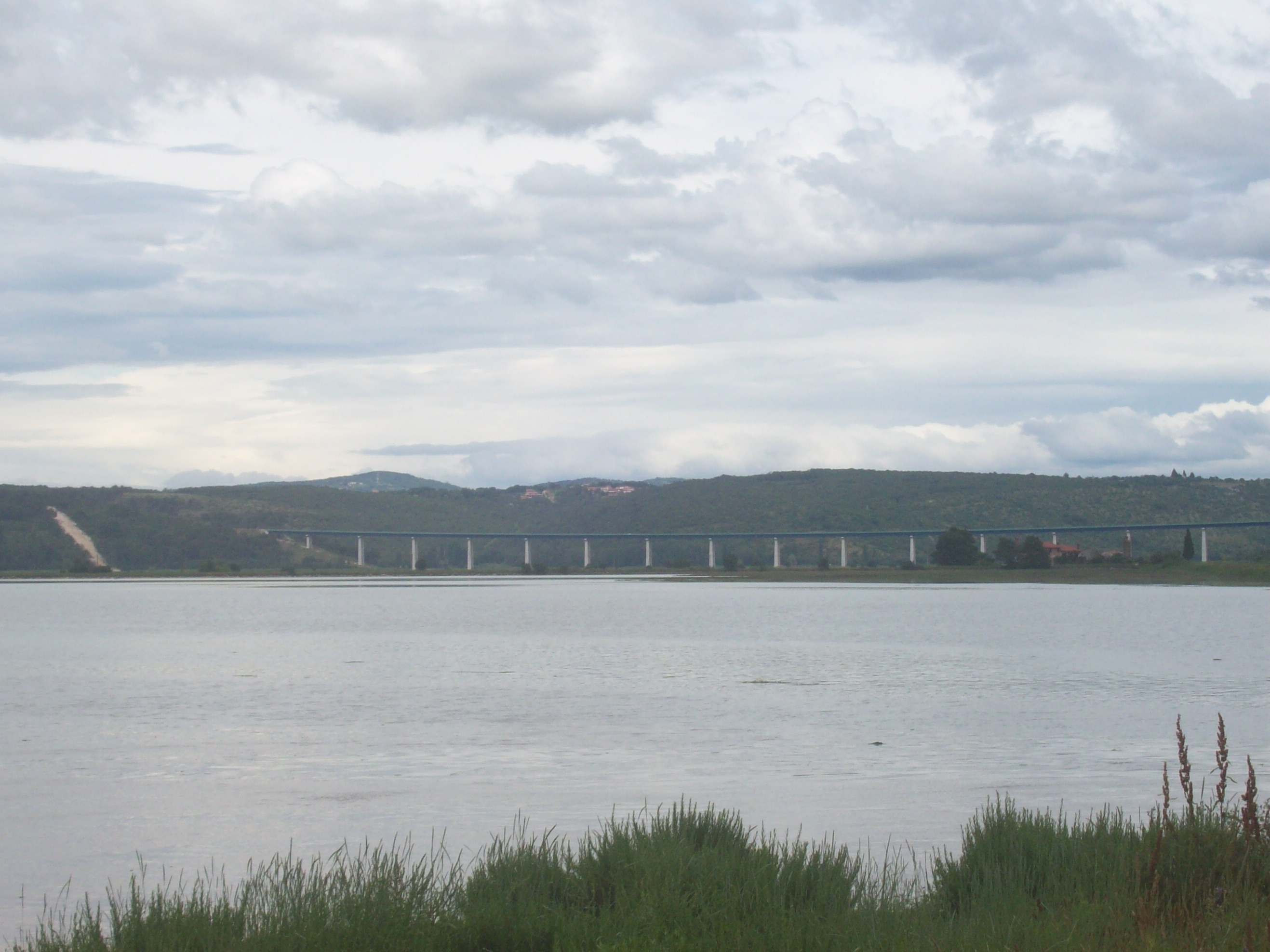
Mirna Bridge is the longest structure of the A9

The 2B2 stage of the upgrade to be carried out along the A9 includes construction of parallel structures at the Mirna Bridge and the Limska Draga Viaduct intended for each to carry an additional carriageway of the motorway. The construction of the Mirna and Limska draga viaducts and the stop lane on certain sections will follow the completion of works on the second pipe of the Učka tunnel, and by agreement between Bina-Istra and the concession providers.

The final section of the motorway, the northernmost section between the Umag interchange and the Slovenian border at Kaštel and Dragonja border crossing, is currently spanned by a two-lane connector road via a roundabout located at the provisional northern terminus of the A9. Since the Kaštel and Dragonja border crossing is the agreed contact point for the motorway link between Croatia and Slovenia, the section is expected to be built when Slovenia completes its H5 expressway; connecting the border crossing to Koper and its motorway system. The Slovenian motorway development company DARS made plans in 2010 to build the expressway, but as of 2021 no progress has been achieved.

== Traffic volume ==
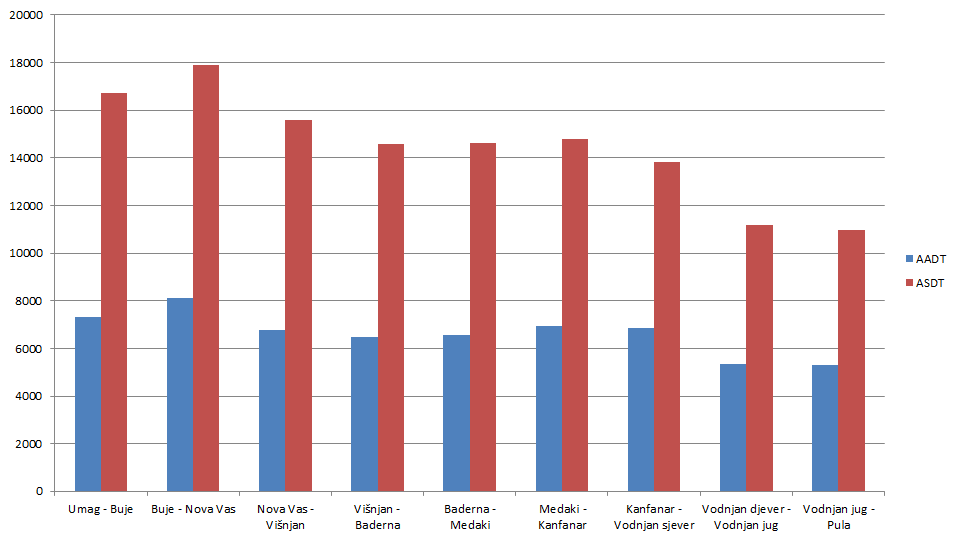
A9 traffic volume by section (2015)

Traffic is regularly counted and reported by BINA Istra, operator of the motorway, and results are published by Hrvatske ceste. In 2015 the largest annual average daily traffic (AADT) volume was recorded in the Buje–Nova Vas section.

Variations between AADT and average summer daily traffic (ASDT) traffic volumes are attributed to the fact that the motorway carries substantial tourist traffic to the Adriatic Sea resorts along the Istria peninsula. On average, the A9 motorway carries 218% more ASDT than AADT. The largest increase of the ASDT relative to the AADT is observed on the Nova Vas–Višnjan section, at 229%. BINA Istra expects the motorway to carry more than 20,000 vehicles per day during peak tourist season periods.

A9 traffic volume details
Road	Counting site	AADT (2015)	ASDT (2015)	Notes
A9	2729 Umag south	7,324	16,715	Between Umag and Buje interchanges.
A9	2731 Buje south	8,113	17,877	Between Buje and Nova Vas interchanges.
A9	2733 Nova Vas south	6,788	15,567	Between Nova Vas and Baderna interchanges.
A9	2735 Višnjan south	6,486	14,597	Between Baderna and Medaki interchanges.
A9	2737 Baderna south	6,563	14,622	Between Baderna and Medaki interchanges.
A9	2739 Medaki south	6,949	14,808	Between Medaki and Kanfanar interchanges.
A9	2727 Kanfanar south	6,875	13,831	Between Kanfanar and Vodnjan sjever (north) interchanges.
A9	3907 Vodnjan sjever south	5,350	11,158	Between Vodnjan sjever (north) and Vodnjan jug (south) interchanges.
A9	3909 Vodnjan jug south	5,321	10,988	Between Vodnjan jug (south) and Pula interchanges.
Source: Hrvatske ceste

== Rest areas ==
There are six rest areas along the A9 motorway. Legislation identifies four types of rest areas, designated as types A through D: A-type rest areas comprise a full range of amenities, including a filling station, a restaurant and a hotel or motel; B-type rest areas have no lodging; C-type rest areas are very common and include a filling station and a café, but no restaurants or accommodations; D-type rest areas offer parking spaces, restrooms, and possibly picnicking tables and benches. Even though rest areas found along the A9 motorway generally follow this ranking system, there are considerable variations, as some of them offer extra services. The filling stations regularly have small convenience stores, and some of them may offer LPG fuel.

The primary motorway operator, BINA Istra, leases A, B and C type rest areas to various operators through public tenders. Rest area operators are not permitted to sub-lease the fuel operations. As of September 2011 there are two type C rest areas, and only one operator present on the A9 motorway: INA. The rest areas are accessible from both directions of the motorway and are open 24 hours a day, 7 days a week.

List of A9 motorway rest areas
County	km	Name	Operators	Type	Notes
Istria	6.3	Buje		D	There are parking areas and restrooms at the Buje rest area.
Istria	24.8	Mirna		D	There are parking areas and restrooms at the Mirna rest area.
Istria	35.6	Bačva	INA	C	There are a filling station, selling petrol and diesel fuel, a café and restrooms at the Bačva rest area.
Istria	51.5	Limska Draga		D	There are parking areas and restrooms at the Limski rest area.
Istria	61.6	Bale		D	There are a café and restrooms at the Bale rest area.
Istria	76.5	Pula	INA	C	There are a filling station, selling petrol and diesel fuel, a café and restrooms at the Pula rest area.
1.000 mi = 1.609 km; 1.000 km = 0.621 mi

== Exit list ==
County	km	Exit	Name	Destination	Notes
Istria	3.1	-	Border access roundabout	D200 D510 E751	Connection to Kaštel and Plovanija border crossings to Slovenia via D200 and D510 state roads, respectively; From those points the route continues through Slovenia as route 111 and 11, respectively, towards Slovenian A1 motorway and Trieste, Italy. The motorway is planned to be extended to the Slovenian border, to continue as H5 expressway (planned). The northern terminus of the European route E751 concurrency; The northern terminus of the motorway
Istria	4.6	1	Umag	D75	Connection to Umag; The northernmost completed interchange of the A9 motorway; The northbound A9 traffic defaults to a 1.5 kilometres (0.93 mi) two-lane connector road terminating at a roundabout junction with the D200 and D510 state roads.
Istria			Umag mainline toll plaza		
Istria	6.3		Buje rest area		
Istria	10.6	2	Buje	D200 D300	Connection to Buje and Umag
Istria	16.3	3	Novigrad	D44 D301	Connection to Novigrad, Nova Vas and Brtonigla
Istria	18.9	Mirna Bridge			
Istria	24.8		Mirna rest area		
Istria	30.9	4	Višnjan	Ž5042	Connection to Višnjan
Istria	35.6		Bačva		
Istria	38.1	5	Baderna	D48 D302	Connection to Poreč and Baderna
Istria	46.4	6	Medaki	Ž5209	Connection to Funtana, Vrsar and Medaki
Istria	51.5		Limska Draga rest area		
Istria	52.1	Limska Draga Viaduct			
Istria	53.6	7	Rovinj	A8 D303 E751	Connection to A8 motorway towards Rijeka (also designated E751), and to Rovinj via D303 state road
Istria	61.6		Bale rest area		
Istria	69.0	8	Vodnjan sjever (north)	D75	Connection to Vodnjan
Istria	74.0	9	Vodnjan jug (south)	D75	Connection to Vodnjan, Galižana, Fažana and Brijuni National Park
Istria	76.5		Pula rest area		
Istria	80.1		Pula mainline toll plaza		
Istria	81.4	10	Pula	D66 E751 Ž5200	Connection to Pula, Pula Airport and Marčana, as well as to Pula ferry port via D400 state road An additional connecting road, originating in the interchange, and acting as an additional Pula bypass road, terminating in Pomer, is completed and in use as of July 6, 2011. The eastern terminus of the European route E751 concurrency; The southern terminus of the road
1.000 mi = 1.609 km; 1.000 km = 0.621 mi: Concurrency terminus

== See also ==
- International E-road network
- Transport in Croatia
