= D21 road (Croatia) =

Road in Croatia

D21 state road
- Map of Croatia with D21 highlighted in red

Route information
- Part of E751
- Maintained by Hrvatske ceste
- Length: 80.1 km (49.8 mi)
- Existed: 1997–2013

Major junctions
- North end: Slovenian G11 at Kaštel border crossing to Slovenia
- D300 in Buje; D44 in Ponte Porton; D301 in Ponte Porton; D302 near Baderna; A9 in Medaki; D303 near Svetvinčenat; A9 in Vodnjan north; A9 in Vodnjan south interchanges

- South end: D400 in Pula

Location
- Country: Croatia
- Counties: Istria
- Major cities: Buje, Vodnjan, Pula

Highway system
- Highways in Croatia
← D20	→ D22

D21 was an 80.1-kilometre-long (49.8 mi), north–south state road in Istria County, Croatia. A short section of D21 was part of the European route E751. The northern terminus of the route was located at the Croatia–Slovenia border at the Dragonja River. There it connected to Koper, Slovenia, and Trieste, Italy, via the Slovene route G11 further north. The route was generally parallel to A9 motorway, with which it formed several junctions, either directly or via short connectors, at Buje, Bale and Vodnjan – towns served directly by D21. The southern terminus of the route was found in the city of Pula, at the southern tip of the Istrian Peninsula.

The road, as well as all other state roads in Croatia, was managed and maintained by Hrvatske ceste, a state-owned company. The road carried an annual average daily traffic of about 2,000 vehicles, and the traffic volume increased by up to 1,000 vehicles in summer as the road was used by tourists in the region. The southernmost portion of the road was significantly more congested as it carries Pula suburban traffic.

In classical antiquity, the western Istria route was first used by Via Flavia in the classical antiquity, but the roads in the area declined in the Middle Ages and subsequent division of the Istrian Peninsula by the Republic of Venice and the Habsburg Empire was not conductive to development of a road system. In the 19th century, the First French Empire started road construction, including the Trieste–Pula route now largely followed by D21. The route was a part of M2 Adriatic Highway route after the Second World War. It was made a separate state road and assigned the D21 route number in 1997. In 2013, the road was abolished because of the creation of parallel D75 road, located west of the A9 motorway.

== Route description ==
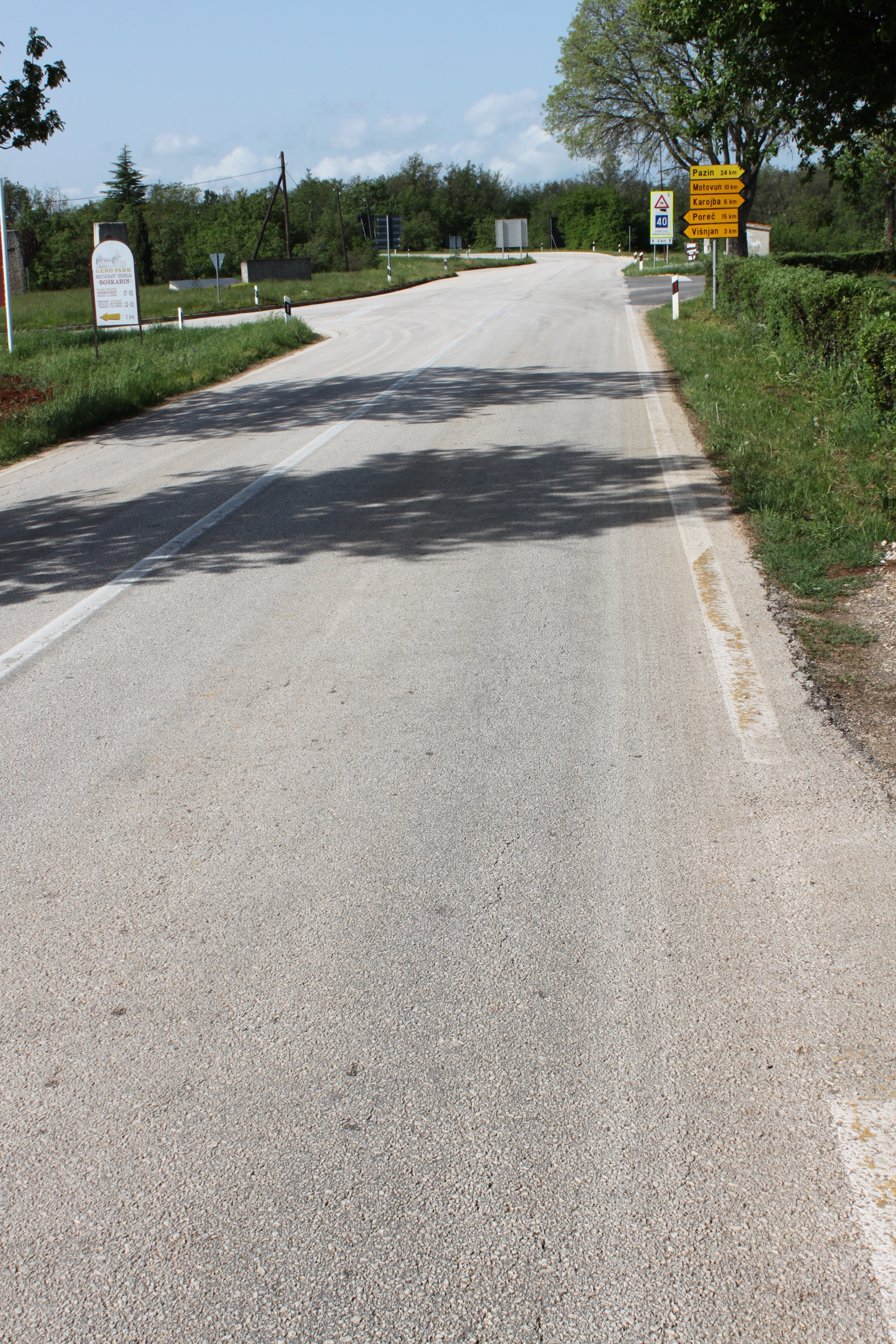
D21 road (facing north) at the Ž5042 junction near Višnjan

D21 was an 80.1-kilometre (49.8 mi) state road situated in Istria County following a general north–south alignment. Most of the route ran through predominantly agricultural land and small settlements, except the route segment between Bale and Baderna, where the road was predominantly surrounded by forests. The southernmost 2.2 kilometres (1.4 miles) of the route ran through suburbs of Pula – the largest city in the region. D21 extended south from the Kaštel border crossing between Croatia and Slovenia situated at the Dragonja River. To the north of the D21 terminus, the route – a part of the European route E751 – connected the cities of Koper, Slovenia, and Trieste, Italy, via G11 in Slovenia.

The first section of the D21 route followed an overall eastern orientation. About 400 metres (1,300 feet) away from the borderline, it reaches the Kaštel border crossing, and after 800 metres (2,600 feet), there is an at-grade intersection where the traffic defaults to D510, which serves as a connector to the A9 motorway. D21 itself turns southwest towards the village of Kaštel, approximately two kilometres (1.2 mi) away.

Just to the north of Kaštel, D21 turned south before proceeding to the town of Buje located about 3.5 kilometres (2.2 miles) down the road from Kaštel. In Buje, D21 forms at-grade intersections with D200 and D300. D200 provides a route to the Plovanija border crossing with Slovenia and D300 to the town of Umag and Umag interchange of A9 motorway. There are also at-grade intersections with the Ž5007 and Ž5008 county roads in the town. South of Buje, the route turns southeast across hilly terrain until it reaches Ponte Portone in the Mirna River valley approximately 11 kilometres (6.8 miles) away from Buje. There D21 formed a roundabout junction at the north bank of the river. The roundabout connected D21 to D44, which links the town of Buzet to the east, and to D301 which links the town of Novigrad and another A9 interchange to the west.

After the route crossed the Mirna River, it continued about six kilometres (3.7 mi) southeast to Vižinada, where D21 forms an intersection with Ž5041 county road to Kaštelir and Poreč. After Vižinada, the route continued another five kilometres (3.1 mi) south, where it reached the Ž5042 intersection connecting Višnjan. Approximately nine kilometres (5.6 mi) south, at Baderna, D21 connects with D302 extending to Poreč and the A9 motorway, located west of the road junction, as well as D48 leading to Pazin east of D21. The intersection is built as a partial cloverleaf interchange.

Approximately four kilometres (2.5 mi) south of Baderna, the route reached the village of Sveti Lovreč and continued south to the Medaki interchange of the A9 – another partial cloverleaf interchange – about three kilometres (1.9 mi) south of Sveti Lovreč. D21 turned southwest at the Lim embayment of the Adriatic Sea after another two kilometres (1.2 mi). At that point, D21 formed an at-grade intersection with Ž5002 road to Vrsar situated further west. Following the Ž5002 junction, D21 turns southeast to follow the contours of the Lim embayment valley. After approximately five kilometres (3.1 mi), the route reached a grade separated intersection, a two-ramp partial cloverleaf, with D303. D303, in turn, links to the Kanfanar interchange of the A9 motorway and the coastal city of Rovinj.

South of the D303 intersection, D21 ran south along a generally flat terrain and consisted of relatively straight sections compared to the northern parts of the route. About six kilometres (3.7 mi) south of the D303 junction, D21 formed an at-grade intersection with Ž5098 to Svetvinčenat. Three kilometres (1.9 mi) from there, D21 entered Bale and intersected the Ž5096 road connecting Rovinj to the northwest. South of Bale, D21 turns southeast and approaches Vodnjan. It reaches a short connector to the Vodnjan-sjever (north) interchange of the A9 motorway eight kilometres (5.0 mi) down the road.

After another two kilometres (1.2 mi), D21 reached Vodnjan and the Ž5192 road junction connecting to Fažana. There are two further significant junctions of D21 in the next 1.5 kilometres (0.93 miles) – one with Ž5190 to Svetvinčenat and the other with the Vodnjan-jug (south) interchange of A9. South of Vodnjan, D21 route continued another 5.5 kilometres (3.4 miles) south to reach Ž5117 connecting the village of Galižana, and reached outskirts of Pula after another three kilometres (1.9 mi). Within Pula, D21 route formed an at-grade junction with the Ž5115 road to Fažana about 1.5 kilometres (0.93 miles) further along. The junction also serves the Brijuni National Park. The southern terminus of the route is found at a roundabout 500 metres (1,600 feet) further south, where D21 connected to D400.

== History ==
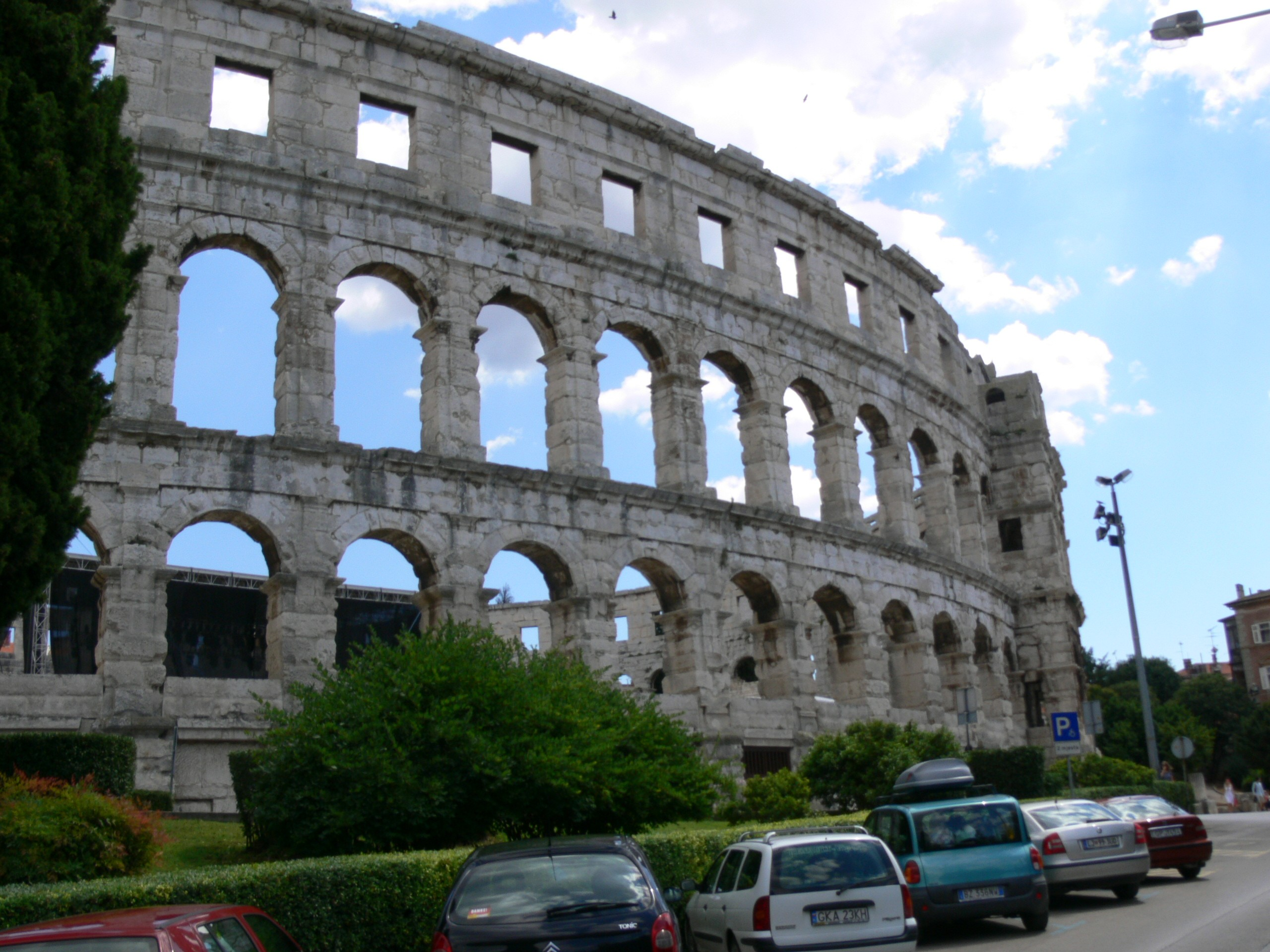
Pula, the southern extent of D21 route

In classical antiquity, the Via Flavia road built by the emperor Vespasian in 78 AD ran through the same area spanned by modern D21. The Via Flavia followed a north–south route in the western part of the Istrian Peninsula, connecting Tergeste, present-day Trieste, to Pula via Poreč. In Pula, the Roman road extended further to the northeast to Nesactium and Tarsatica – modern-day Trsat area of the city of Rijeka.

Following the decline of the Roman Empire, roads in the region deteriorated. Only the Via Sclavonica is known to have existed in the region by year 1030. It was an east–west route spanning from Pazin to Poreč. Road transport in the region lost significance after the peninsula was divided between the Habsburg monarchy and the Republic of Venice. From 1809 to 1813, the Trieste–Pula route was rebuilt by the First French Empire, after the French captured the entire region from Venice and the Habsburgs. Upgrades to the regional road network continued after the Austrian Empire acquired Istria at the 1814–1815 Congress of Vienna. By 1830, the road network in Istria had expanded to a degree that would not change for a century and a half. The only significant improvement of region's roads was paving of the Trieste–Pula road in 1930s.

During the Second World War all the roads in Istria sustained significant damage. After the war the road became a part of the Adriatic Highway – a trunk road tracing the Adriatic Sea coast within the SFR Yugoslavia, signposted as M2 route. The next major addition to the road network on the peninsula was completion of the first section of the Istrian Y expressway in 1981. The system was designed to replace M2 route as the main road route in Istria. The Yugoslav M2 designation was retained after the independence of Croatia, until 1997, when the part of the Adriatic Highway spanning the Slovene border and Pula was designated as state road D21. Since October 1991, Hrvatske ceste, a company owned by the Government of Croatia, has been tasked with maintenance of the road. In 2013, following a new classification, the coastal county roads were classified as D75 state road and thus, D21 lost on its importance and was declassified. The present-day route of the D21 consist of short, one kilometre (0.62 mi) section of D510, 45.8-kilometre (28.5 mi) section of Ž5209 county road, forming its northern half and 32.7-kilometre (20.3 mi) section of D75, forming its southern half.

== Traffic volume ==
Volume of traffic flowing along D21 road was measured by Hrvatske ceste at six traffic counting stations distributed along the route. Three of the traffic counting stations work continuously, while the rest of them are operated intermittently. By 2002, the road lost a significant portion of its north–south traffic as A9 motorway was gradually extended since 1991, running parallel to the route. At the Kaštel traffic counting site, the average summer traffic volume declined from 12,564 vehicles per day recorded in 2002, to just 2,989 vehicles in 2011.

D21 traffic volume (2010)
Counting site	AADT	ASDT	Notes
2702 Kaštel	1,952	2,989	Adjacent to the Kaštel border crossing
2707 Sveti Ivan	1,980	2,510	Adjacent to the Ž5008 junction
2719 Vižinada north	1,414	2,262	Between the D44 and the Ž5041 junctions
2721 Baderna north	1,925	2,478	Adjacent to the D48 junction
2717 Bale	2,366	3,148	Between the Ž5098 and the Ž5096 junctions
3905 Pula north	10,696	13,527	Between the Ž5115 and the Ž5117 junctions

== Major intersections ==
The entire route is in Istria County.

Location	km	mi	Destinations	Notes
Kaštel border crossing	0.0	0.0	G11 / E751 – Koper	Kaštel border crossing to Slovenia northern end of E751 concurrency
	1.2	0.75	D510 / E751 – Plovanija border crossing, A9 motorway	southern end of E751 concurrency
Buje	6.4	4.0	Ž5007 – Šterna, Oprtalj, Karojba	
Buje	6.6	4.1	D200 / Ž5008 – Plovanija border crossing, Grožnjan	
Buje	6.9	4.3	D300 – Umag	
Ponte Portone	18.0	11.2	D44 / D301 – Buzet, Novigrad	
Vižinada	24.0	14.9	Ž5041 – Brnobići	
	29.6	18.4	Ž5042 – Višnjan, Karojba	
Baderna	38.7	24.0	D48 / D302 – Pazin, Poreč	Grade separated
Medaki interchange	45.6	28.3	A9 / E751	Grade separated
	47.4	29.5	Ž5002 – Vrsar	
	52.9	32.9	D303 – Rovinj	Grade separated
	58.6	36.4	Ž5098 – Krmed, Svetvinčenat	
Bale	61.5	38.2	Ž5096 – Rovinj	
Vodnjan sjever (north) interchange	69.7	43.3	A9 / E751	Via a connector road
Vodnjan	71.7	44.6	Ž5190 – Fažana	
Vodnjan	72.6	45.1	Ž5192 – Svetvinčenat, Žminj	
Vodnjan jug (south) interchange	73.1	45.4	A9 / E751	Via a connector road
	75.2	46.7	Ž5117 – Galižana	
	79.4	49.3	Ž5115 – Fažana, Barbariga, Brijuni National Park	
Pula	80.1	49.8	D400 – Pula Airport, Pula Ferry Port	Southern terminus of the road
1.000 mi = 1.609 km; 1.000 km = 0.621 mi: Concurrency terminus

Sources: Public roads classification and Regulation on motorway markings in Croatia
