= Mirna Bridge =

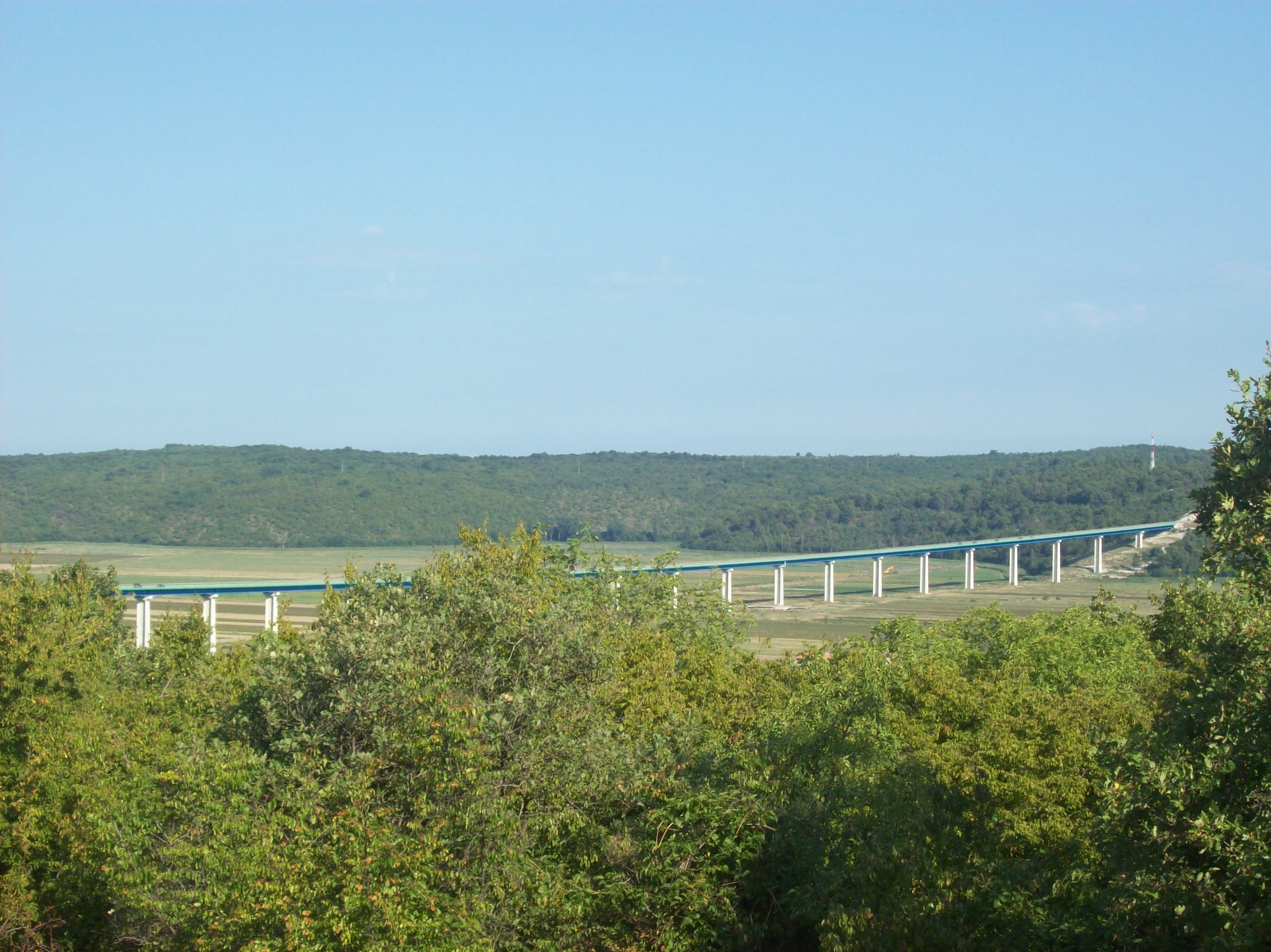
- Coordinates: 45.329461°N 13.626652°E
- Carries: 2 lanes of A9 motorway
- Crosses: Mirna River
- Locale: Istria, Croatia
- Official name: Most Mirna
- Maintained by: BINA Istra

Characteristics
- Design: Girder bridge
- Total length: 1,378 m
- Width: 10.1 m
- Longest span: 70.1 m

History
- Opened: 2005

Statistics
- Toll: yes

The Mirna Bridge is located between the Nova Vas and Višnjan interchanges of the A9 motorway in Istria, Croatia, spanning the Mirna River and the wide Mirna River valley. It is 1,378 metres (4,521 ft) long and comprises two traffic lanes. The bridge has been open for traffic since June 2005. The bridge is one of the most significant structures on the motorway. The bridge was designed by Zlatko Šavor.

The A9 route between Umag and Kanfanar, where the Mirna Bridge is located, was upgraded to motorway standards in June 2011. However, the works did not include construction of a parallel structure across the Mirna River which would carry the additional carriageway. Expansion of the bridge to a full motorway is planned to start in 2013 and be completed by 2015.

== Description ==
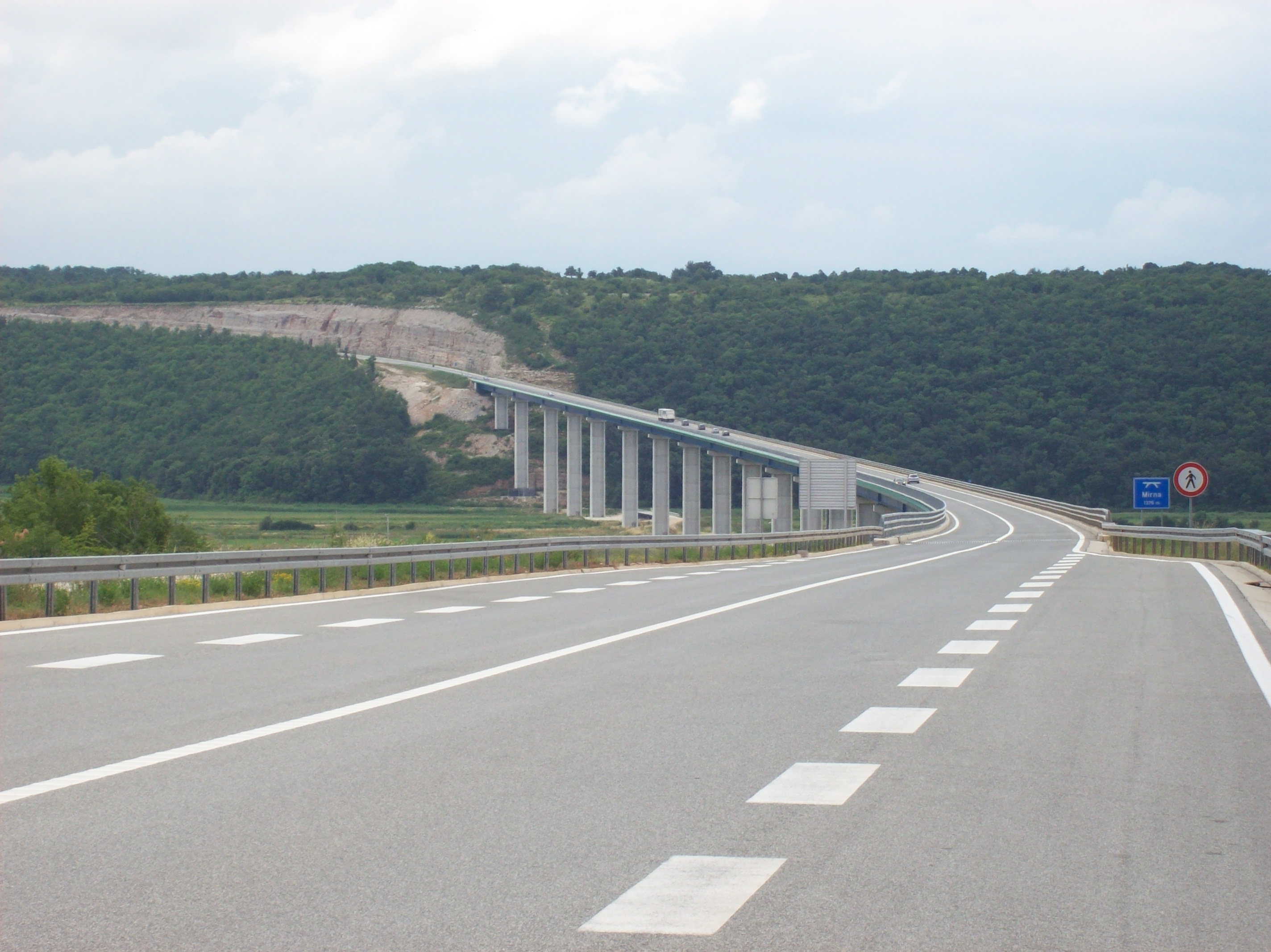
A view of the Mirna Bridge from the A9 motorway

The deck structure stretches across 22 spans: 51.07 m (167.6 ft) + 15 x 66.5 m (218 ft) + 70.1 m (230 ft) + 2 x 50.01 m (164.1 ft) + 61.1 m (200 ft) + 42.6 m (140 ft) + 30.5 m (100 ft).

The design of the bridge was initially in 66.5-metre (218 ft) spans, but the final layout was imposed by the particular soil conditions and the arrangement of the river bed and canals below the bridge. Since the soil supporting the bridge foundations has exceptionally low load carrying capacity, it was important to reduce weight of the structure as much as possible. Therefore, the design employs two weight-reducing elements: longitudinal steel girders and piers with cap beams at varying heights. The latter reduces volume of concrete used for construction of the piers thereby reducing weight of the structure while giving the bridge a curved, concave deck.

The design of the pier foundations was further affected by the fact that the valley is a high quality agricultural area that had to be preserved as much as possible. The height of the reinforced concrete piers ranges from 13.45 metres (44.1 ft) to 40.03 metres (131.3 ft) and each of the piers is topped by a cap beam. The piers comprise an I-cross section with the webs aligned with the bridge axis. Peripheral piers (P1, P2, P20, P21) are executed on shallow foundations, while the remaining piers are executed on driven piles. The superstructure consists of two longitudinal prefabricated girders of constant depth set 550 centimetres (220 in) apart made composite with the deck slab and cross-girders. Structurally, the superstructure is a 1,354.86-metre (4,445.1 ft) long continuous girder across 22 spans, tracing a horizontal and a vertical curve. The cross section of the superstructure consists of two solid I-section steel girders of constant depth.

== Traffic volume ==
Traffic is regularly counted and reported by BINA Istra, the operator of the bridge and the A9 motorway where the bridge is located, and published by Hrvatske ceste. Substantial variations between annual (AADT) and summer (ASDT) traffic volumes are attributed to the fact that the bridge carries much tourist traffic to the Istrian Adriatic resorts. The traffic count is performed using analysis of motorway toll ticket sales.

Mirna Bridge traffic volume
| Road | Counting site | AADT | ASDT | Notes |
| A9 | 2722 Mirna toll plaza | 4,659 | 10,821 | Between Nova Vas and Višnjan interchanges; from 2009. |

== See also ==
- List of bridges by length
- A9 motorway
