= D200 road =

Road in Croatia

D200 state road

Route information
- Length: 7.6 km (4.7 mi)

Major junctions
- From: Slovenian G111 at Plovanija border crossing
- A9 motorway near Umag interchange D510 to Kaštel border crossing (to Slovenia)
- To: D21 in Buje

Location
- Country: Croatia
- Counties: Istria
- Major cities: Plovanija, Buje

Highway system
- Highways in Croatia

D200 is a state road connecting Plovanija border crossing and Buje, as well as A9 motorway Umag interchange via Ž5002 county road. The road is 7.6 km long.

The road also provides a connection to Kaštel border crossing via D510 and D21 state roads.

The road, as well as all other state roads in Croatia, is managed and maintained by Hrvatske ceste, state owned company.

== Traffic volume ==
Traffic is regularly counted and reported by Hrvatske ceste, operator of the road. Substantial variations between annual (AADT) and summer (ASDT) traffic volumes are attributed to the fact that the road connects Plovanija border crossing to Slovenia and A9 motorway carrying substantial tourist traffic to Istria, a major touristic destination.

D200 traffic volume
Road	Counting site	AADT	ASDT	Notes
D200	2701 Plovanija	6,267	14,978	Between Plovanija border crossing and D510 junction.

== Road junctions and populated areas ==
D200 junctions/populated areas
Type	Slip roads/Notes
	Plovanija border crossing to Slovenia. Slovenian G11 road. Northern terminus of the road.
	A9 to Poreč and Pula. D510 to Kaštel border crossing (to Slovenia).
	Plovanija - a junction with Ž5002, which in turn serves as a connecting road to A9 motorway (Umag interchange).
	Kladanija
	L50007 to Gamboci.
	Buje: D21 to Kaštel border crossing (to the north) and to D300 state road and Kanfanar (to the south). Southern terminus of the road.
