= D48 road (Croatia) =

Road in Croatia

D48 state road

Route information
- Length: 19.1 km (11.9 mi)

Major junctions
- From: D21 and D302 near Baderna
- D64 just outside Pazin
- To: A8 in Rogovići interchange

Location
- Country: Croatia
- Counties: Istria
- Major cities: Pazin

Highway system
- Highways in Croatia

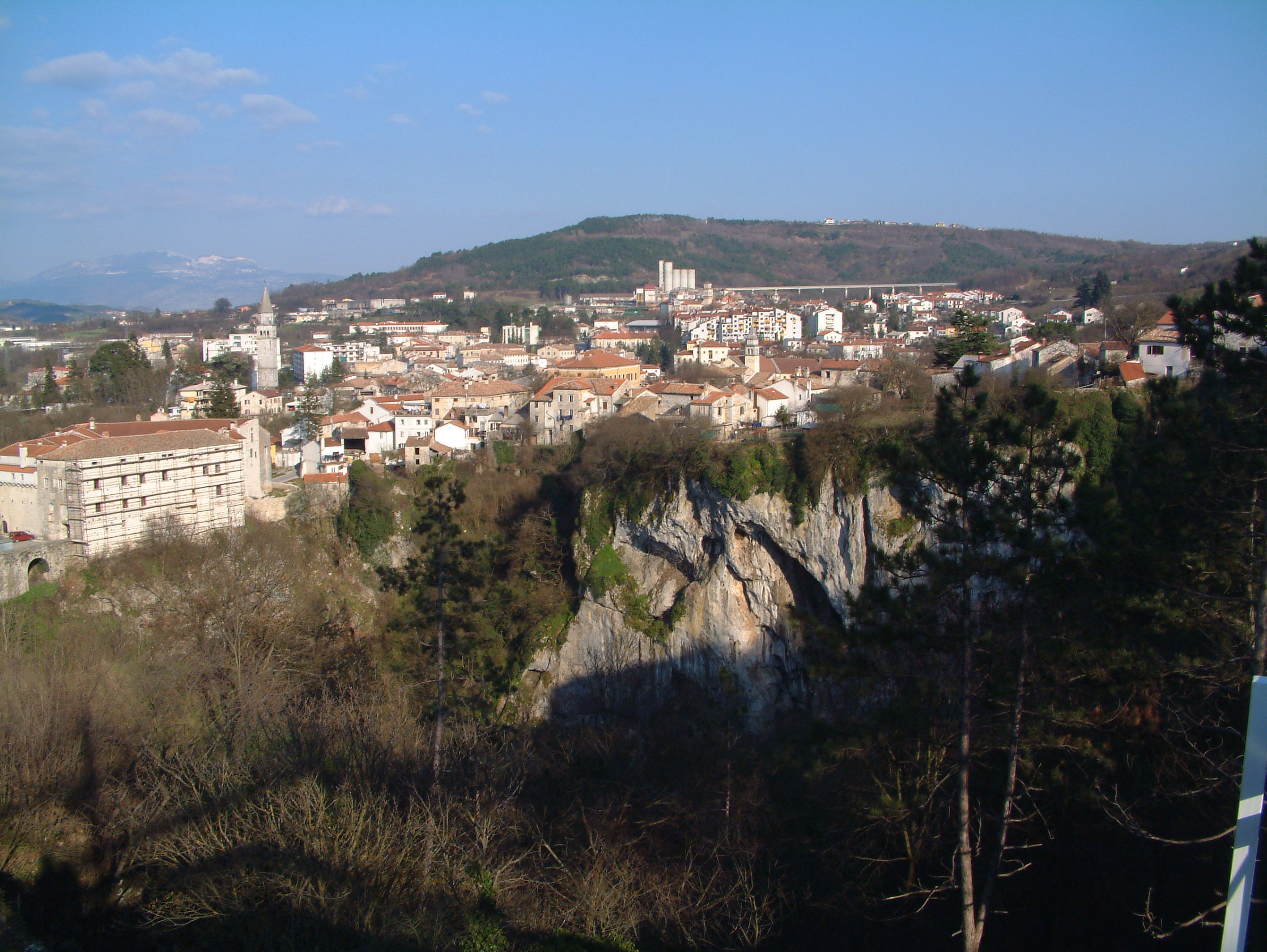
Pazin, at the eastern terminus of D48

D48 is a state road connecting the city of Pazin with D21 and D302 state roads near Baderna, the latter serving as a connecting road to A9/B9 expressway.

The D48 road thus serves as a connection between the two arms of Istrian Y and towns in the centre of Istria peninsula, including Pazin, Baderna and Žminj. The road is 19.1 km (11.9 mi) long.

The road, as well as all other state roads in Croatia, is managed and maintained by Hrvatske ceste, a state-owned company.

== Traffic volume ==
Traffic is regularly counted and reported by Hrvatske ceste, operator of the road. Substantial variations between annual (AADT) and summer (ASDT) traffic volumes are attributed to the fact that the road connects two arms of Istrian Y carrying substantial tourist traffic.

D48 traffic volume
Road	Counting site	AADT	ASDT	Notes
D48	2712 Tinjan	3,235	5,088	The only published traffic counting site on D48.

== Road junctions and populated areas ==
D48 major junctions/populated areas
Type	Slip roads/Notes
	A8 motorway in Rogovići interchange to Kanfanar, Pula, Rovinj and Poreč (to the west) and Rijeka (to the east). Ž5190 to Žminj and Svetvinčenat. Eastbound D48 traffic defaults to Ž5190. The eastern terminus of the road.
	L50190 to Pazin.
	D64 to Pazin.
	Ž5007 to Karojba and Oprtalj.
	Tinjan; Ž5075 to Sveti Petar u Šumi.
	Jakovići
	D21 to Buje and Pula. D302 to A9/B9 expressway in Baderna interchange and to Poreč. Westbound D48 traffic defaults to D302. The western terminus of the road.
