= D301 road =

Road in Croatia

D301 state road

Route information
- Length: 17.0 km (10.6 mi)

Major junctions
- From: D21 junction at Ponte Porton
- A9 in Nova Vas interchange
- To: Novigrad

Location
- Country: Croatia
- Counties: Istria

Highway system
- Highways in Croatia

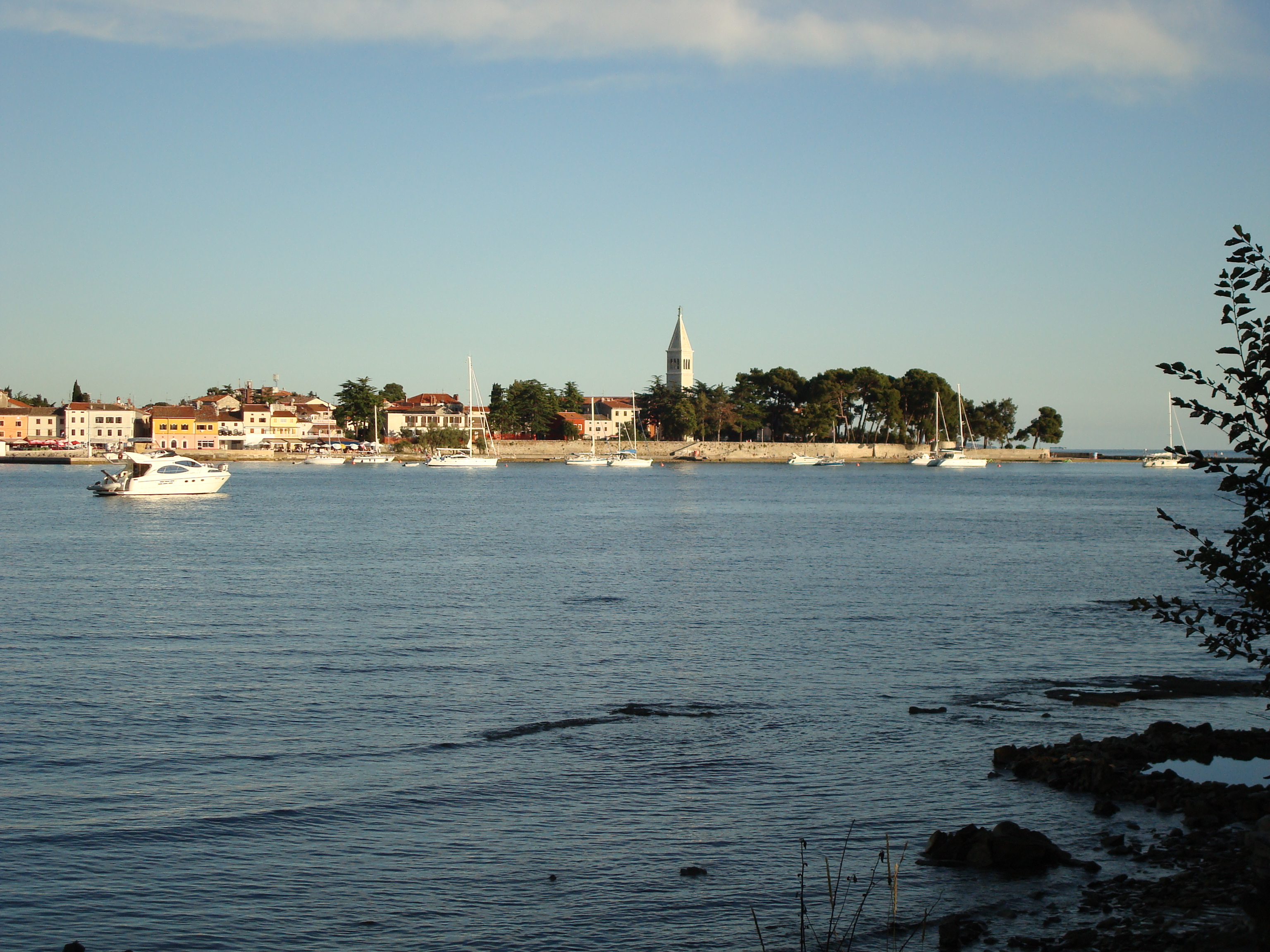
Novigrad, at the western terminus of D301

D301 is a state road connecting A9 with Novigrad and D21 state road. The road is 17.0 km long.

The road, as well as all other state roads in Croatia, is managed and maintained by Hrvatske ceste, a state owned company.

== Traffic volume ==
Traffic is regularly counted and reported by Hrvatske ceste, operator of the road. Substantial variations between annual (AADT) and summer (ASDT) traffic volumes are attributed to the fact that the road connects A9 motorway carrying substantial tourist traffic to Novigrad, a major summer resort.

D301 traffic volume
Road	Counting site	AADT	ASDT	Notes
D301	2720 Bužanija south	5,316	9,140	The only published traffic counting site on D301.

== Road junctions and populated areas ==
D301 junctions/populated areas
Type	Slip roads/Notes
	D21 to Krasica and Buje. Eastern terminus of the road.
	Nova Vas: L50042 to Brtonigla; L50043 to Mirna Valley
	Nova Vas interchange: A9 motorway to Pula (to the south) and to Umag (to the north).
	Ž5070 to Brtonigla
	Bužinija
	Novigrad: Ž5002 to Antenal and Tar-Vabriga to the south and Dajla and Umag to the north Western terminus of the road.

== See also ==
- Istrian Y
