= D303 road =

State road in Croatia

D303 state road

Route information
- Length: 13.5 km (8.4 mi)

Major junctions
- From: A9 and A8 in Kanfanar interchange
- D21 near Kanfanar interchange
- To: Rovinj

Location
- Country: Croatia
- Counties: Istria
- Major cities: Rovinj

Highway system
- Highways in Croatia

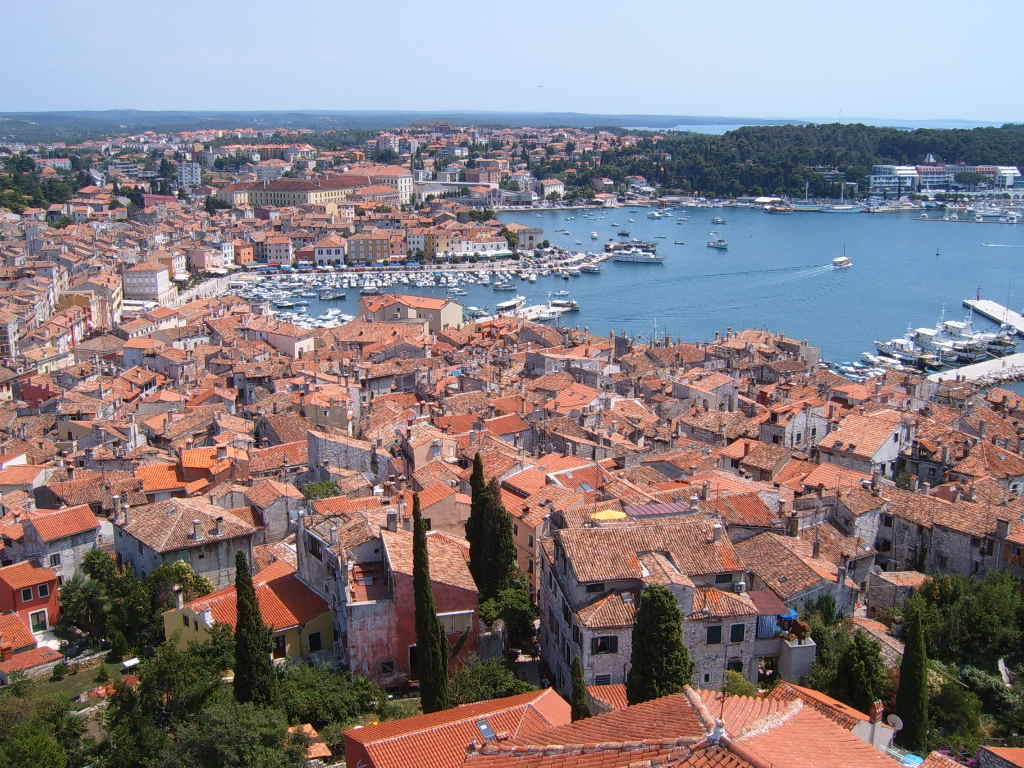
Rovinj, at the western terminus of D303

D303 is a state road connecting A9 and A8 motorways (Kanfanar interchange) to Rovinj. The road is 13.5 km long.

The road, as well as all other state roads in Croatia, is managed and maintained by Hrvatske ceste, state owned company.

== Traffic volume ==
Traffic is regularly counted and reported by Hrvatske ceste, operator of the road. Substantial variations between annual (AADT) and summer (ASDT) traffic volumes are attributed to the fact that the road connects A9 motorway carrying substantial tourist traffic to Rovinj, a major summer resort.

D303 traffic volume
Road	Counting site	AADT	ASDT	Notes
D303	2716 Sošići	6,741	13,187	The only published traffic counting site on D303.

== Road junctions and populated areas ==
D303 junctions/populated areas
Type	Slip roads/Notes
	Kanfanar interchange: A9 motorway to Pula (to the south) and to Umag (to the north); A8 to Rijeka; Ž5077 to Kanfanar; The eastern terminus of the road. Eastbound D303 traffic defaults to the Ž5077.
	D21 to Bale.
	L50128 to Bubani
	Putini
	Rovinjsko Selo
	Rovinj; Ž5095 to Valalta resort Ž5096 to Bale; The western terminus of the road.

== See also ==
- Istrian Y
