= D400 road =

Road in Croatia

D400 state road

Route information
- Length: 1.6 km (0.99 mi)

Major junctions
- From: D66 west of A9/B9 Pula interchange
- D21 in Pula
- To: Pula ferry port

Location
- Country: Croatia
- Counties: Istria
- Major cities: Pula

Highway system
- Highways in Croatia

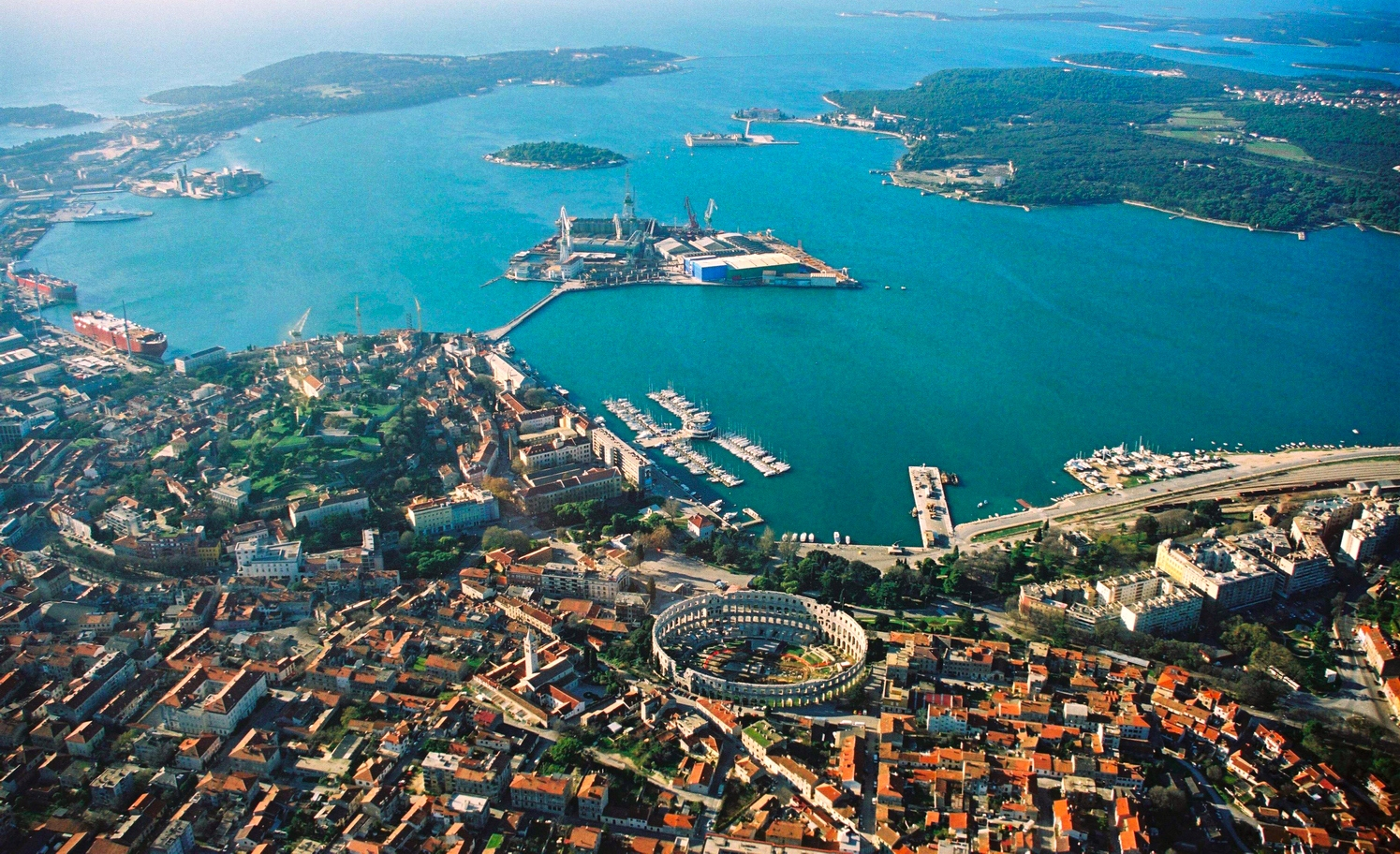
Pula, at the western terminus of D400

D400 is a state road connecting D66 and D21 state roads to Pula city centre and Pula ferry port. The road is only 1.6 km (0.99 mi) long. Urban planning documents of the city of Pula indicate that the two-lane road may be expanded to four traffic lanes.

Like all other state roads in Croatia, the D400 is managed and maintained by Hrvatske ceste, a state-owned company.

== Traffic volume ==
There are no official published data on volume of traffic carried by the D400 road, however, the volume may be inferred from traffic volumes on the southernmost traffic counting sites of the state roads terminating at the D400 route, namely D21 and D66. Additionally the road carries an unspecified volume of urban traffic of the city of Pula, therefore it may be safely concluded that average annual daily traffic (AADT) and average summer daily traffic (ASDT) of the D400 road exceed 15,000 and 20,000 vehicles per day respectively.

D400 volume of traffic
Road	Counting site	AADT	ASDT	Notes
D21	3905 Pula north	7,136	9,464	The southernmost traffic counting site on D21, effectively counting traffic between D21 and D400.
D66	3904 Loborika	6,229	8,345	The southernmost traffic counting site on D66, effectively counting traffic between D66 and D400.

== Road junctions and populated areas ==
D400 junctions/populated areas
Type	Slip roads/Notes
	D66 to Pula Airport, A9/B9 expressway Pula interchange and Labin. The eastern terminus of the road.
	Pula; D21 to Bale.
	Pula ferry port. The western terminus of the road.
