= D510 road =

Road in Croatia

D510 state road

Route information
- Part of
- Length: 3 km (1.9 mi)

Major junctions
- From: A9 in Umag interchange
- D200 in Plovanija
- To: Kaštel border crossing to Slovenia

Location
- Country: Croatia
- Counties: Istria

Highway system
- Highways in Croatia

D510 is a state road connecting the A9 motorway at the Umag interchange and D200 road to the Kaštel border crossing with Slovenia. The road is 3 km (1.9 miles) long. The section of road between the Umag interchange with A9 motorway and the roundabout with D200 road is a single-carriageway, two-lane expressway.

The road, as well as all other state roads in Croatia, is managed and maintained by Hrvatske ceste, a state-owned company.

== Road junctions and populated areas ==
D510 junctions
Type	Slip roads/Notes
	Umag interchange: A9 to Poreč and Pula (to the south). D75 to Umag (to the east) and Plovanija (to the west). The western terminus of the road.
	D200 to Plovanija border crossing (to Slovenia, to the north) and to Buje (to the south). Eastern terminus of two-lane expressway.
	Ž5220 to Kaštel and Buje (to the south).
	Kaštel border crossing to Slovenia. Eastern terminus of the road.
