= BINA Istra =

Bina-Istra d.o.o.
- Company type: Joint-stock company
- Industry: Transport
- Founded: 1995
- Headquarters: Pula, Croatia
- Key people: Dario Silić (CEO); Francois Jean Paul Tcheng (Chairman of the board)
- Products: Istrian Y motorway operator
- Revenue: ▼944,443,000 HRK (2021)
- Net income: ▲-52,773,000 HRK (2021)
- Owner: BINA Fincom (67%); Bouygues (16%); Hrvatske autoceste (14.8%); Istarska autocesta (2.2%)
- Number of employees: 223
- Website: www.bina-istra.com

BINA Istra is a Croatian joint stock company founded in 1995 to facilitate construction and subsequent management of an Istrian Y motorway, consisting of the A8 motorway and the A9 motorway. On September 21, 1995, BINA Istra was granted concession regarding management of the Istrian Y. The concession agreement is valid until 15 December 2041, when the motorways shall be returned to the Republic of Croatia without any compensation.

The company manages or develops the following routes:

Number	Control cities (or other appropriate route description)
A8	Kanfanar (A9) - Matulji (A7)
A9	Umag - Kanfanar (A8) - Pula

Current ownership structure of the company is as follows:

- Bina-Finacom d.d (67%)
- Bouygues Travaux Publics S.A. (16%)
- Hrvatske Autoceste d.o.o (14.8%)
- Istarska Autocesta d.o.o. (2.2%)

BINA Fincom d.d., the majority shareholder in the company, has the following ownership structure:

- Bouygues Travaux Publics S.A. (50.7%)
- Hrvatske Autoceste d.o.o. (44%)
- Ina Industrija Nafte d.d. (5%)
- Grenobloise d’Electronique et d’Automatismes (0.3%)

The company is currently managed by Dario Silić (general manager) as well as a supervisory board chaired by Francois Jean Paul Tcheng.

== See also ==
- Highways in Croatia
- Hrvatske ceste
