= Funtana =

Funtana Fontane
- Municipality
- Funtana Municipality; Opcina Funtana - Comune di Fontane
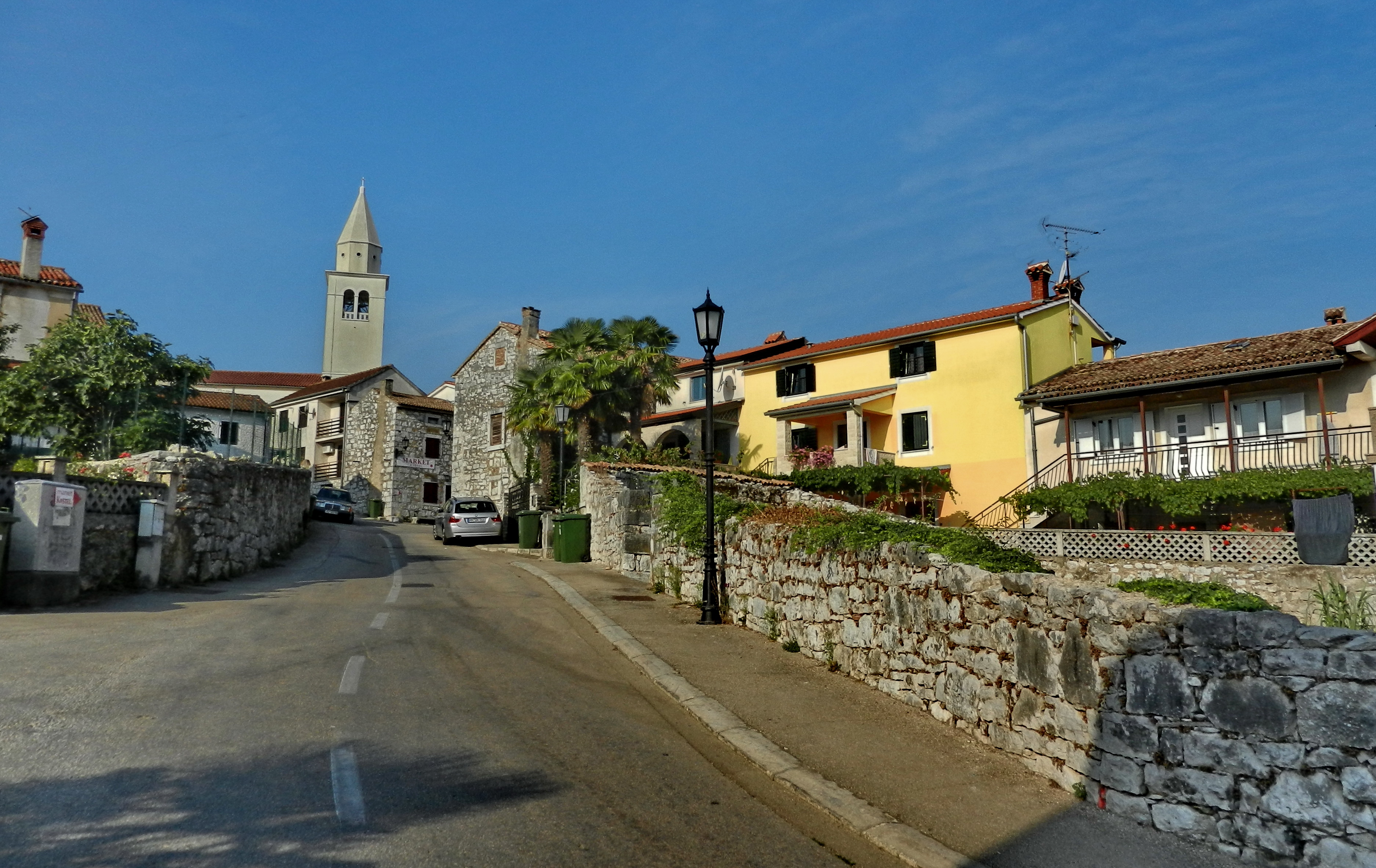

- Flag

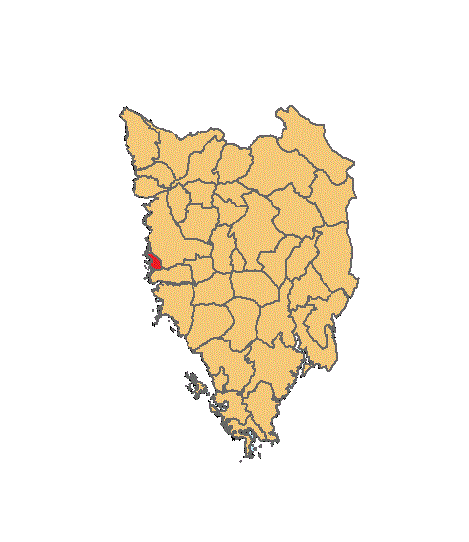
- Location of Funtana municipality in Istria
- Interactive map of Funtana
- Location within Croatia
- Coordinates: 45°10′N 13°36′E
- Country: Croatia
- County: Istria County

Area
  - Municipality: 8.0 km^{2} (3.1 sq mi)
  - Urban: 8.0 km^{2} (3.1 sq mi)

Population (2021)
  - Municipality: 911
  - Density: 110/km^{2} (290/sq mi)
  - Urban: 911
  - Urban density: 110/km^{2} (290/sq mi)
- Time zone: UTC+1 (CET)
  - Summer (DST): UTC+2 (CEST)
- Website: funtana.hr

Funtana (Italian: Fontane) is a village and municipality (2006) in Istria, west Croatia, located between Poreč and Vrsar. This place has been declared the most touristic place on the Adriatic.

== Demographics ==
In 2021, the municipality had 911 residents. Funtana was the only settlement in the municipality.

Funtana: Population trends 1857–2021
v

population	273	301	342	418	518	590	640	752	663	567	480	460	614	671	831	907	911
	1857	1869	1880	1890	1900	1910	1921	1931	1948	1953	1961	1971	1981	1991	2001	2011	2021

Sources: Croatian Bureau of Statistics publications

=== Language ===
Although though the Government of the Republic of Croatia does not guarantee official Croatian-Italian bilingualism, the statute of Funtana itself does. Preserving traditional Italian place names and assigning street names to Italian historical figures is legally mandated, but not carried out.
