= Pomer, Croatia =

Pomer
- Village
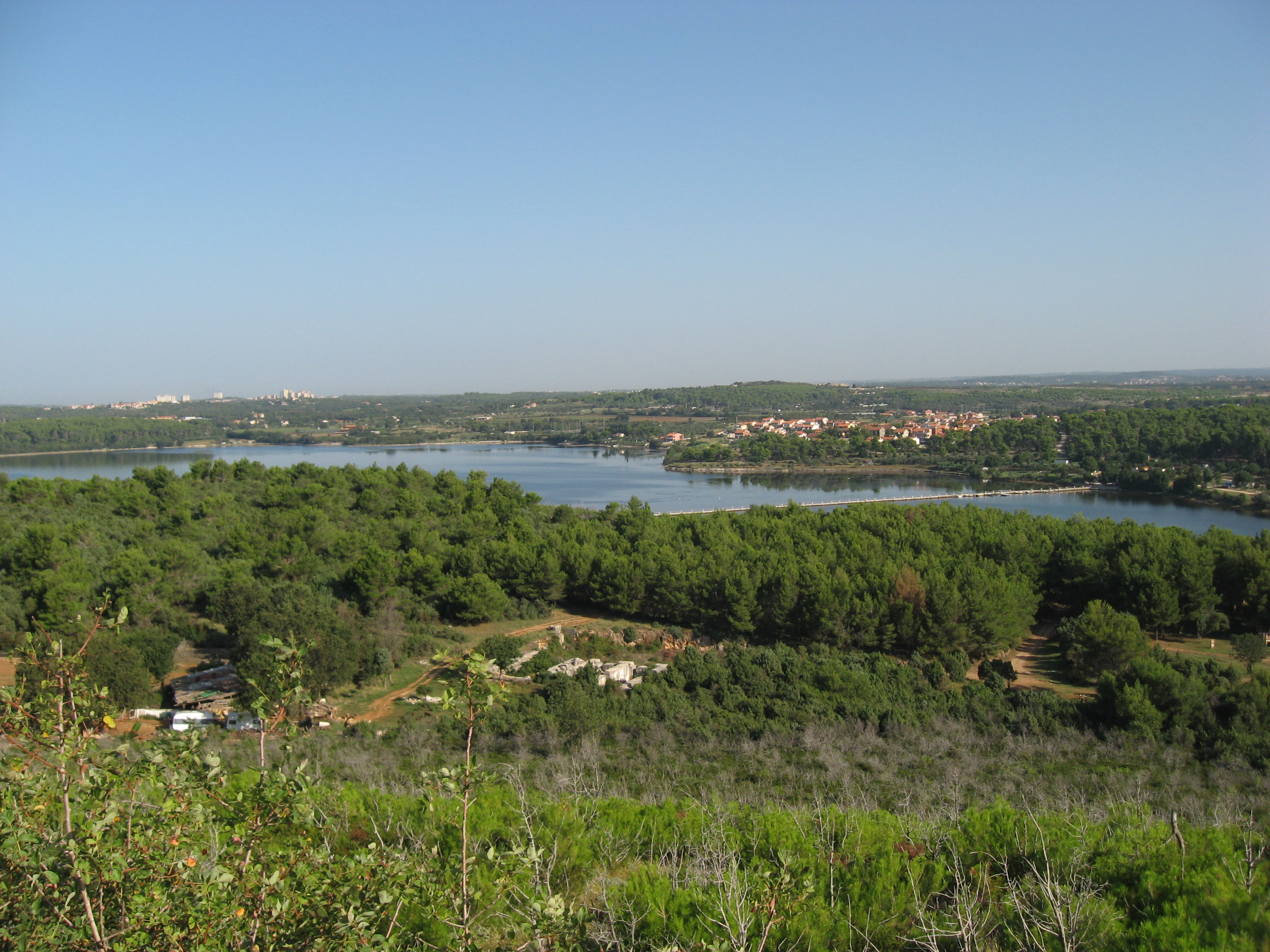

- Location within Croatia
- Coordinates: 44°49′26″N 13°53′46″E
- Country: Croatia
- County: Istria County
- Municipality: Medulin

Area
  - Total: 2.5 sq mi (6.4 km^{2})

Population (2021)
  - Total: 491
  - Density: 200/sq mi (77/km^{2})
- Time zone: UTC+1 (CET)
  - Summer (DST): UTC+2 (CEST)
- Postal code: 52100 Pula
- Area code: 052

Pomer (Italian: Pomer) is a village in the municipality of Medulin-Medolino, in southern Istria in Croatia.

== Demographics ==
According to the 2021 census, its population was 491. In 2001 it had a population of 386.
