= Kanfanar interchange =

Road interchange in Croatia

- Croatian: čvor Kanfanar
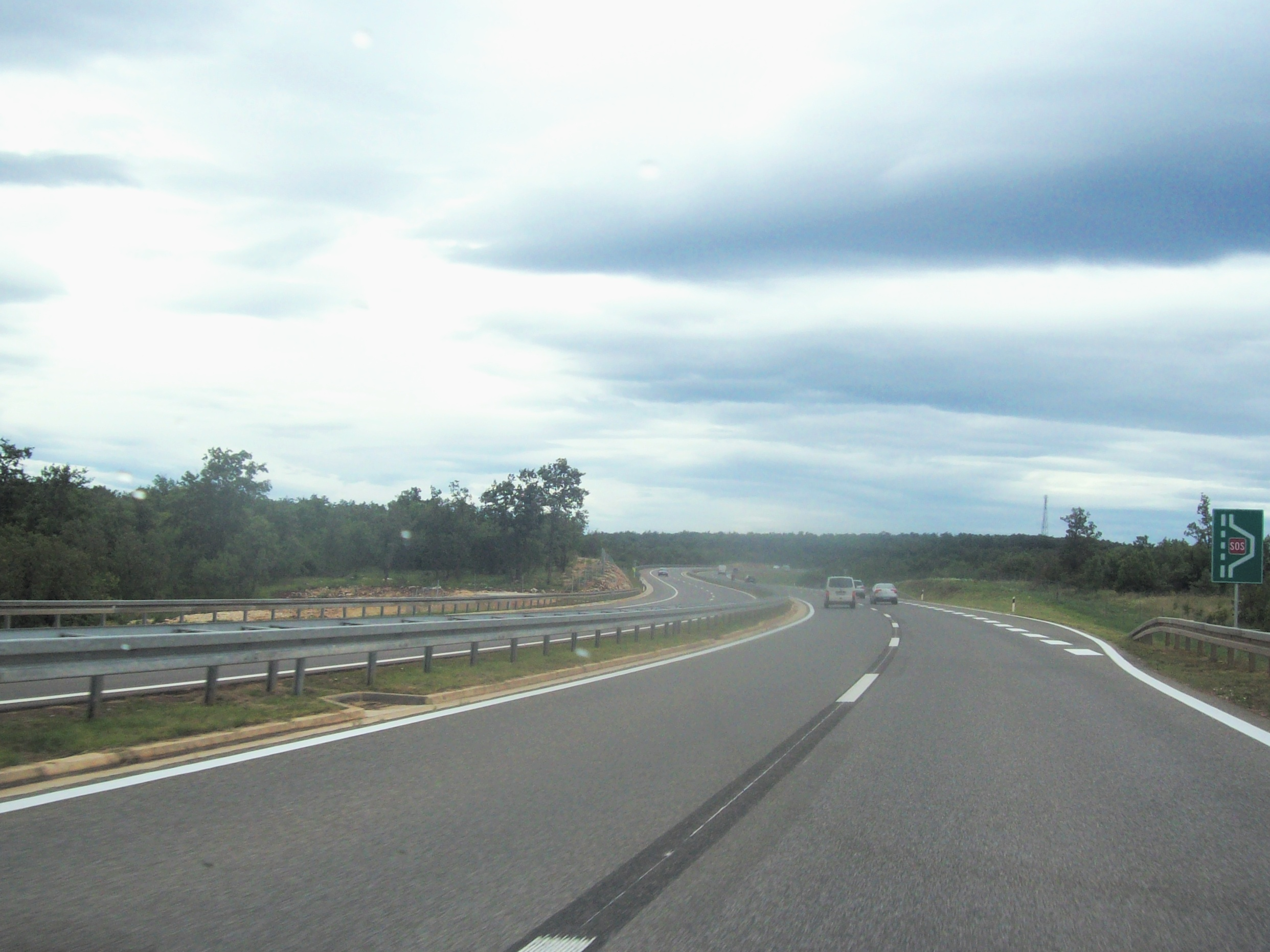
- A9 connecting to the Kanfanar interchange
- Interactive map of Kanfanar interchange

Location
- Kanfanar, Croatia
- Coordinates: 45.112664°N 13.814621°E
- Roads at junction: A8; A9 D303

Construction
- Type: Cloverleaf interchange

The Kanfanar interchange (Croatian: Čvor Kanfanar) is a cloverleaf interchange west of Kanfanar, Croatia. The interchange represents the western terminus of the A8 motorway and it connects the A8 route to the A9 motorway representing major a link in the Croatian motorway system. The interchange represents a junction of three arms of the European route E751.

Construction of the interchange marked start of construction of the A9 motorway in form of an expressway. Its construction started in 1988 and finished in 1991, making it a part of the first section of the Pula–Umag route which was subsequently expanded to comprise six lanes and dual carriageways, connecting the largest tourist resorts in the western Istria to Slovenia.

== See also ==
- International E-road network
- Transport in Croatia
