= Galižana =

Galižana Gallesano
- Village
- Location within Croatia
- Country: Croatia
- County: Istria County
- Municipality: Vodnjan

Area
  - Total: 9.7 sq mi (25.1 km^{2})

Population (2021)
  - Total: 1,620
  - Density: 167/sq mi (64.5/km^{2})
- Time zone: UTC+1 (CET)
  - Summer (DST): UTC+2 (CEST)
- Postal code: 52215 Vodnjan
- Area code: 052

Galižana (Italian: Gallesano) is a village in Istria, Croatia. It is part of the City District of Vodnjan-Dignano, Istria County.

== History ==
During the Roman period, it was the center of the Pula colony where Roman roads intersected.

As early as the 9th century, Galižana was under the administration of the bishops of Pula who owned land and the right to collect tithes.

In the 12th century the name was known as Galisanum, as well as Golisana, and Calisanum. The Latin version of the settlement was Gallicianum.

The Galician parish church (1613) was dedicated to St. Roko (1295–1327).

Stronger economic and cultural development began in the mid-19th century with the construction of the Pula–Trieste railway, which passes through Galižana.

== Demographics ==
According to the 2021 census, its population was 1,620. It was 1,700 in 2011.

According to the 2001 census, the settlement had 1,349 inhabitants and 455 family households.

Its main economy is agriculture (olives) and tourism.
