= Nova Vas, Brtonigla =

Nova Vas Villanova
- Village
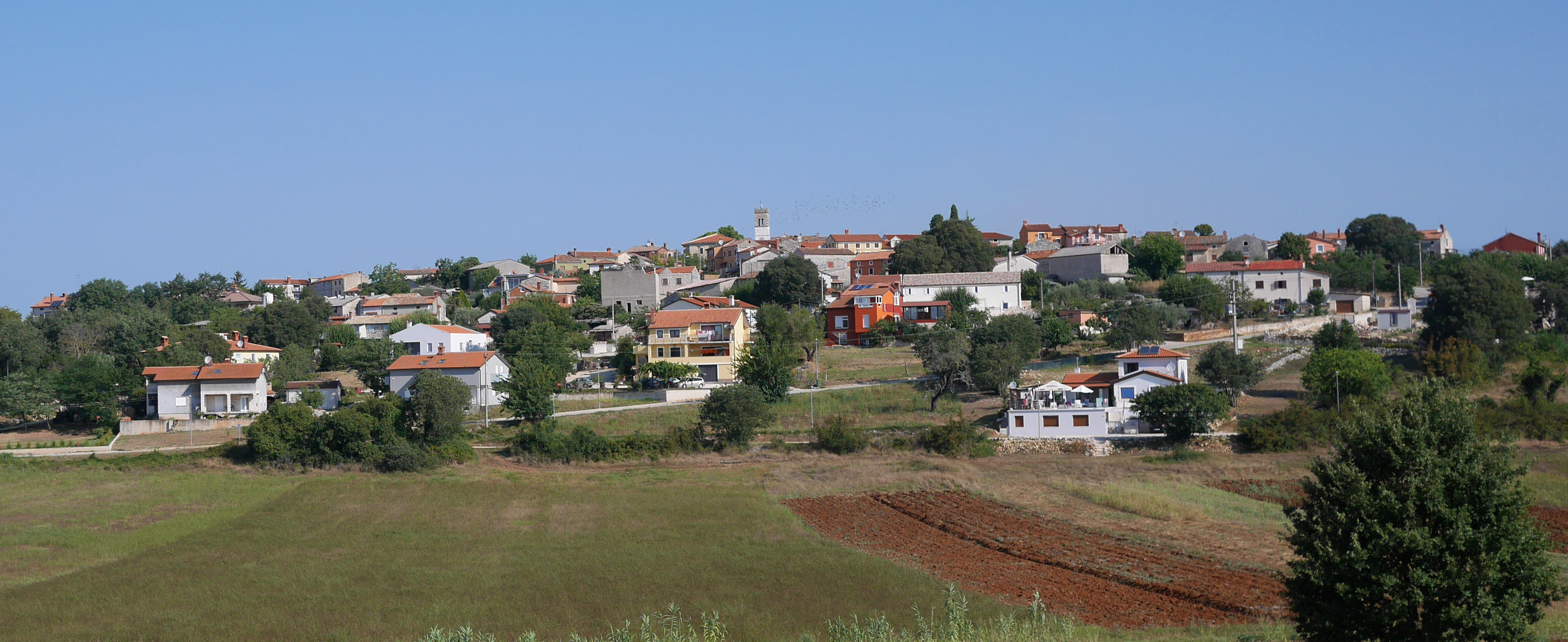

- Location within Croatia
- Country: Croatia
- County: Istria
- Municipality: Brtonigla

Area
  - Total: 4.5 sq mi (11.7 km^{2})

Population (2021)
  - Total: 366
  - Density: 81.0/sq mi (31.3/km^{2})
- Time zone: UTC+1 (CET)
  - Summer (DST): UTC+2 (CEST)
- Postal code: 52474 Brtonigla
- Area code: 052

Nova Vas (Italian: Villanova, Villanova del Quieto) is a village in the Brtonigla-Verteneglio municipality in Istria County, Croatia. It is connected by the D301 highway.

== Demographics ==
According to the 2021 census, its population was 366.
