= Baderna =

Baderna Mompaderno
- Village
- Location within Croatia
- Coordinates: 45.212671°N 13.753166°E
- Country: Croatia
- County: Istria County
- Municipality: Poreč

Area
  - Total: 1.5 sq mi (3.9 km^{2})
- Elevation: 837 ft (255 m)

Population (2021)
  - Total: 316
  - Density: 210/sq mi (81/km^{2})
- Time zone: UTC+1 (CET)
  - Summer (DST): UTC+2 (CEST)
- Postal code: 52445 Baderna
- Area code: 052

Baderna (Italian: Mompaderno) is a village in Istria region of Croatia. The settlement is administered as a part of the City of Poreč/Parenzo and the Istria County.

== Name ==
Historically, it has also been called Monspaternus and Monpaderno.

== History ==
Its parish was founded in 1600 by separation from Sveti Lovreč. Pastoral visitations by the Bishop of Poreč took place in the years: 1601, 1622, 1625, 1634, 1639, 1645, 1649, 1653, 1657, 1663, 1668, 1676, 1683, 1688, 1693, 1697, 1701, 1714, 1720, 1727, 1732, 1739, 1747 and 1781.

== Demographics ==
According to the 2021 census, its population was 316. According to the 2011 census, the village had 240 inhabitants. It is connected by the D21 road.

== Bibliography ==
- Jelinčić, Jakov; Uljančić-Vekić, Elena (2007-02-02). "Popis lokaliteta pastoralnih vizitacija porečkih biskupa u 17. i 18. stoljeću" [List of Locations of Pastoral Visitations of the Bishops of Poreč in the 17th and 18th Century]. Vjesnik istarskog arhiva (in Serbo-Croatian) (8–10): 107–174. ISSN 0353-7153.
