= Kaštel =

Kaštel Castelvenere
- Village
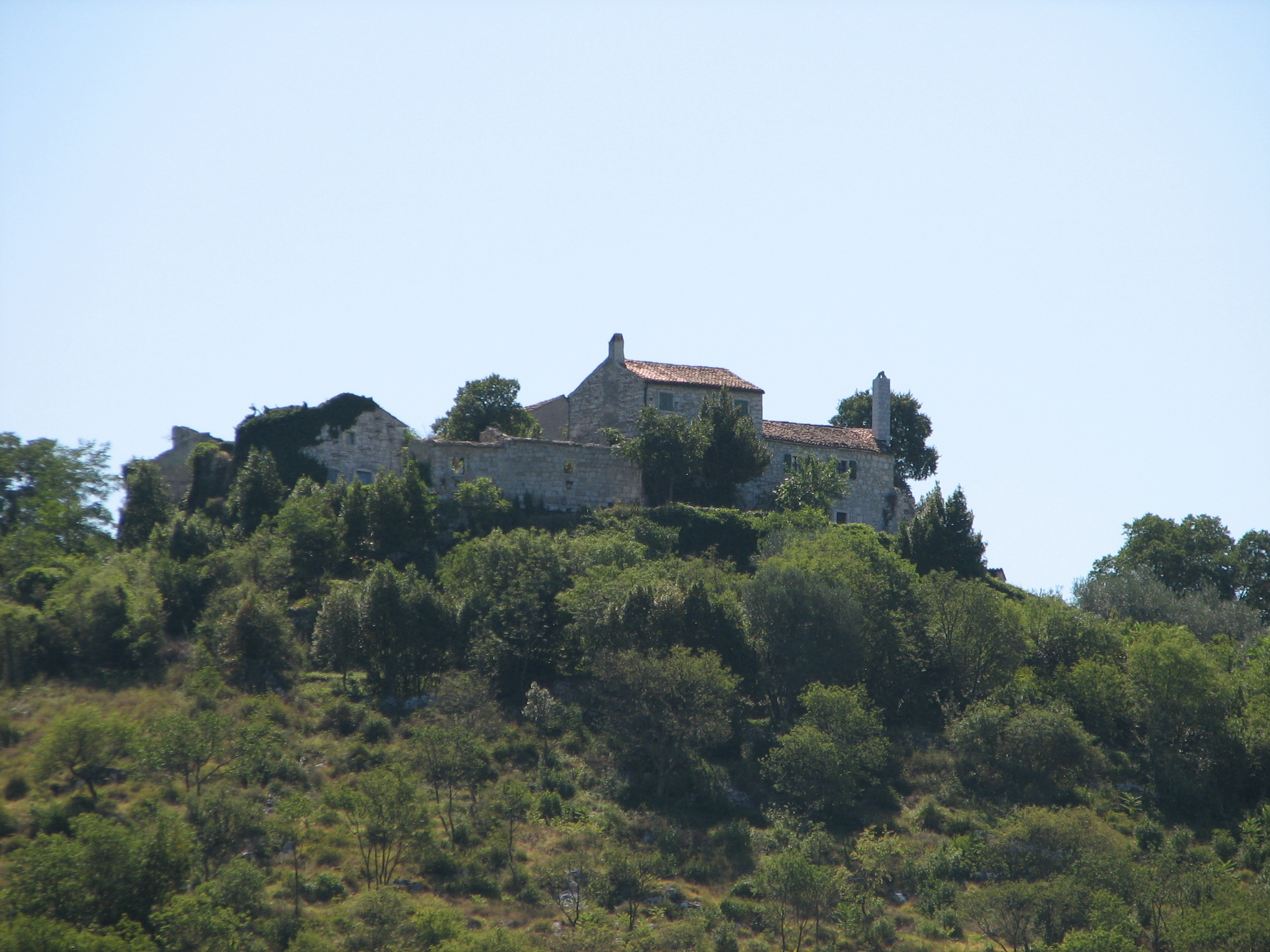

- Location within Croatia
- Coordinates: 45°26′56″N 13°39′26″E
- Country: Croatia
- County: Istria
- Municipality: Buje

Area
  - Total: 3.4 sq mi (8.9 km^{2})

Population (2021)
  - Total: 606
  - Density: 180/sq mi (68/km^{2})
- Time zone: UTC+1 (CET)
  - Summer (DST): UTC+2 (CEST)
- Postal code: 52460 Buje
- Area code: 052

Kaštel (Italian: Castelvenere or Castelvenere di Pirano) is a village in Istria, Croatia, located on the border with Slovenia. It is connected by the D21 highway.

== Demographics ==
According to the 2021 census, its population was 606.
