= A8 (Croatia) =

Toll motorway in Croatia

A8 motorway
- Autocesta A8
- Istarski ipsilon
- in use other motorways

Route information
- Part of
- Length: 64.0 km (39.8 mi)

Major junctions
- From: A9 at the Kanfanar interchange
- D8 near Opatija D44 at the Lupoglav interchange
- To: A7 at the Matulji interchange

Location
- Country: Croatia
- Counties: Primorje-Gorski Kotar, Istria
- Major cities: Pazin, Opatija, Rijeka

Highway system
- Highways in Croatia

The A8 motorway (Croatian: Autocesta A8) is a 64.0-kilometre (39.8 mi) toll motorway in Croatia. It connects the A7 motorway near Rijeka with the road network in the Istrian peninsula via the Učka Tunnel. The road terminates at the Kanfanar interchange with the A9 motorway, which with the A8 motorway forms the Istrian Y road system. The motorway's national significance is reflected in its positive economic impact on the cities and towns it connects, as well as its importance to tourism in Croatia. The importance of the motorway for tourism is particularly high during the summer tourist season, when its traffic volume increases by about 65%.

The construction of the A8 motorway and the Istrian Y can be traced back to 1968 when the Croatian Parliament decided to build a modern road linking Istria with the rest of Croatia. Subsequently, a bond to fund the construction was issued. The construction work started in 1976; in 1981 the Učka Tunnel was finished and a 22.6-kilometre (14.0 mi) section of the route between Matulji and Lupoglav was completed as a single-carriageway, two-lane expressway. The Lupoglav-Cerovlje portion was the next one to be completed, in 1988. The route was extended to the Rogovići interchange between 1992 and 1998, and the remaining section to Kanfanar was completed in 1999 as a two-lane road. In 2011, the expressway route started to be expanded gradually with the addition of a new carriageway and emergency lanes, eventually making most of it a controlled-access highway; the expansion of the route's first section, between Kanfanar and Rogovići, was completed in October 2011. The route's full expansion to motorway standards – including six lanes and grade separation of all its interchanges – is scheduled by 2015, when a second tube for the Učka Tunnel and a new route connecting the tunnel to the A7 motorway are planned. Construction slowed in the 1990s due to a lack of funding; therefore, a build-operate-transfer concession for the Istrian Y was granted to the BINA Istra corporation for a period of 32 years.

All intersections found along the route are grade separated, except for a single at-grade intersection currently regulated by traffic lights; a new route is planned to bypass this intersection. As of June 2021, there were eleven exits and two service areas along the route. The motorway is currently toll-free except for the Učka Tunnel and the Kanfanar-Rogovići section. However, most of the motorway is potentially a toll road using a ticket system, with each exit including a toll plaza except those of Veprinac, Opatija, and Matulji. The toll system of the A8/A9 Istrian Y is integrated: A8 tickets are valid interchangeably on the A9 sections and vice versa, thus obviating the need to stop between the sections.

== Route description ==
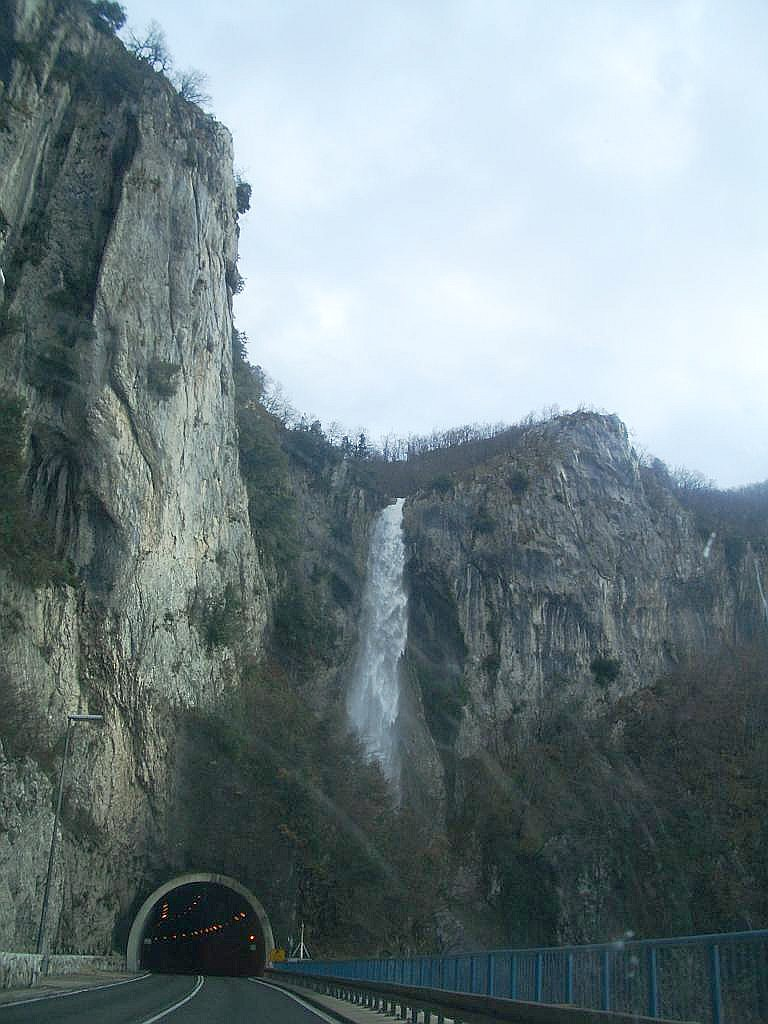
The western portal of the A8's Učka Tunnel

The A8 motorway is an east–west motorway in Croatia, crossing the eastern and central parts of Istria. It connects the Matulji interchange near Rijeka, the largest city on the northern Adriatic coast of Croatia, to Istria via the Kanfanar interchange situated in the area of the city of Rovinj. The motorway represents a link between the A7 and the A9 motorway—spanning between border of Slovenia and the cities of Rijeka and Pula, respectively. This part of the road network of Croatia is also part of European route E751, consisting of the Koper–Kanfanar–Pula and Kanfanar–Rijeka sections. The route is economically important to Croatia, especially for tourism and as a cargo transport route. The road carries significant cargo and tourist traffic as the largest-capacity road link between the Istrian and Kvarner Gulf regions and the nation's capital, Zagreb. Most of the road has a design speed of 100 kilometres per hour (62 mph); the part meeting full motorway standards has a design speed of 120 kilometres per hour (75 mph). The final segment of the route – between the Učka tunnel and the Matulji interchange – has a design speed of 80 kilometres per hour (50 mph) because of the mountainous terrain crossed and proximity of residential structures.

The route originates in the Kanfanar interchange with the A9 motorway and the D303 road in central Istria, east of Rovinj. From that point, the A8 proceeds east towards the Žminj exit; there it turns north towards the Rogovići interchange with the D48 road. The latter represents the western approach to Pazin, the capital of Istria County. The A8 section between Kanfanar and Rogovići consists of four traffic lanes with a central reservation. Beyond the Rogovići interchange, the A8 changes direction once again, running generally to the northeast; it acts as a bypass around Pazin. It goes through rough karst terrain that requires three major bridges with a total length of 949 metres (3,114 ft); the longest bridge is the Drazej viaduct, at 444 metres (1,457 ft). The road then heads toward Cerovlje, running along and near the Pazinčica river valley and the Cerovlje valley; this includes a 1,330-metre (4,360 ft) bridge over the Pazinčica river. After Cerovlje the road runs for 7 kilometres (4.3 mi), through hilly terrain requiring bridges for about 10% of the route, to the Lupoglav exit and an interchange with the D44 road. Past Lupoglav, after going over the Lupoglav–Raša railway line the A8 heads southeast, until it reaches the D500 road at the Vranja exit and the western entrance to the 5.062-kilometre (3.145 mi) Učka Tunnel; this is the third-longest road tunnel in Croatia. The tunnel carries the route east, through part of the Učka mountain range. It represents the end of the easternmost section of the Istrian Y system (comprising the A8 and the A9 motorways) where a toll is charged; consequently, there are toll plazas adjacent to both tunnel entrances. East of the tunnel, the route runs northeast to the Matulji interchange with the A7 motorway and the eastern terminus of the A8 motorway. This section contains the Opatija and Veprinac exits, serving Opatija, Ičići, Lovran and other Opatija Riviera resorts. The elevation of the route's 11.4-kilometre (7.1 mi) segment east of the tunnel drops from 520 metres (1,710 feet) above sea level at the eastern portal of the Učka Tunnel to approximately 180 metres (590 feet) above sea level adjacent to the Matulji interchange. An additional climbing lane is present along parts of this segment. Unlike all the other exits found along the route, the Opatija exit is an at-grade intersection regulated by a traffic light, while the Veprinac exit is executed as a partial cloverleaf interchange. Overall, the A8 is 64.0 kilometres (39.8 miles) long with 10 exits along the route. A significant portion of the route has no emergency lanes as yet, but lay-bys are available intermittently along the route. The traffic lanes' width varies along the route, being 3.5 metres (11 feet) wide in all sections except between Cerovlje and Lupoglav, where the traffic lanes are 3.25 metres (10.7 feet) wide.

The bulk of the route runs through forested areas, especially near the Učka range and near Pazin, with agricultural land in between those areas – most of it located between the Ivoli and Lupoglav interchanges. The final section of the route, near Opatija and the A7 motorway, runs through coastal areas affected by urbanization. The route crosses no major watercourses, although creeks adjacent to or spanned by the route drain into the Pazinčica and Boljunčica rivers, or directly into the Adriatic Sea in the case of watercourses flowing down Učka's eastern slopes. The Učka Tunnel contains a spring discovered during its construction and used for the water supply of Opatija ever since.

The route runs through an area subject to significant air temperature variations. The temperature extremes measured in the area of the route range from −18 to 40 °C (0 to 104 °F), imposing substantial maintenance requirements. The weather patterns prevailing along the route include: an average of three to four days of snow cover, especially in the central parts of Istria; high winds and gales east of the Učka Tunnel, recorded during, respectively, 15 and 54 days per year on average; and fog in the areas west of the Učka mountains and around Pazin, respectively occurring 80 and 50 days per year on average.

An automatic traffic monitoring and guidance system is installed along the motorway. It consists of measuring (of both traffic and weather), control (e.g., variable speed limits), and signalling devices located in zones where driving conditions may vary, such as at the interchanges, viaducts, bridges, and zones where fog or strong wind are known to occur. The system uses variable-message signs to communicate changing driving conditions, possible restrictions, and other information to motorway users. In the Učka Tunnel there are 83 security cameras, 538 fire detectors, 39 fire hydrants, 74 emergency stations, and five vehicle emergency lay-bys; the speed limit is 80 kilometres per hour (50 mph).

== Tolls ==
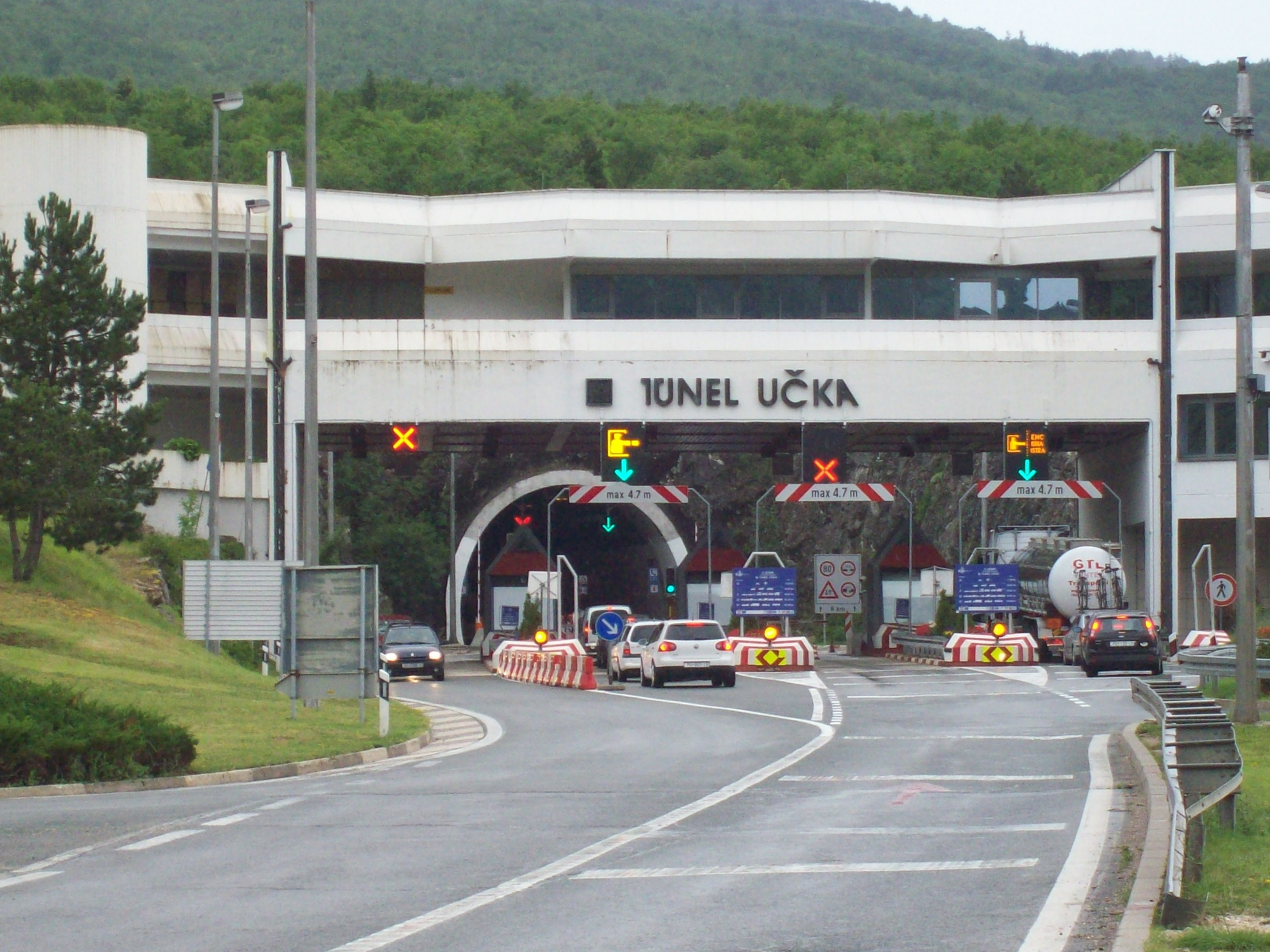
Učka Tunnel western toll plaza

The A8 is a toll road based on the Croatian vehicle classification using a ticket system—charging for use of the motorway based on distance travelled. The system was introduced as a unified toll charge system throughout the Istrian Y motorways in June 2011. Consequently, vehicles using either the A8 or the A9 or switching between the two at the Kanfanar interchange are charged a toll only when they leave the Istrian Y system, no matter where their toll ticket was issued. Along the A8 motorway, a toll is charged only for using the Učka Tunnel and the Kanfanar–Rogovići section; the remaining sections of the motorway are toll-free as of June 2012. Despite this, toll tickets are issued and collected at all exits with toll plazas. For instance, vehicles traveling between Rogovići and Vranja interchanges are issued toll tickets and are required to stop at toll plazas when entering and leaving the A8, but they are not charged for using the route. However, after new sections of the full profile of the highway from Rogovići to Lupoglav and further in direction of new junction Vranja were opened, the toll started to charge also for mentioned sections. The toll charge for travelling the entire length of the motorway ranges from 36.00 kuna (€4.80) for passenger cars to 205.00 kuna (€27.33) for semi-trailer trucks, in 2011 year. In October 2022, the toll charge for the entire A8 motorway ranged from 37.00 kuna (€4.90) for motorcycles, then 62.00 kuna (€8.20) for passenger cars, up to 315.00 kuna (€41.80) for semi-trailer trucks. The toll can be paid in either Croatian kuna or euros using major credit cards, debit cards and several prepaid toll collection systems, including various types of smart cards issued by the motorway operator and ENC; the last is an electronic toll collection system that is shared between all motorways in Croatia except the A2, providing drivers with discounted toll rates and dedicated lanes at toll plazas.

In 2010, BINA Istra (the operator of the motorway) collected €38 million in revenues while its expenditure reached €230 million. In the first half of 2011, however, BINA Istra reported 65.8 million kuna (€8.9 million) of income in the first half of 2011, without VAT. This income represented a 30.8 percent increase compared to the same period in the previous year. (The figure includes income from the entire Istrian Y system, i.e., both the A8 and A9 motorways.) Most of this increase is attributed to the introduction of a closed toll system along the routes, replacing an open toll system in which a toll was charged only at the Mirna Bridge (along the A9 motorway) and the Učka Tunnel. In 1999, the Croatian government negotiated amendments to the BINA Istra concession contract. These amendments allow the government to determine tolls along the A8 and A9 motorways, and the government decided to eliminate tolls on traffic flowing along the two-lane sections of the routes; to compensate for this loss of income, the government subsidizes BINA Istra – for instance, in 2012 it is expected to receive a 165 million kuna (c. €22 million) subsidy. By the end of 2010, the subsidy paid to BINA Istra reached a total of 1.3 billion kuna (c. €173 million); at the time, it was estimated that a further sum of 1.9 billion kuna (c. €253 million) may be paid in annual subsidies between 2011 and 2027, when the concession contract expires. BINA Istra estimates the total investment value of the construction it has carried out or planned on the A8 and A9 routes at one billion euros.

== History ==
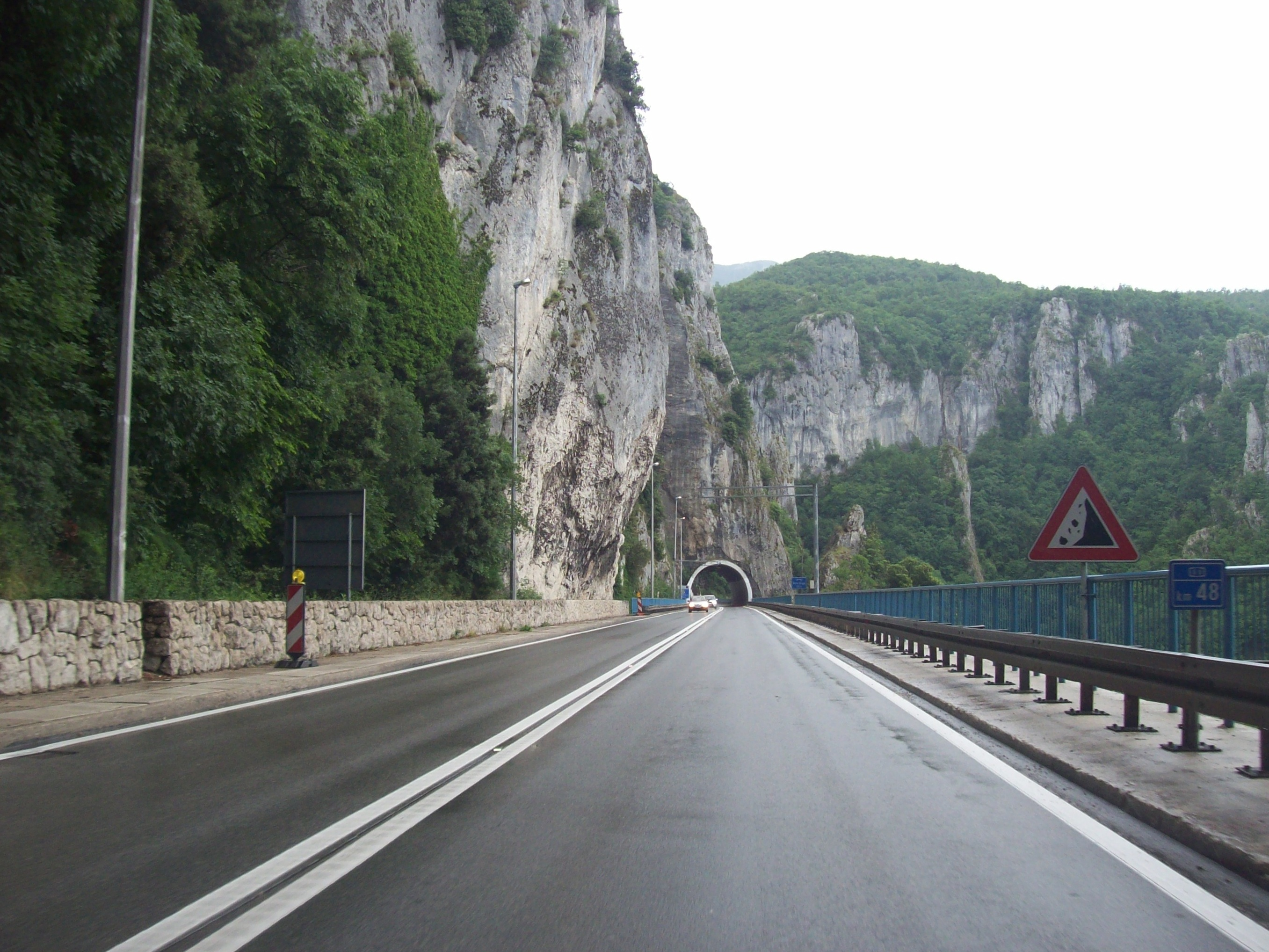
Vela Draga Bridge, the oldest A8 section

The construction of the A8 motorway (and the Istrian Y as a whole) has its origin in 1968, when the Croatian Parliament endorsed a petition by Istrian legislators for the construction of a modern road between the peninsula and the rest of Croatia. Subsequently, Istrian municipalities started a public bond to fund the construction of the Učka Tunnel. This construction happened between 1976 and 1981, including the construction of a 22.6-kilometre (14.0 mi) route section between Matulji and Lupoglav.

The Y shape formed by the A8 and the A9 routes was originally defined by highway planning documents decided upon in Rijeka and Istria, subsequently incorporated in highway planning documents of the Republic of Croatia in 1988. Lupoglav–Cerovlje was the next section to be completed, in 1988. The A8 route was extended to the Rogovići interchange between 1992 and 1998 and the remaining section to Kanfanar was completed in 1999.

As the construction was comparatively slow due to a lack of funding, a motorway concession for the A8 and A9 motorways was granted to BINA Istra for a period of 32 years. The build-operate-transfer concession agreement mandated construction, maintenance and management of the route and its upgrade to motorway standards; this requirement included the building of dual carriageways when the annual average daily traffic (AADT) reached 10,000 vehicles per day or when the average summer daily traffic (ASDT) reached 16,000 vehicles per day. The latter was achieved in 2005 and the motorway upgrade started in 2008, even though the AADT at the time was only 8,500 vehicles. The A8 expansion was commenced by the operator, BINA Istra, immediately following a similar expansion of the A9; on the latter, the entire route was widened except for the two largest bridges, for which the expansion was postponed. The expansion of the A8 was initially limited to the Kanfanar–Rogovići section because the remainder of the route required additional permits and consequently an extended preparation period. On 29 October 2011, the Kanfanar–Rogovići section was upgraded to motorway standards, including four traffic lanes, and the route's designation changed from B8 to A8 (as required by legislated standards). The construction performed along the section entailed deep and long cuts requiring temporary traffic stoppages due to explosive blasting.

The construction of the full profile of the highway from Rogović to the Učka Tunnel started on 15 November 2018, in the length of 28 kilometers, the investment is worth 1.2 billion kuna without VAT. It was very challenging in terms of construction because it requires a large number of overpasses, underpasses and viaducts, as well as the construction of the Rebri rest area, which is necessary for safety reasons, since there is no rest area from the Učka Tunnel to Vodnjan. A total of thirty-one buildings with a length of 2,510 meters were built, twelve viaducts, sixteen underpasses and three overpasses instead of the existing three that will be demolished. In addition, several retaining walls and auxiliary facilities were built, and corrections were made to the route of the existing road at three locations. Due to the complexity of the project, it was divided into three sub-phases: Rogovići – Cerovlje, Cerovlje – Lupoglav and Lupoglav – Vranja, and the Rebri rest area was built separately. The 12-kilometre (7.5 mi) long Rogovići – Cerovlje section was opened to traffic in November 2020, and the 13-kilometre (8.1 mi) long Cerovlje – Lupoglav and Lupoglav – Vranja section in July 2021. The construction site created about a thousand new jobs, and 90 percent of the work was performed by Croatian companies. Therefore, this project at the time of construction had an impact on GDP growth of 0.5 percent.

== Upgrade ==
The road, especially the Učka Tunnel, is undergoing (as of 2023) and due to further undergo, extensive upgrade & refurbishment works.

== Traffic volume ==
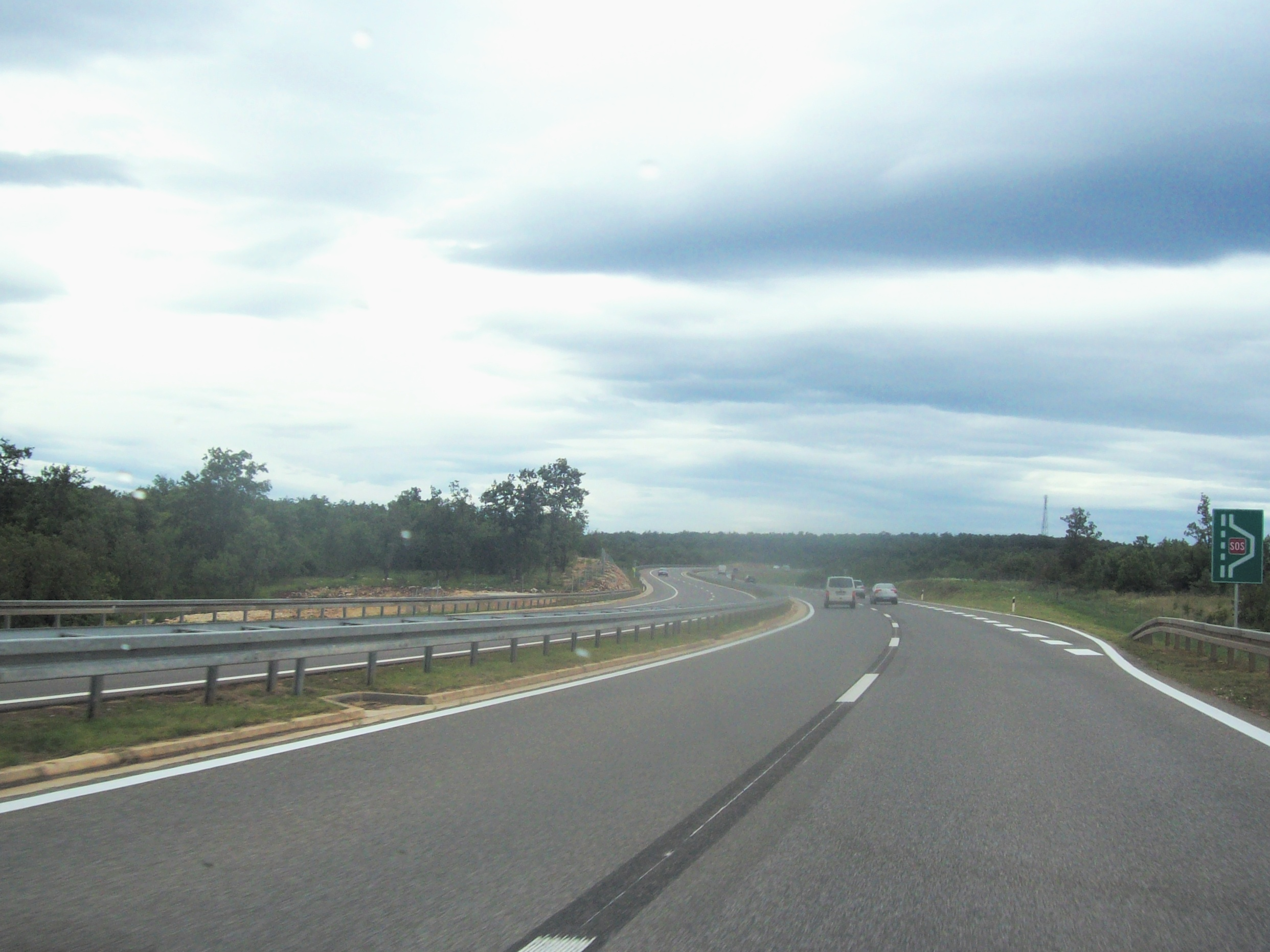
Much of the route has lay-bys instead of emergency lanes

Traffic levels are regularly determined and reported by BINA Istra, operator of the motorway, and published by Hrvatske ceste. In 2010 the traffic volume was only measured in two sections: in the Učka Tunnel and between Lupoglav and Cerovlje. In 2011, traffic counting was started in each section of the A8 between Kanfanar interchange and the Učka Tunnel using the toll ticket counts. As of June 2012, only the ASDT figures for 2011 have been published. The largest AADT volume was recorded in the Učka Tunnel; it represents the only high-performance link between Istria and the rest of the Croatian motorway network.

The differences between the AADT and ASDT traffic volumes in 2010 are attributed to the motorway's carriage of substantial tourist traffic to the Adriatic Sea resorts along the Istrian peninsula. On average, the A8 motorway's ASDT is at least 65% more than the AADT. The largest increase of the ASDT relative to the AADT, 68%, is observed in the Veprinac–Vranja section (which includes the Učka Tunnel). During the summer of 2007, an ASDT of 14,000 was observed in the tunnel, prompting BINA Istra to consider preparing to construct the second tunnel tube. BINA Istra expects the motorways it manages to carry more than 20,000 vehicles per day during the peak tourist season periods.

A8 Traffic Volume Details
Counting Site	Site Map #	AADT (2011)	ASDT (2011)	Between Junctions
Kanfanar east	2741	5,520	8,127	Kanfanar and Žminj
Žminj east	2743	5,410	7,937	Žminj and Rogovići
Rogovići east	2745	6,618	9,405	Rogovići and Ivoli
Ivoli east	2824	7,482	10,267	Ivoli and Cerovlje
Cerovlje east	2826	7,314	10,082	Cerovlje and Lupoglav
Lupoglav east	2828	8,046	10,555	Lupoglav and Vranja
Vranja east	2830	7,795	11,109	Vranja and Veprinac
Source: Hrvatske ceste

== Exit list ==
County	km	Mile	Exit	Interchange Name	Destinations	Notes
Istria	0.0	0.0	1	Rovinj	A9 south – Pula, Brijuni; A9 north – Umag, Poreč, Slovenia, Italy, Austria D303 – Rovinj, Kanfanar E751	Junction with the A9 motorway, which goes (northbound) to Koper, Slovenia and Trieste, Italy. Kanfanar is reached via the D303 connecting to Ž5077. The western terminus of the concurrency with European route E751; that route continues with the A9 motorway The western terminus of the motorway
Istria	6.0	3.7	2	Žminj	Ž5077 – Labin, Barban, Žminj, Sveti Petar u Šumi, Svetvinčenat	The Ž5077 connects to the D66 in Barban.
Istria	16.8	10.4	3	Pazin zapad	D48 – Poreč, western Pazin (including Rogovići), Motovun, Beram Ž5190 – Žminj, Vodnjan	The D48 connects to the D64 state road to Labin.
Istria	22.7	14.1	4	Pazin istok	Ž5046 – Ivoli, eastern Pazin	The Ž5046 connects to the D64 state road in Pazin.
Istria	27.8	17.3	5	Cerovlje	Ž5046 – Cerovlje, Boljun	
Istria	36.2	22.5	Rebri service area			
Istria	40.3	25.0	6	Buzet	D44 – Trieste (Italy), Buzet, Lupoglav	
Istria	46.7	29.0	7	Labin	D500 – Vranja, Labin, Boljun, Rabac, Brestova Ž5047 – Učka Nature Park	The D500 also connects to Šušnjevica, Kršan and further on to the D64 and D66 state roads. Brestova is the ferry port for service to Cres.
Istria	46.8	29.1	Tunel Učka western toll plaza, at which only eastbound traffic pays a toll			
Istria; Primorje‑Gorski Kotar	49.3	30.6	Tunel Učka			
Primorje‑Gorski Kotar	52.6	32.7	Tunel Učka eastern toll plaza, at which only westbound traffic pays a toll			
Primorje‑Gorski Kotar	52.7	32.7	Kvarner service area			
Primorje‑Gorski Kotar	52.7	32.7	N/A	N/A	Vojak	These local destinations are unmarked and unnumbered, as the roads are unsuitable for general public usage.
Primorje‑Gorski Kotar	52.7	32.7	N/A	N/A	Dobreć	These local destinations are unmarked and unnumbered, as the roads are unsuitable for general public usage.
Primorje‑Gorski Kotar	56.2	34.9	8	Veprinac	Ž5048 – Veprinac, Ičići, Opatija	Connects to the D66 state road in Ičići. No toll plaza is present.
Primorje‑Gorski Kotar	59.5	36.9	9	Anđeli	Ž5048 – Šimetići, Kolavići	Connects to the hamlets of Šimetići and Kolavići and Ž5048 road to Veprinac. No toll plaza is present.
Primorje‑Gorski Kotar	62.7	39.0	Matulji service area			
Primorje‑Gorski Kotar	63.3	39.3	11	Opatija - Matulji	D8 – Opatija, Matulji	Connects to western Rijeka and the D66 in Matulji. This exit is the only one that is not grade separated; it is an at-grade intersection, regulated by a traffic light. No toll plaza is present.
Primorje‑Gorski Kotar	64.0	39.8	12	Učka	A7 south – Rijeka, Zagreb, Split; A7 north – Ljubljana, Trieste (Italy) E61 E751	The eastern terminus of the concurrency with European route E751; The eastern terminus of the motorway No toll plaza is present.
Concurrency terminus • Closed/former • Incomplete access • Unopened

== Service areas ==
As of February 2026, there were three service areas along the A8 route, plus one which was removed.

Croatian legislation identifies four types of service areas designated "A" through "D": Type A service areas have a full range of amenities, including a filling station, a restaurant and a hotel or motel; Type B service areas lack lodgings but are otherwise identical to Type A; Type C service areas, which are very common, include a filling station and a café (with waiters serving beverages, sandwiches, and snacks, but not full meals), but no restaurants or accommodations; and Type D service areas only offer parking spaces, restrooms, and possibly picnicking tables and benches (with an additional Type D1 also having a seasonal eating establishment). The service area filling stations frequently have small convenience stores, and some of them offer LPG fuel.

BINA Istra, the primary operator of the route, leases the type A, B, and C service areas to various operators through public tenders. As of September 2011, INA was the rest-area operator on the A8 and the A9 motorways. The service area operators are not permitted to sublease the fuel operations, but can sublease other parts of the service areas. The A8's service areas are accessible from both sides of the motorway and operate 24 hours a day, 7 days a week.

A8 Motorway Service Areas
County	km	Mile	Name	Operators	Type	Notes
Istria	36.2	22.5	Rebri	INA	C	Facility at include parking area, filling station, and small children's play area. This is a single service area accessible from both directions, although the traffic directions are isolated through the design using barriers and bollards.
Istria	46.6	29.0	Vranja			The service area at Vranja, integrated into interchange 7, was removed during the construction of the second tunnel tube.
Primorje-Gorski Kotar	52.7	32.7	Kvarner	INA	C	Facilities include parking area, filling station, and small children's play area. This is a single service area accessible from both directions. As of 2025, it is still incomplete, but the filling station is open for use.
Primorje-Gorski Kotar	62.7	39.0	Matulji	BINA Istra	D1	Facilities at the Matulji service area include a café and parking areas.

== See also ==
- International E-road network
- Transport in Croatia
