= Dolenja vas =

Dolenja Vas, which translates as lowest-lying village from Serbo-Croatian, can refer to the following locations:

In Croatia:

- Dolenja Vas, Croatia, a village near Lupoglav, Croatia

In Slovenia:

- Dolenja Vas, Cerknica, a settlement in the Municipality of Cerknica
- Dolenja Vas, Divača, a settlement in the Municipality of Divača
- Dolenja Vas, Novo Mesto, a settlement in the Municipality of Novo Mesto
- Dolenja Vas, Podbrezje, a former settlement in the Municipality of Naklo
- Dolenja Vas, Prebold, a settlement in the Municipality of Prebold
- Dolenja Vas, Ribnica, a settlement in the Municipality of Ribnica
- Dolenja Vas, Zagorje ob Savi, a settlement in the Municipality of Zagorje ob Savi
- Dolenja Vas, Železniki, a settlement in the Municipality of Železniki
- Dolenja Vas pri Artičah, a settlement in the Municipality of Brežice
- Dolenja Vas pri Čatežu, a settlement in the Municipality of Trebnje
- Dolenja Vas pri Črnomlju, a settlement in the Municipality of Črnomelj
- Dolenja Vas pri Krškem, a settlement in the Municipality of Krško
- Dolenja Vas pri Mirni Peči, a settlement in the Municipality of Mirna Peč
- Dolenja Vas pri Polhovem Gradcu, a settlement in the Municipality of Dobrova–Polhov Gradec
- Dolenja Vas pri Polici, a settlement in the Municipality of Grosuplje
- Dolenja Vas pri Raki, a settlement in the Municipality of Krško
- Dolenja Vas pri Temenici, a settlement in the Municipality of Ivančna Gorica
