= Lupoglav, Istria County =

Lupoglav Lupogliano
- Municipality
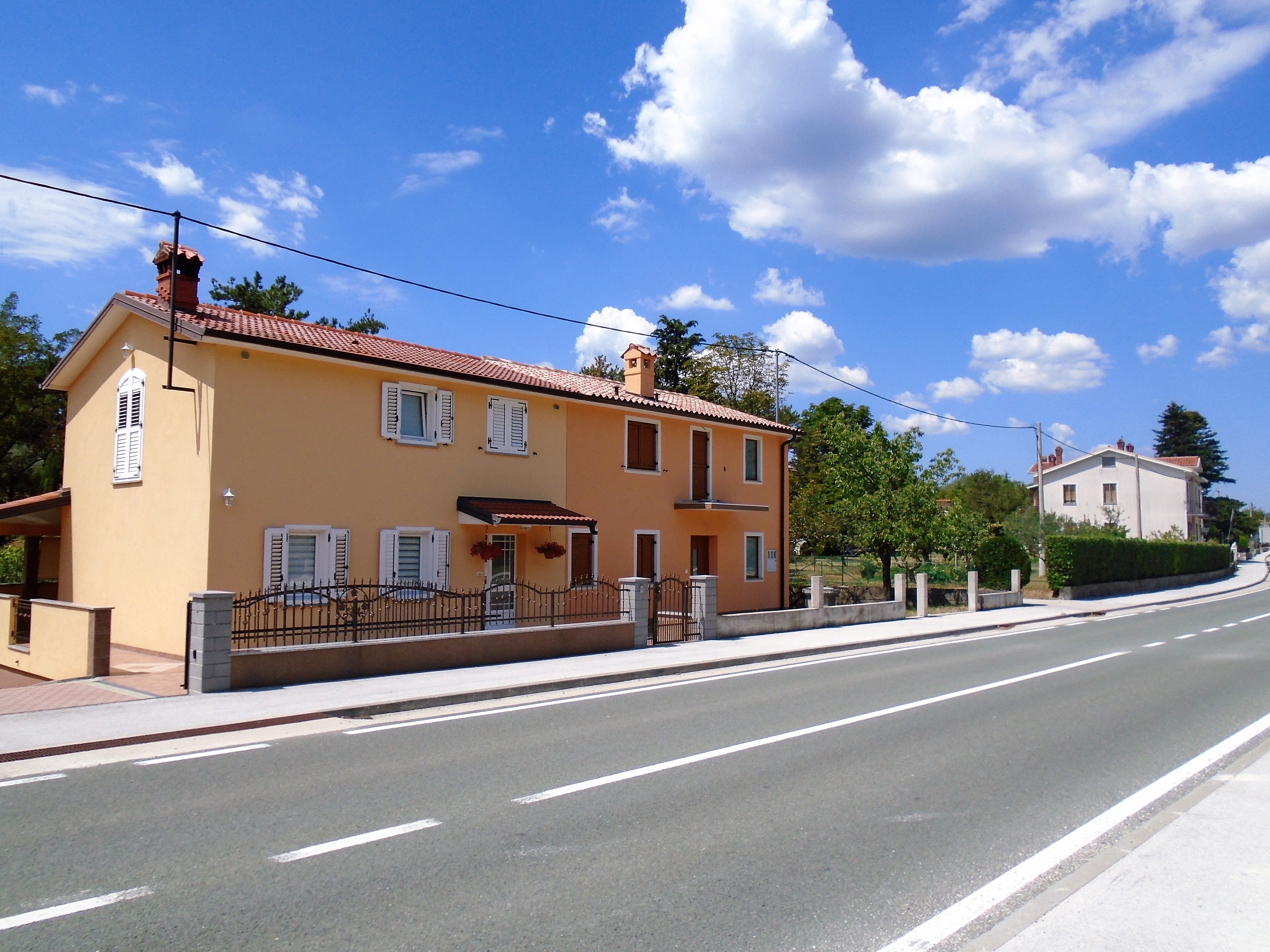
- Main arterial road in Lupoglav

- Location of Lupoglav municipality in Istria
- Interactive map of Lupoglav
- Location within Croatia
- Coordinates: 45°21′47″N 14°06′14″E
- Country: Croatia
- County: Istria County

Government
  - Mayor: Frankec Baxa

Area
  - Municipality: 35.4 sq mi (91.6 km^{2})
  - Urban: 3.6 sq mi (9.4 km^{2})

Population (2021)
  - Municipality: 836
  - Density: 23.6/sq mi (9.13/km^{2})
  - Urban: 298
  - Urban density: 82/sq mi (32/km^{2})
- Time zone: UTC+1 (CET)
  - Summer (DST): UTC+2 (CEST)
- Postal code: 52420 Buzet
- Area code: 052
- Website: lupoglav.hr

Lupoglav (Italian: Lupogliano) is a municipality and village in Istria, Croatia.

The Lupoglav Municipality is situated on the northeast of the Istrian Region. To the east it borders with the Primorsko-Goranska County and with the Istrian municipalities of Lanišće and Cerovlje and the City of Buzet. The municipality is crossed by the arterial roads that connect the Istrian region with the rest of Croatia – the Istrian Y and the tunnel of Učka. The municipality has a surface area of 92.19 km^{2}, i.e. it accounts for 3.27% of the territory of the Istrian Region.

The Castle Mahrenfels which belonged to the family Herberstein and later to the counts Brigido is situated over the village.

== Demographics ==
According to the 2021 census, its population was 836, with 298 living in the village proper. The village population was 288 in 2011, with a total of 924 in the municipality (2011).

The municipality consists of the following settlements:

- Boljun, population 64
- Boljunsko Polje, population 143
- Brest pod Učkom, population 47
- Dolenja Vas, population 48
- Lesišćina, population 75
- Lupoglav, population 298
- Semić, population 69
- Vranja, population 92
Lupoglav: Population trends 1857–2021
v

population	2224	2299	2454	2547	2502	2683	2743	2545	2107	2483	1782	1357	1111	979	929	924	836
	1857	1869	1880	1890	1900	1910	1921	1931	1948	1953	1961	1971	1981	1991	2001	2011	2021

Sources: Croatian Bureau of Statistics publications
