= Podskrajnik =

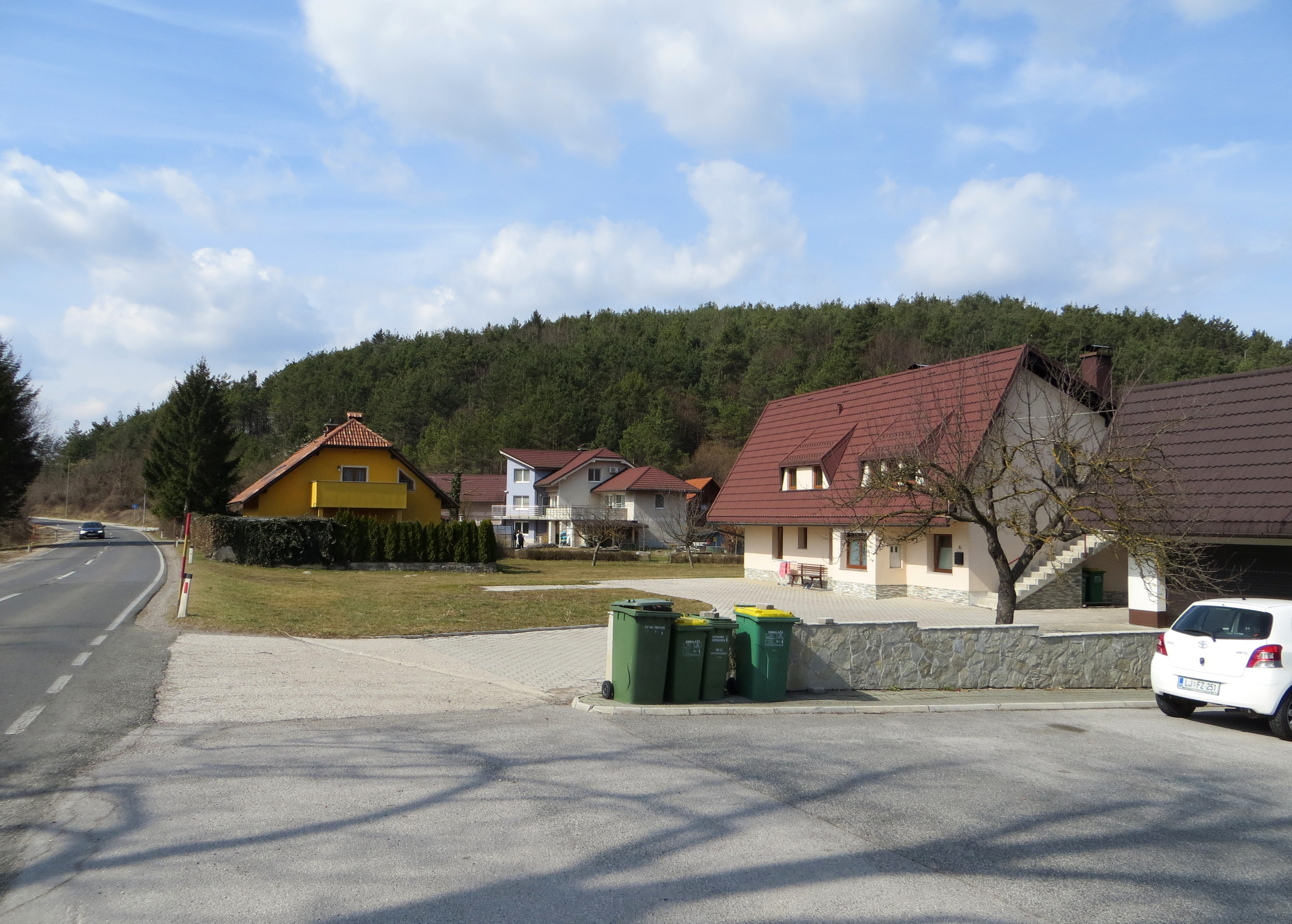

- Location in Slovenia
- Coordinates: 45°47′43.07″N 14°20′30.36″E
- Country: Slovenia
- Traditional region: Inner Carniola
- Statistical region: Littoral–Inner Carniola
- Municipality: Cerknica

Area
  - Total: 0.94 km^{2} (0.36 sq mi)
- Elevation: 560.2 m (1,838 ft)

Population (2020)
  - Total: 90
  - Density: 96/km^{2} (250/sq mi)

Podskrajnik (pronounced [pɔtˈskɾaːi̯nik]) is a settlement on the western outskirts of Cerknica in the Inner Carniola region of Slovenia.

== Geography ==
Podskrajnik lies along the road between Rakek and Cerknica. It lies below the south slope of the Skrajnik Ridge (elevation 652 meters or 2,139 feet). The soil in the area is gravelly and rocky, and it is damp in the area known as Na Brodcu to the south, where the water table lies just below the surface.

== Name ==
The name Podskrajnik is a fused prepositional phrase that has lost case inflection, from pod 'below' + Skrajnik, referring to the Skrajnik Ridge.

== History ==
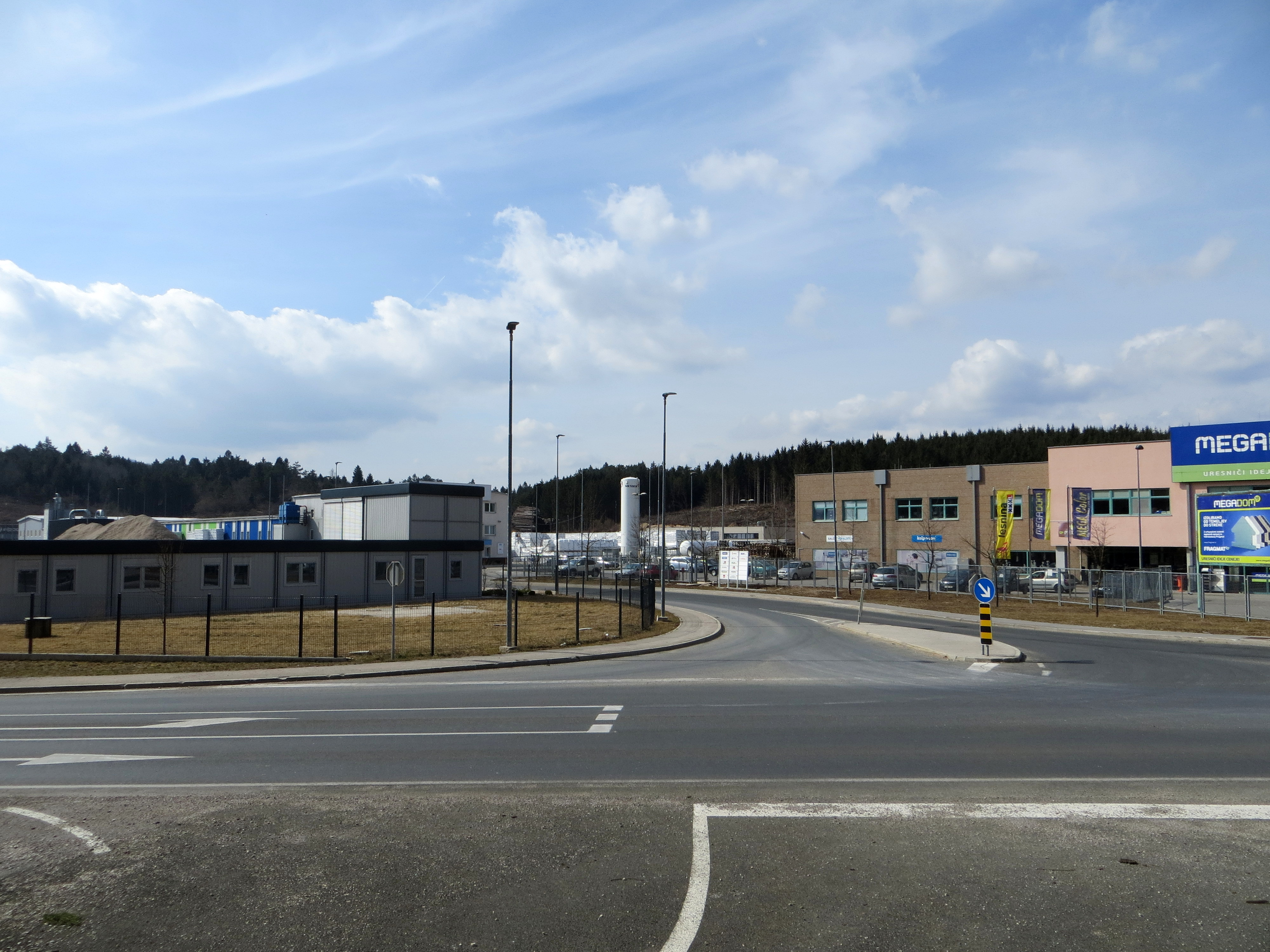
The Krive Doli site in Podskrajnik

The village arose in the mid-19th century in the vicinity of three springs. Villagers from neighboring Zelše also walked to Podskrajnik to draw water until water mains were installed in Zelše in 1911, and during droughts water was also drawn from the Cerkniščica River in nearby Dolenja Vas. A pump and a water tower were installed west of the village in 1854; the tower was dismantled in 1938, but is recalled by the microtoponym Pri Turnu (literally, 'at the tower') at the site.

The Gornik Brickworks operated at Na Brodcu until the First World War, employing workers from Friuli. There are several gravel pits in Podskrajnik, which were used to supply a local industry manufacturing concrete products.

After the Second World War, there was a military installation immediately northwest of Podskrajnik at a site called Krive Doli. The area has been developed into a retail center today. During the immediate postwar years, the site was used by the Yugoslav secret police (OZNA) to liquidate political opponents.
