= Putini =

Putini may refer to:

- Putini, a village near Răchitoasa, Romania
- Putini, Croatia, a village near Kanfanar in Istria
