= Marići =

Marići may refer to:

- Marići, Sveta Nedelja, a village in Istria, Croatia
- Marići, Kanfanar, a village in Istria, Croatia

== See also ==
- Marić, surname that is the likely eponym
