= Semic =

Semic may refer to:

- Semic Comics, a French comic book publisher
- Semic Press, a Swedish publishing company
- Semič, a settlement in southeastern Slovenia
- Semić, a village in the municipality of Lupoglav, in Istria County, Croatia
- Semantic Interoperability Centre Europe (SEMIC.EU)
