= Kanfanar =

Kanfanar Canfanaro
- Municipality
- Flag

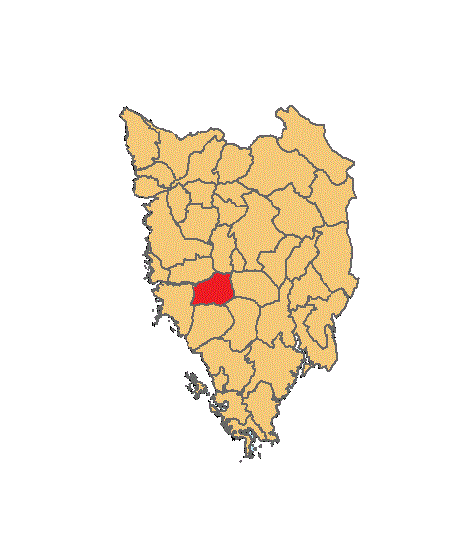
- Location of Kanfanar municipality in Istria
- Interactive map of Kanfanar
- Location within Croatia
- Coordinates: 45°07′N 13°50′E
- Country: Croatia
- County: Istria County

Government
  - Mayor: Sandro Jurman

Area
  - Municipality: 23.1 sq mi (59.9 km^{2})
  - Urban: 2.3 sq mi (6.0 km^{2})

Population (2021)
  - Municipality: 1,498
  - Density: 64.8/sq mi (25.0/km^{2})
  - Urban: 485
  - Urban density: 210/sq mi (81/km^{2})
- Time zone: UTC+1 (CET)
  - Summer (DST): UTC+2 (CEST)
- Postal code: 52341 Žminj
- Area code: 052
- Website: kanfanar.hr

Kanfanar (Italian: Canfanaro) is a settlement and a municipality in Istria, Croatia.

Kanfanar lies at the interchange of the Istrian Y motorway A8 and A9, as well as on the Divača – Pula-Pola railway, and was formerly the junction of a branchline to Rovinj-Rovigno. In the 18th century, Kanfanar became a municipal center, and it is known for sacred monuments such as the church of St. Silvester from the 13th century, the church of St. Mary of Lakuć from the 14th century and the church of St. Agate from the 10th century.

== Demographics ==
In 2021, the municipality had 1,498 residents in the following 20 settlements:

- Barat, population 48
- Brajkovići, population 92
- Bubani, population 58
- Burići, population 54
- Červari, population 28
- Dubravci, population 5
- Jural, population 16
- Kanfanar, population 485
- Korenići, population 20
- Kurili, population 43
- Ladići, population 35
- Marići, population 127
- Maružini, population 83
- Matohanci, population 68
- Mrgani, population 27
- Okreti, population 47
- Putini, population 85
- Sošići, population 67
- Šorići, population 85
- Žuntići, population 25
Kanfanar: Population trends 1857–2021
v

| population | 1810 | 1842 | 1992 | 2207 | 2557 | 2958 | 2970 | 3014 | 2595 | 2483 | 2269 | 1943 | 1713 | 1574 | 1457 | 1543 | 1498 |
| | 1857 | 1869 | 1880 | 1890 | 1900 | 1910 | 1921 | 1931 | 1948 | 1953 | 1961 | 1971 | 1981 | 1991 | 2001 | 2011 | 2021 |

Sources: Croatian Bureau of Statistics publications
