= Istrian Y =

- Croatian: Istarski ipsilon
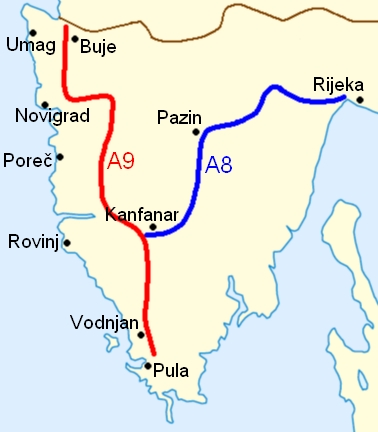

Location
- Istria County
- Roads at junction: E751; A8; A9

Construction
- Maintained by: BINA Istra
- Tolls: Closed toll collection system

The Istrian Y (Croatian: Istarski ipsilon) is a highway network in the Croatian highway network & TEN-T network, maintained by BINA Istra (from 1995 through at least 2027). It consists of two sections arranged in a shape similar to the letter Y, located in Istria County:

- A8 (Matulji – Kanfanar)
- A9 (Plovanija – Pula via Kanfanar)

== Eastern branch ==
The A8 is a 64.21 km (39.90 mi) long branch which starts at Matulji in Primorje-Gorski Kotar County and finishes in Kanfanar interchange, at the crossing with the A9. The branch was initially built as a single carriageway limited-access road, but the part between Kanfanar and Pazin was projected as a dual carriageway, so all the objects on the road are already prepared for a conversion to a motorway.

The most prominent feature of this branch of Istrian Y is the 5.4 km (3.4 mi) long Učka Tunnel, the third longest tunnel in Croatia. The tunnel was opened in 1981 and is the main road that connects the Istrian peninsula with Rijeka and the rest of Croatia (and the only road for vehicles over 5 tonnes). The tunnel is tolled within a closed toll collection system with the rest of the network.

The first part opened as full motorway, from Kanfanar to Rogovići, was opened for traffic in 2011. Then, sections between Rogovići - Cerovlje, Cerovlje - Lupoglav, and Lupoglav - Vranja, opened in consecutive years from 2020.

== Western branch ==
The A9 is a 76.79 km (47.72 mi) long branch which connects the Croatian-Slovenian border near Sečovlje with the city of Pula and services the tourist industry on the western coast of Istria. Motorway was initially built as single carriageway limited-access road.

There are two prominent object on this branch of Istrian Y: the viaduct "Limska draga" and the bridge "Mirna".

The viaduct "Limska draga" was built between 1988 and 1991 and was the first part of the western branch of Istrian Y that was constructed. The bridge is 552 m long and the height of the highest pillon is 120 m.

The bridge "Mirna" was opened to traffic in 2005. The bridge represents the crossing over river Mirna and was the most complicated object on the western branch of the Istrian Y because of the swampy terrain around the river. The bridge is 1355 m long and the height of the bridge at the highest point is 40 m.

The southern leg of A9 motorway, between Kanfanar and Pula was opened as motorway for traffic in 2010. The northern leg of the A9 motorway, 50 km from Umag to Kanfanar, was opened as motorway for traffic on 14 June 2011, eight months before the deadline.

== Upgrade ==
The network is undergoing extensive upgrade & refurbishment works. The works are split into 2 primary phases, then into sub-phases and parts.

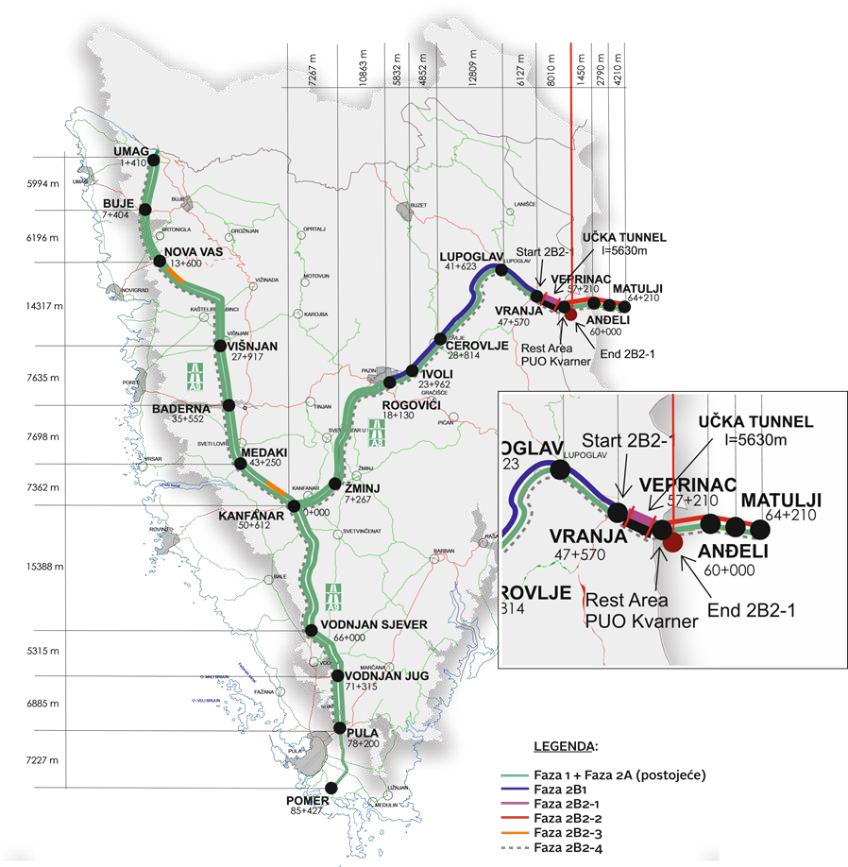
Bina-Istra upgrade phases for the Istrian-Y

=== Completed phases ===
- Phase 1 + 2A
  - Construction of a dual-carriageway highway for the following sections:
    - Umag - Kanfanar - Pula (except for the Mirna Bridge & Limska Draga Viaduct)
    - Kanfanar - Rogovići
  - Construction of a single-carriageway highway for the following sections:
    - Mirna Bridge
    - Limska Draga Viaduct
    - Rogovići - Matulji (via Učka Tunnel)
    - Pula - Pomer
    - Plovanija - Umag
- Phase 2B1
  - Construction of a 28 km (17 mi) second carriageway between Rogovići & Vranja
- Phase 2B2-1 All works in the 3 sub-parts are estimated to cost a total of EUR 191 million, including the costs for the new Učka Tunnel tube.
  - Part A
    - Construction of a new 5.63 km (3.50 mi) tube for Učka Tunnel
    - Construction of a 1.9 km (1.2 mi) second carriageway between Vranja and Učka Tunnel's Istrian portal
    - Construction of a 0.45 km (0.28 mi) second carriageway on Učka Tunnel's Kvarner portal
    - Construction of a new 268.6 m (881 ft) Zrinšćak viaduct
    - Construction of a new Vranja interchange, including new toll-booth
    - Construction of new overpasses & underpasses
    - Construction of a connection road between the carriageways over the Istrian portals
    - Construction of two new toll-booths on either side of the Učka Tunnel
    - Construction of a new building for the firefighting unit near the Istrian portal
    - Demolition of one existing toll-booth on the existing Vranja interchange
  - Part B
    - Replacement of the existing rest area with a full service station at the Kvarner portal
  - Completed other works
    - Construction of a service station at Rebri to replace the service station at the Istrian portal
    - Upgrades to the existing tube's emergency and signalization systems
    - Construction of new service buildings at the Kvarner portal
  - Other works
    - Construction of a new Učka Tunnel control room

=== Phases under construction ===
These phases were not confirmed until 2023. Works on these phases were started after the official breakthrough of the second Učka Tunnel tube on the 18th September 2023. They are intended to be complete by late 2026.

The completion of both these phases will mean the entire network will be a dual carriageway profile.

- Phase 2B2-2 This phase is estimated to cost a total of EUR 200 million. When complete, the journey time between Pula and Zagreb should be approximately 2 and a half hours.
  - Construction of a ~10 km (6.2 mi) second carriageway between Matulji & Učka Tunnel's Kvarner portal
  - Construction of an improved junction at Anđeli
  - Construction of drainage and management facilities to reduce the release of harmful liquids from vehicles into the environment
- Phase 2B2-3
  - Construction of a second carriageway for the Mirna Bridge & Limska Draga Viaduct

=== Remaining phases ===
- Phase 2B2-4
  - Construction of emergency lanes for some unprotected sections

== See also ==
- BINA Istra
