= Brest pod Učkom =

Village in Istria, Croatia

Brest pod Učkom Olmeto di Bogliuno
- Village
- Location within Croatia
- Country: Croatia
- County: Istria County
- Municipality: Lupoglav

Area
  - Total: 5.2 sq mi (13.4 km^{2})

Population (2021)
  - Total: 47
  - Density: 9.1/sq mi (3.5/km^{2})
- Time zone: UTC+1 (CET)
  - Summer (DST): UTC+2 (CEST)
- Postal code: 52426 Lupoglav
- Area code: 052

Brest pod Učkom (Italian: Olmeto di Bogliuno) is a village in the municipality of Lupoglav, in Istria County, Croatia.

== Demographics ==
According to the 2021 census, its population was 47. In 2001, the village had 46 residents.
