= Brajkovići (Kanfanar) =

Brajkovići Braicovici
- Village
- Location within Croatia
- Coordinates: 45.113266°N 13.7576229°E
- Country: Croatia
- County: Istria County
- Municipality: Kanfanar

Area
  - Total: 0.23 sq mi (0.6 km^{2})

Population (2021)
  - Total: 92
  - Density: 400/sq mi (150/km^{2})
- Time zone: UTC+1 (CET)
  - Summer (DST): UTC+2 (CEST)
- Postal code: 52352 Kanfanar
- Area code: 052

Brajkovići (Italian: Braicovici) is a village in the municipality of Kanfanar in Istria, Croatia.

== Demographics ==
According to the 2021 census, its population was 92.
