= Lesišćina =

Village in Istria, Croatia

Lesišćina Lesichine
- Village
- Location within Croatia
- Country: Croatia
- County: Istria County
- Municipality: Lupoglav

Area
  - Total: 4.1 sq mi (10.6 km^{2})

Population (2021)
  - Total: 75
  - Density: 18/sq mi (7.1/km^{2})
- Time zone: UTC+1 (CET)
  - Summer (DST): UTC+2 (CEST)
- Postal code: 52434 Boljun
- Area code: 052

Lesišćina (Italian: Lesichine) is a village in the municipality of Lupoglav, in Istria County, Croatia.

== Demographics ==
According to the 2021 census, its population was 75. In 2011, the village also had 75 residents.
