= Maružini =

Maružini Morosini
- Village
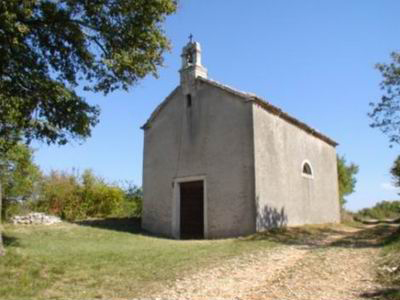
- Church of Our Lady of the Snow

- Location within Croatia
- Coordinates: 45.099787°N 13.8180302°E
- Country: Croatia
- County: Istria County
- Municipality: Kanfanar

Area
  - Total: 1.4 sq mi (3.7 km^{2})

Population (2021)
  - Total: 83
  - Density: 58/sq mi (22/km^{2})
- Time zone: UTC+1 (CET)
  - Summer (DST): UTC+2 (CEST)
- Postal code: 52352 Kanfanar
- Area code: 052

Maružini (Italian: Morosini) is a village in the municipality of Kanfanar in Istria, Croatia.

== Demographics ==
According to the 2021 census, its population was 83.
