= Sošići =

Sošići Sossi
- Village
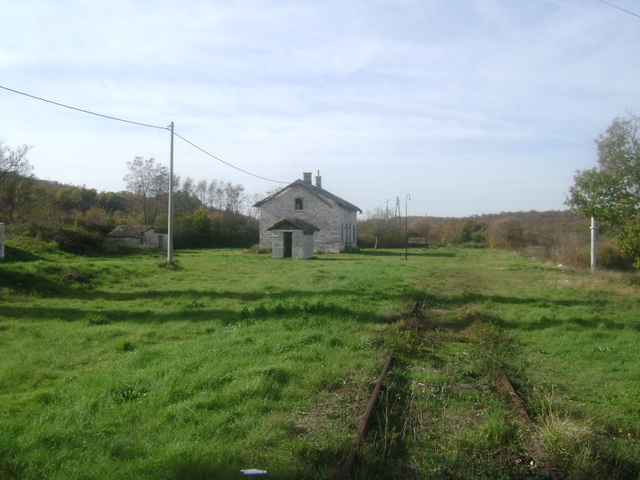

- Location within Croatia
- Coordinates: 45.1181323°N 13.7447723°E
- Country: Croatia
- County: Istria County
- Municipality: Kanfanar

Area
  - Total: 0.31 sq mi (0.8 km^{2})

Population (2021)
  - Total: 67
  - Density: 220/sq mi (84/km^{2})
- Time zone: UTC+1 (CET)
  - Summer (DST): UTC+2 (CEST)
- Postal code: 52352 Kanfanar
- Area code: 052

Sošići (Italian: Sossi) is a village in the municipality of Kanfanar in Istria, Croatia.

== Demographics ==
According to the 2021 census, its population was 67.
