= Boljunsko Polje =

Village in Istria, Croatia

Boljunsko Polje Mandici
- Village
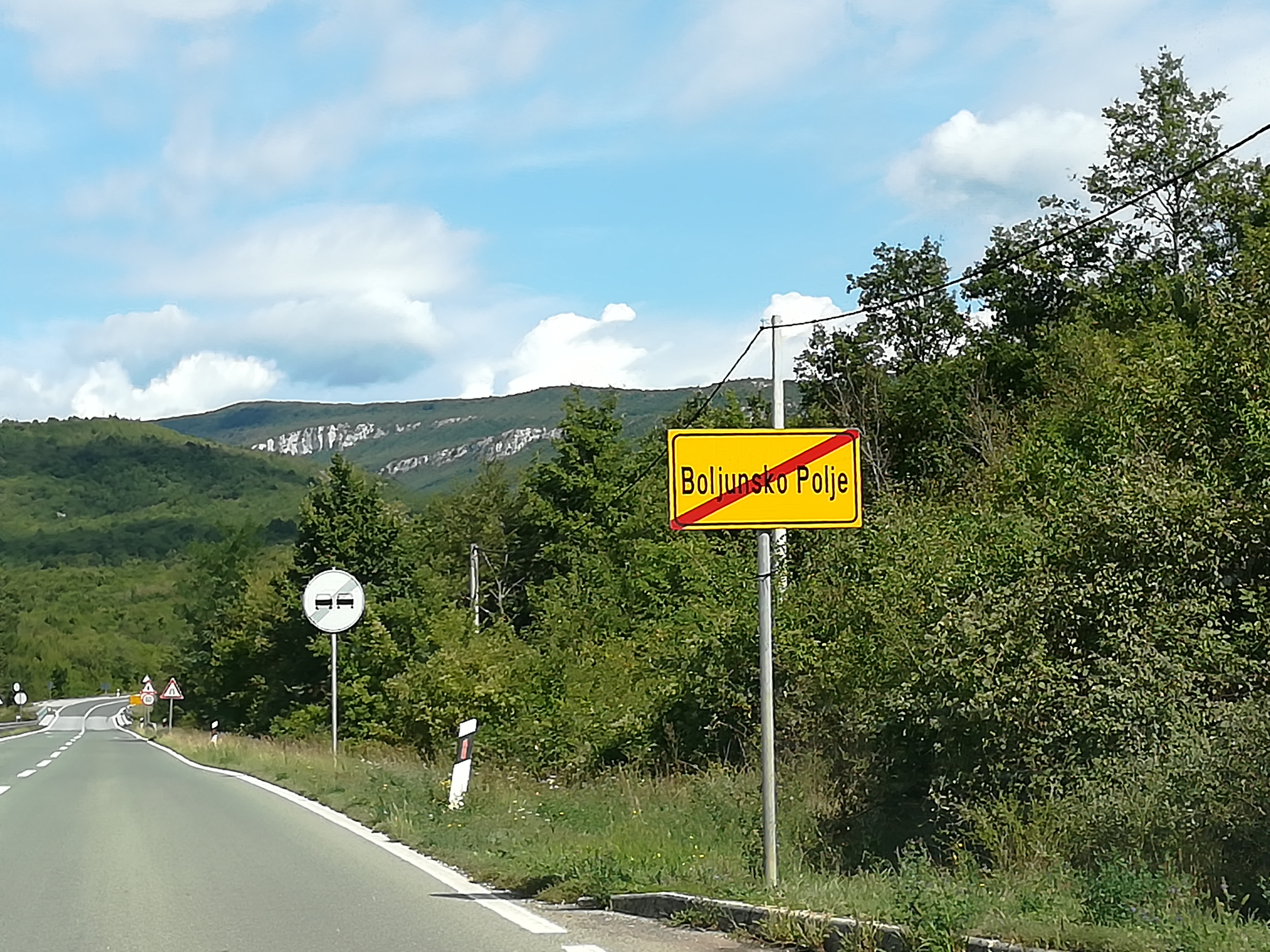

- Location within Croatia
- Country: Croatia
- County: Istria County
- Municipality: Lupoglav

Area
  - Total: 4.9 sq mi (12.7 km^{2})

Population (2021)
  - Total: 143
  - Density: 29.2/sq mi (11.3/km^{2})
- Time zone: UTC+1 (CET)
  - Summer (DST): UTC+2 (CEST)
- Postal code: 52434 Boljun
- Area code: 052

Boljunsko Polje (Italian: Mandici or Piana di Bogliuno) is a village in the municipality of Lupoglav, in Istria County, Croatia.

== Demographics ==
According to the 2021 census, its population was 143. In 2001, the village had 150 residents.
