= Okreti =

Okreti Ocretti
- Village
- Location within Croatia
- Coordinates: 45.1182944°N 13.7564715°E
- Country: Croatia
- County: Istria County
- Municipality: Kanfanar

Area
  - Total: 1.2 sq mi (3.1 km^{2})

Population (2021)
  - Total: 47
  - Density: 39/sq mi (15/km^{2})
- Time zone: UTC+1 (CET)
  - Summer (DST): UTC+2 (CEST)
- Postal code: 52352 Kanfanar
- Area code: 052

Okreti (Italian: Ocretti) is a village in the municipality of Kanfanar in Istria, Croatia.

== Demographics ==
According to the 2021 census, its population was 47.
