= Žuntići =

Žuntići Zonti
- Village
- Location within Croatia
- Coordinates: 45.1189709°N 13.733723°E
- Country: Croatia
- County: Istria County
- Municipality: Kanfanar

Area
  - Total: 0.19 sq mi (0.5 km^{2})

Population (2021)
  - Total: 25
  - Density: 130/sq mi (50/km^{2})
- Time zone: UTC+1 (CET)
  - Summer (DST): UTC+2 (CEST)
- Postal code: 52352 Kanfanar
- Area code: 052

Žuntići (Italian: Zonti) is a village in the municipality of Kanfanar in Istria, Croatia.

== Demographics ==
According to the 2021 census, its population was 25.
