= Matohanci =

Matohanci Motoanci, Motocanzi
- Village
- Location within Croatia
- Coordinates: 45.1098067°N 13.750727°E
- Country: Croatia
- County: Istria County
- Municipality: Kanfanar

Area
  - Total: 0.15 sq mi (0.4 km^{2})

Population (2021)
  - Total: 68
  - Density: 440/sq mi (170/km^{2})
- Time zone: UTC+1 (CET)
  - Summer (DST): UTC+2 (CEST)
- Postal code: 52352 Kanfanar
- Area code: 052

Matohanci (Italian: Motoanci or Motocanzi) is a village in the municipality of Kanfanar in Istria, Croatia.

== Demographics ==
According to the 2021 census, its population was 68.
