= Barat, Kanfanar =

Barat Baratto di Canfanaro
- Village
- Location within Croatia
- Coordinates: 45.1511957°N 13.8141282°E
- Country: Croatia
- County: Istria County
- Municipality: Kanfanar

Area
  - Total: 1.7 sq mi (4.4 km^{2})

Population (2021)
  - Total: 48
  - Density: 28/sq mi (11/km^{2})
- Time zone: UTC+1 (CET)
  - Summer (DST): UTC+2 (CEST)
- Postal code: 52352 Kanfanar
- Area code: 052

Barat (Italian: Baratto di Canfanaro) is a village in the municipality of Kanfanar in Istria, Croatia.

== Demographics ==
According to the 2021 census, its population was 48.
