= Ladići =

Ladići Ladici, Ladich, Villa Ladetich
- Village
- Location within Croatia
- Coordinates: 45°08′14″N 13°49′29″E
- Country: Croatia
- County: Istria County
- Municipality: Kanfanar

Area
  - Total: 1.1 sq mi (2.9 km^{2})

Population (2021)
  - Total: 35
  - Density: 31/sq mi (12/km^{2})
- Time zone: UTC+1 (CET)
  - Summer (DST): UTC+2 (CEST)
- Postal code: 52352 Kanfanar
- Area code: 052

Ladići (Italian: Ladici or Ladich or Villa Ladetich) is a village in Croatia.

== Ladići inscription ==
In 1982, Branko Fučić published the text of a Glagolitic inscription found in Ladići:

ⰝⰗⰕⰑⰅⰃⰁ?
ⰃⰓⰃⰖⰓⰀ
ⰄⰖⰁⰓⰀ
ⰂⰜⰀⰋ[Ⱀ]ⰅⰃ[Ⰰ]
ⰄⰋ

The inscription marks the gravestone of a certain Grgur Dubravac. It was lost, but it is likely under the facade of a house once owned by Anton Rabar according to Anton Meden. A reproduction by Luka Kirac survives.

== Demographics ==
According to the 2021 census, its population was 35. It was 34 in 2011.
