= Burići (Kanfanar) =

Burići Burich, Burici
- Village
- Location within Croatia
- Coordinates: 45.1103185°N 13.8146198°E
- Country: Croatia
- County: Istria County
- Municipality: Kanfanar

Area
  - Total: 1.2 sq mi (3.2 km^{2})

Population (2021)
  - Total: 54
  - Density: 44/sq mi (17/km^{2})
- Time zone: UTC+1 (CET)
  - Summer (DST): UTC+2 (CEST)
- Postal code: 52352 Kanfanar
- Area code: 052

Burići (Italian: Burich or Burici) is a village in the municipality of Kanfanar in Istria, Croatia.

== Demographics ==
According to the 2021 census, its population was 54.
