= Marić =

Marić (Serbian Cyrillic: Марић, pronounced [mǎːritɕ]) is a South Slavic surname. It is the fourth most common surname in Croatia.

Notable people with the name include:

- Adnan Marić (born 1997), Swedish footballer
- Aleks Marić (born 1984), Australian basketball player
- Alisa Marić (born 1970), Serbian-American chess Woman's Grandmaster and International Master
- Andrea Marić (born 1997), Croatian basketball player
- Arijana Marić Gigliani (born 1979), Croatian-Bosnian opera singer
- August Marić (1885–1957), Croatian soldier
- Darko Marić (born 1975), Serbian footballer
- Enver Marić (born 1948), Bosnian footballer
- Goran Marić (born 1984), Serbian footballer
- Goran Marić (born 1981), Serbian volleyball player
- Igor Marić (born 1982), Croatian bobsledder
- Igor Marić (born 1985), Croatian basketball player
- Ivan Maric (born 1986), Australian rules footballer
- Ivana Marić (born 1982), Bosnian Croat singer
- Ivan Marić) (born 1994), Serbian footballer
- Jovan Marić (1941–2023), Bosnia-Serb psychiatrist
- Ljubica Marić (1909–2002), Serbian composer
- Luka Marić (1899–1979), Croatian geologist
- Luka Marić (born 1987), Croatian footballer
- Luka Marić (born 2002), Austrian footballer
- Marcela Marić (born 1996), Croatian Olympic diver
- Marijo Marić (born 1977), Croatian footballer
- Marino Marić (born 1990), Croatian handball player
- Marko Marić (born 1983), Croatian footballer, midfielder
- Marko Marić (born 1996), Croatian footballer, goalkeeper
- Martin Marić (born 1984), Croatian track and field athlete
- Mateo Marić (born 1998), Bosnian footballer
- Mijat Marić (born 1984), Croatian-Swiss footballer
- Milan Marić (born 1981), Serbian actor
- Milan Marić (born 1990), Serbian actor
- Mileva Marić (1875–1948), Serbian mathematician and Albert Einstein's first wife
- Milomir Marić (born 1956), Serbian journalist
- Miloš Marić (born 1982), Serbian footballer
- Mirjana Marić (born 1970), Serbian chess player
- Mirko Marić (born 1995), Croatian footballer
- Mirko Marić (1908–1942) Chetnik Duke and regiment commander
- Oliver Maric (born 1981), Croatian-Swiss footballer
- Petar Marić (born 1987), Croatian basketball player
- Radenka Maric, American scientist and academic administrator
- Silvio Marić (born 1975), Croatian footballer
- Slavko Marić (born 1984), Serbian footballer
- Tomislav Marić (born 1973), Croatian footballer
- Zdravko Marić (born 1977), Croatian politician
- Zoran Marić (born 1960), Serbian footballer

== See also ==
- Marići, eponymous villages
