= Kurili =

Kurili Curilli
- Village
- Location within Croatia
- Coordinates: 45.1008315°N 13.7694269°E
- Country: Croatia
- County: Istria County
- Municipality: Kanfanar

Area
  - Total: 2.5 sq mi (6.5 km^{2})

Population (2021)
  - Total: 43
  - Density: 17/sq mi (6.6/km^{2})
- Time zone: UTC+1 (CET)
  - Summer (DST): UTC+2 (CEST)
- Postal code: 52352 Kanfanar
- Area code: 052

Kurili (Italian: Curilli) is a village in the municipality of Kanfanar in Istria, Croatia.

== Demographics ==
According to the 2021 census, its population was 43.
