= Bubani =

Village in Croatia

Bubani Babani
- Village
- Location within Croatia
- Coordinates: 45°07′05″N 13°44′42″E
- Country: Croatia
- County: Istria County
- Municipality: Kanfanar

Area
  - Total: 0.69 sq mi (1.8 km^{2})

Population (2021)
  - Total: 58
  - Density: 83/sq mi (32/km^{2})
- Time zone: UTC+1 (CET)
  - Summer (DST): UTC+2 (CEST)
- Postal code: 52352 Kanfanar
- Area code: 052

Bubani (Italian: Babani) is a village in Croatia.

== Demographics ==
According to the 2021 census, its population was 58. It was 56 in 2011.
