= Učka Tunnel =

Road tunnel in Croatia

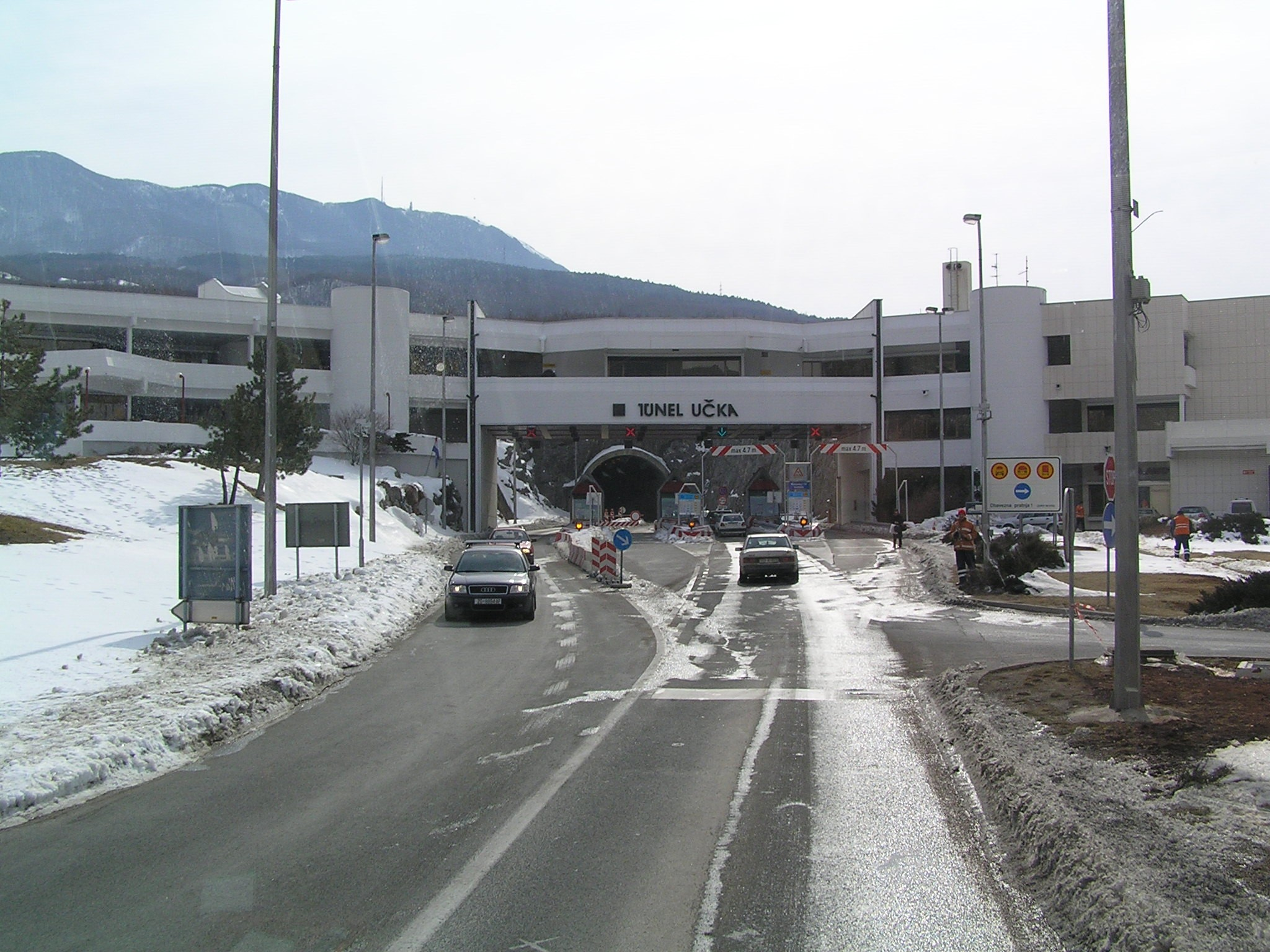
- Učka Tunnel western approach to the Istrian portal, prior to the opening of the westbound tube in 2024 (A8)

- Location within Croatia
- Interactive map of Učka Tunnel

Overview
- Official name: Tunel Učka
- Location: Istria County, Primorje-Gorski Kotar County, Croatia
- Coordinates: 45°18′48″N 14°12′51″E
- Crosses: Učka

Operation
- Opened: September 27, 1981 (original, eastbound); September 13, 2024 (westbound)
- Owner: BINA Istra
- Toll: €4.50

Technical
- Length: 5,062 m (16,608 ft) (original, eastbound); 5,634 m (18,484 ft) (westbound)
- No. of lanes: 2 per tube
- Operating speed: 80 km/h (50 mph)
- Width: 9.1 m (30 ft)

The Učka Tunnel (Croatian: Tunel Učka) is a toll tunnel on the A8 motorway in Croatia, under the Učka mountain range, as part of the Istrian Y network in Istria owned and operated by BINA Istra (owning the highway in a concession from 1995 to 2041).

The tunnel consists of two traffic tubes carrying two lanes each. The original tunnel tube, which opened for traffic on the 27 September 1981, is 9.1 meters (30 ft) wide and 5,062 m (16,608 ft) long. The second tunnel tube, opened for traffic on the 13 September 2024 is 5,634 m (18,484 ft) long. It is the third longest in Croatia after the Mala Kapela and Sveti Rok tunnels. Construction on the original tunnel tube began in 1978, and at the time of opening it was the longest road tunnel in Yugoslavia.

The toll is part of the rest of the closed toll collection system in use on the Istrian Y. The shortest possible journey through it costs €4.50 for a class I vehicle.

It is rated Class D/E under the ADR treaty for hazardous materials transportation, and vehicles transporting restricted goods must be pre-arranged and escorted. It is the only suitable road between Istria and the rest of Croatia for vehicles over five tonnes.

In 2022 more than 1.94 million vehicles passed through with AADT of 5,326 and ASDT of 7,361.

== Safety Concerns ==
In a 2004 traffic safety test by ADAC, the Učka Tunnel shared the last place with Tuhobić Tunnel, also from Croatia, being classified as a high-risk transportation utility.

In 2008, the Tuhobić Tunnel was widened to four lanes. However, no improvements were made to the Učka Tunnel, causing a demonstration clogging the traffic at a tunnel entrance by Istrian bikers.

More serious implications of the tunnels lack of safety were seen in October 2019, when the European Commission recalled Croatia on their obligations to comply with the minimum safety requirements set out in the Tunnel Safety Directive. Tunnels already in operation on 30 April 2006, and that were not already in accordance with the safety requirements, had to be modernized by 30 April 2014. For certain tunnels, as it is the case of Učka’s tunnel, that period could be prolonged by five years (until 30 April 2019). However, due to the lack of upgrade to the tunnel, this obligation was not met. As such, the government of Croatia accelerated the works.

== Upgrade ==
In June 2011, BINA Istra announced that design documents were being prepared for construction of the second tunnel tube of the Učka Tunnel, and that construction was scheduled to start in mid-2012, estimating its completion in 2015.

However, this construction never started. It was transferred to be part of the wider Istrian Y upgrade plan, as part of the 2B2-1 phase.

The excavation of the second 5.63 km (3.50 mi) tunnel tube started on 17 December 2020 and was officially completed on the 18 September 2023. It was opened to traffic on 13 September 2024, slightly later than originally planned.

In the existing tunnel tube, upgrades of the emergency and signalization systems are ongoing.

== See also ==
- A8 motorway
- BINA Istra
- Učka
