= Mrgani =

Mrgani Morgani
- Village
- Location within Croatia
- Coordinates: 45.130713°N 13.7581949°E
- Country: Croatia
- County: Istria County
- Municipality: Kanfanar

Area
  - Total: 1.9 sq mi (5.0 km^{2})

Population (2021)
  - Total: 27
  - Density: 14/sq mi (5.4/km^{2})
- Time zone: UTC+1 (CET)
  - Summer (DST): UTC+2 (CEST)
- Postal code: 52352 Kanfanar
- Area code: 052

Mrgani (Italian: Morgani) is a village in the municipality of Kanfanar in Istria, Croatia.

== Demographics ==
According to the 2021 census, its population was 27.
