= Beram =

Village in Croatia

Beram Vermo
- Village
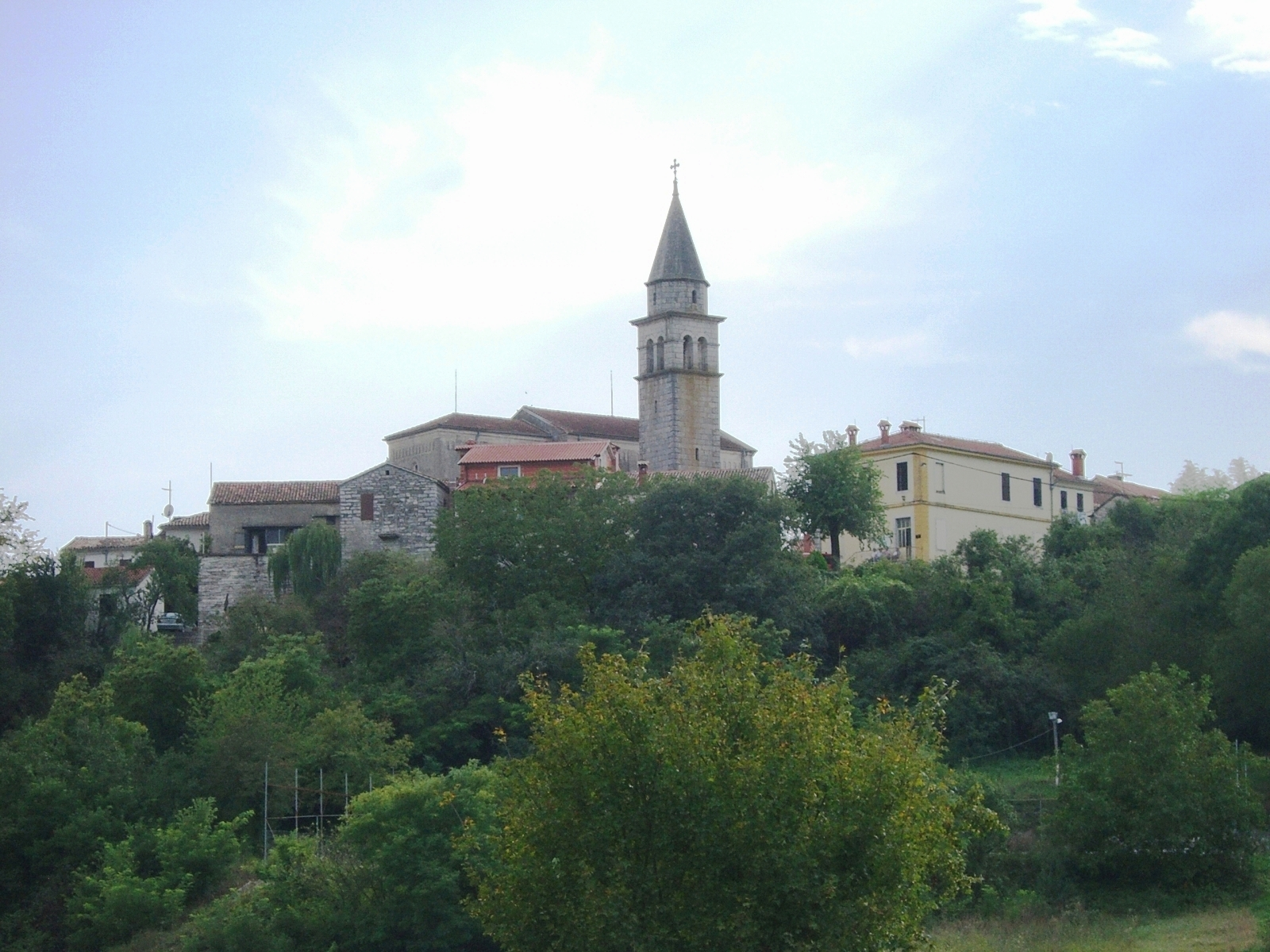
- Beram seen from northeast

- Flag Seal

- Location within Croatia
- Coordinates: 45°15′0″N 13°54′0″E
- Country: Croatia
- County: Istria County
- Municipality: Pazin

Area
  - Total: 4.4 sq mi (11.5 km^{2})

Population (2021)
  - Total: 222
  - Density: 50.0/sq mi (19.3/km^{2})
- Time zone: UTC+1 (CET)
  - Summer (DST): UTC+2 (CEST)
- Postal code: 52000 Pazin
- Area code: 052
- Vehicle registration: PU

Beram (Italian: Vermo, German: Burgerdorf [obsolete]) is a small village located in the Croatian county of Istria. It is part of the municipality of Pazin and is situated approximately five kilometres (3.1 mi) northwest of the town, on the road to Poreč. The village has a population of about 250 inhabitants. It is well-known for its Biblia pauperum ('the paupers' Bible') and the Danse Macabre ('Dance of Death') fresco in the Church of Maria im Fels ('Mary in the Rock').

The name of the village dates to pre-Roman times, and the castle of Beram was originally called Verm, which led to the Italian place name, Vermo. The German castle's name was Berm, and it was from this name that the Slavic name Beram was derived.

== Name ==
Historically, Beram was also known as Vermum and Vermo.

== Geology and location ==
Located in the gently undulating karst landscape of the Istrian Plate, Beram is situated at an altitude of 321 metres (1,053 ft) on the northern hill of Mount Càmus (365 m or 1,198 ft). The village lies to the east of the valley of the Čipri stream, which is an extension of the Lim Valley (Limska draga). Beram is surrounded by several notable towns and cities, including Pazin to the southeast, Motovun to the northwest, Sveti Petar u Šumi to the south, and Poreč, situated on the coast, to the west.

== History ==
=== Antiquity ===
Beram's history extends back to the Bronze Age, over 4,000 years ago, when a fortified settlement was established on the hill.

The southern slope of the area was used as a large prehistoric necropolis, with numerous archaeological finds discovered, many of which date back several millennia. These findings, including a bronze cista adorned with geometric figures and birds discovered in 1882, are now housed in the Museum of Labin and other institutions. Moreover, 172 burial urns from the Bronze Age were also uncovered, suggesting that cremation was a common practice during that era, with no evidence of in-ground burials found. Dimensions of the site have hardly changed since that time, providing a glimpse into the ancient landscape of the area.

=== Middle Ages ===
==== Early Middle Ages ====
Beram's history during the Roman occupation remains unclear, as no artifacts have been found from that period. However, in the early Middle Ages, the settlement was surrounded by a double wall, fortified with a rectangular tower for added protection. This strategic location made Beram an important stop for travelers and merchants passing through the region.

Once flowing through the valley of Beram, which now belongs to the Lim Valley, the Fojba River was an essential route for trade and travel. Following the collapse of the Roman Empire, soldiers were stationed in Beram to protect this vital traffic route, preventing access between central Istria and the sea.

However, at the end of the 6th century, Beram fell victim to an invasion by Slavs, leading to a series of bloody battles throughout north-eastern Istria. The village was destroyed during these conflicts, and it took time to rebuild and restore it to its former glory.

==== High and Late Middle Ages ====
Beram was first documented in a deed of gift from King Berengar to the Bishop of Trieste in 911.

However, during the 12th and 14th centuries, the affiliation of the church in Beram changed frequently. In 1177, it was attached to the Church of Poreč, along with other churches in the diocese. Later in 1230, the fief went to the Bishop of Trieste, as it had been decided in 1040. The Bishop then gave it to the podestà of Trieste in 1333. However, in 1355, the Bishop of Trieste regained the right and granted the fief to the Bishop of Poreč.

In 1344, a war broke out between the Venetians and the Count of Pazin, Albert IV, due to numerous raids in Venetia. The Count was taken prisoner during the conflict and was forced to surrender the walls and castle of Beram to be released. In 1374, the Count of Pazin died, and Beram and the entire county became a part of Austria, except for the feudal rights of the church.

=== Modern times ===
In the 16th century, Beram was badly damaged. In 1508 and 1509 the place was occupied by the Venetians after Austria under Maximilian I surrendered without a fight in the war against the Venetians. In 1511, the Turks carried out several raids in the vicinity of Beram, devastating and destroying the area. Due to the war and the consequences of the plague, the land was deserted. Therefore, the lords of Beram arranged for large immigration flows of Maurovalachen people from the Balkans. Due to the increase in population, Beram had the status of a small town in 1578.

Its parish had already been founded by 1177. Pastoral visitations by the Bishop of Poreč took place in the years: 1603, 1625, 1635, 1639, 1645, 1649, 1653, 1653, 1658, 1663, 1668, 1676, 1683, 1689, 1695, 1697, 1710, 1737, 1745, 1780 and 1781.

After the end of the Austro-Venetian War, Beram was largely at peace for several centuries. In the 17th century, a permanent market was held in the town. In 1797, Istria fell to Austria after the Peace of Campo Formio and to France in 1805 at the Peace of Pressburg. After the reconquest in 1815, Istria was rejoined by Austria.

After World War I, Istria became part of Italy, which lasted until the end of World War II when it was annexed by Yugoslavia and became part of the Republic of Croatia within the Federal People's Republic of Yugoslavia. After the breakup of Yugoslavia in 1991, Croatia declared independence and was recognized under international law on 23 January 1992.

== Demographics ==
According to the 2021 census, its population was 222.

Beram's population has undergone significant changes throughout its history. In the 16th century, the town was heavily impacted by wars and the plague, resulting in a sharp decline in population. However, the population began to increase again in the same century due to the arrival of Maurovalahs immigrants from the Balkans, who comprised around 150 families.

As of the 2001 census, there were a total of 234 inhabitants in Beram, with a slightly higher number of males (121) than females (113). The male population showed a higher frequency in the age groups of five to 14 years and 30 to 45 years, while the female population had a larger proportion in the age group of five to 14 years. Among the 62 private households in Beram, the majority consisted of couples with children. The town is predominantly Roman Catholic, as is the higher-level municipality of Pazin, where 88 percent of the population is of the Catholic faith.

Year	Residents
1972	200
2001	234
2004	250

== Culture ==
The town with a rich cultural heritage, particularly in the field of Glagolitic writing, Beram has been home to an exceptionally large number of scripts, including original Istrian scripts as well as some of the oldest works from the 13th and 14th centuries. Beram was once an important center for Glagolitic writing knowledge, attracting students from all over Istria who came to learn the script.

The writings can be found in the form of public inscriptions, in books, and on the walls of medieval churches. Among the most significant works from Beram are illuminated Glagolitic manuscripts, such as the 13th-century collection of sermons and the richly painted 14th-century missal. Some of these manuscripts are on display in the National and University Library of Slovenia.

== Significant places and buildings ==
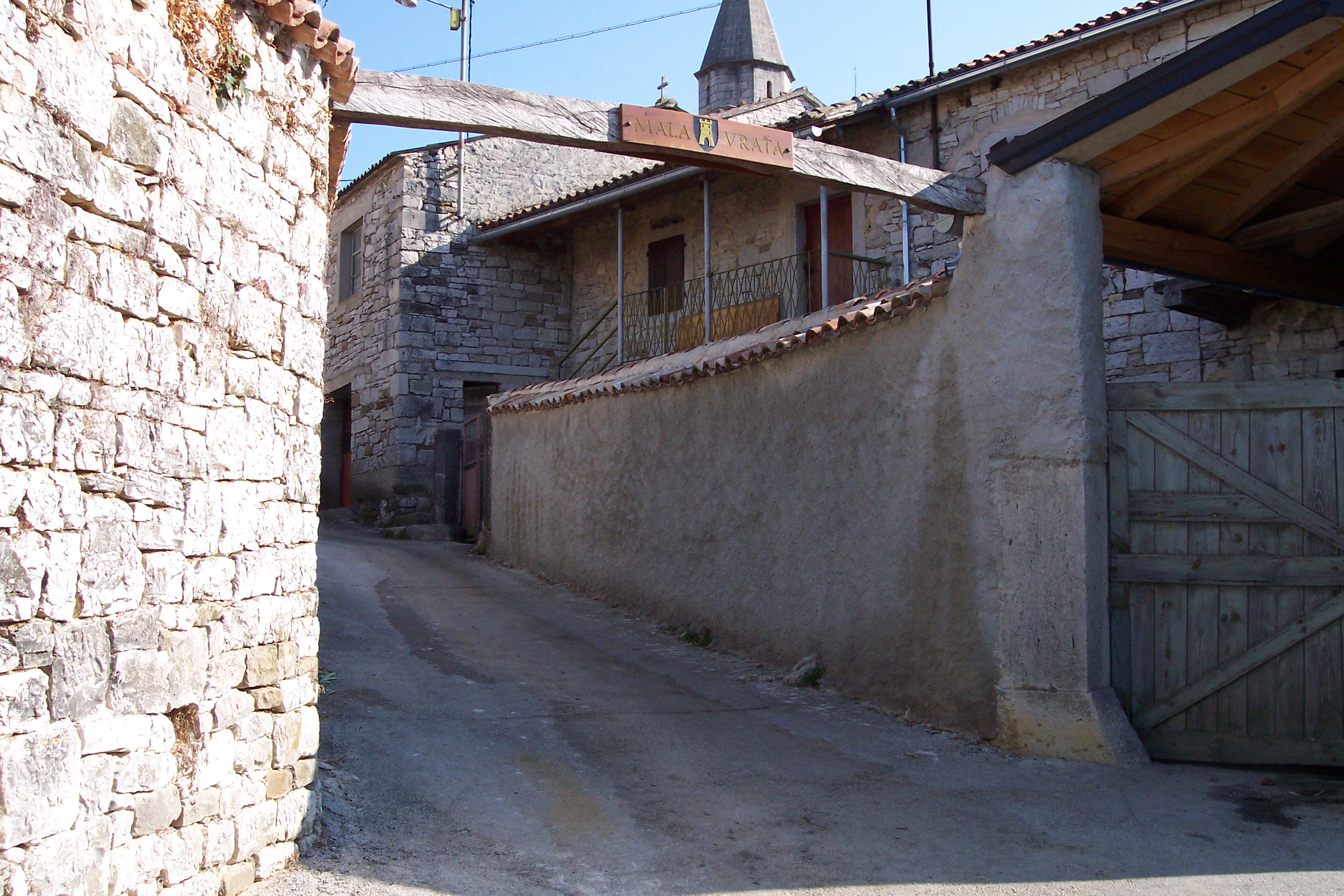
The Mala Vrata (Small Door) in the south, the former entrance to the village

At the heart of Beram lies the main square, where visitors can admire the impressive St. Martin's Church and its tower. The square also features a monument honoring those who lost their lives in the Second World War, as well as a charming fountain. On the southern side of the square is the birthplace of Vladimir Gortan, a notable Croatian writer and poet, with a small memorial dedicated to him. Visitors can also explore the Gortan Memorial Ossuary, located in Podberam, on the other side of the road from Pazin to Poreč, which was constructed in 1951.

Just south of the village, visitors can see the Mala Vrata (Small Door), which served as the entrance to the village during its earliest phase, as well as a remnant of the medieval fortress walls. Another remnant of the walls is situated to the west. To the north of Beram, on the access road, stands a large stone cross, while the Calvary, built in 1901, is located to the west.

=== St. Martin's Church ===
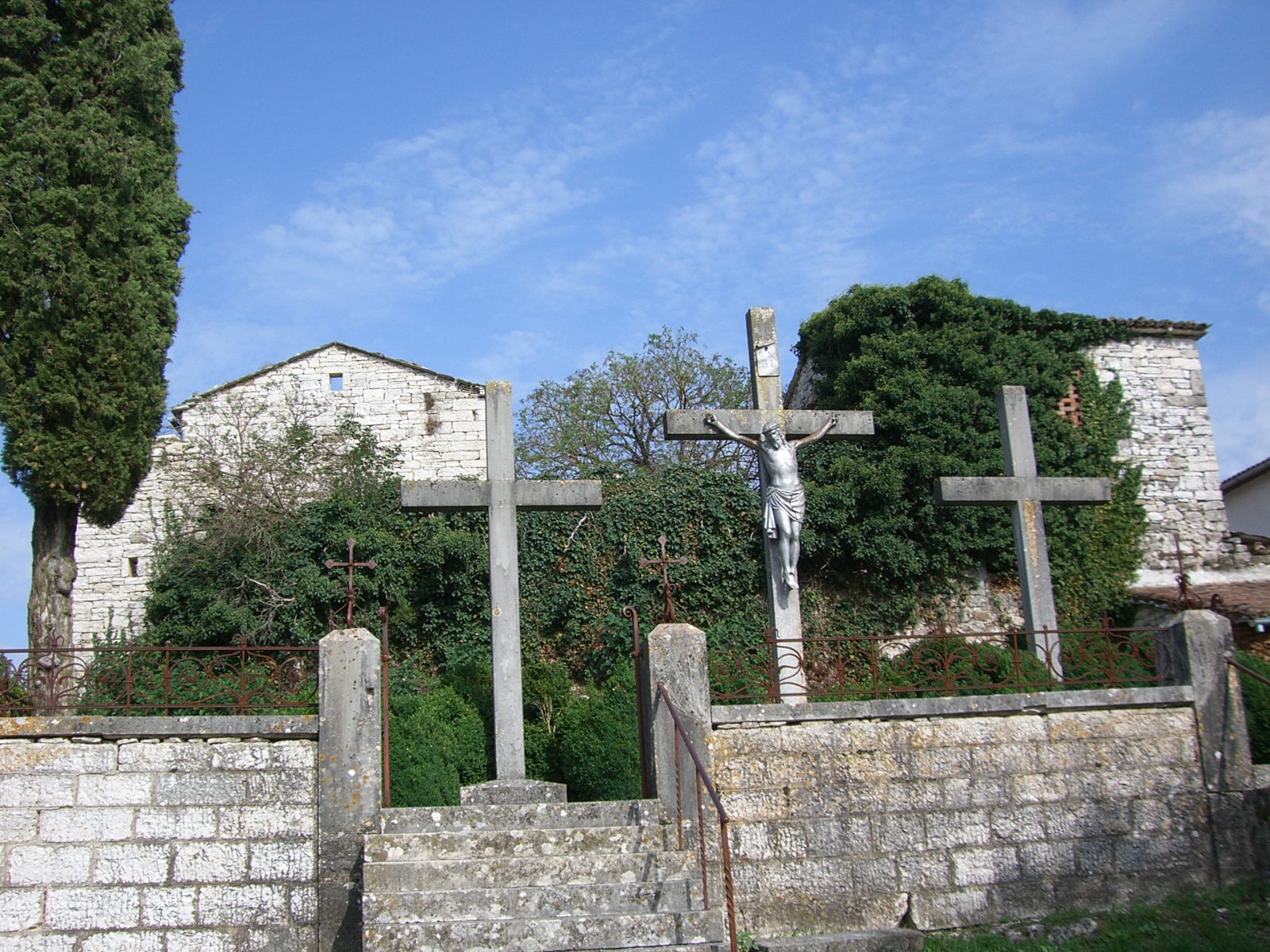
Calvary in the west from 1901

In Gothic-style, the parish church of Saint Martin was built in 1431; it underwent significant renovations in 1910, during which a new nave was added to the existing structure. The Glagolitic inscription on the baptismal font is evidence of the church's early origins, while the façade of the church contains an inscription documenting the renovations. Today, the church consists of two parts: the older Gothic sanctuary behind the altar and the newer nave in front of it. The older part is now used as the sanctuary, and the apse has been converted into the sacristy.

==== Architecture and interior design ====
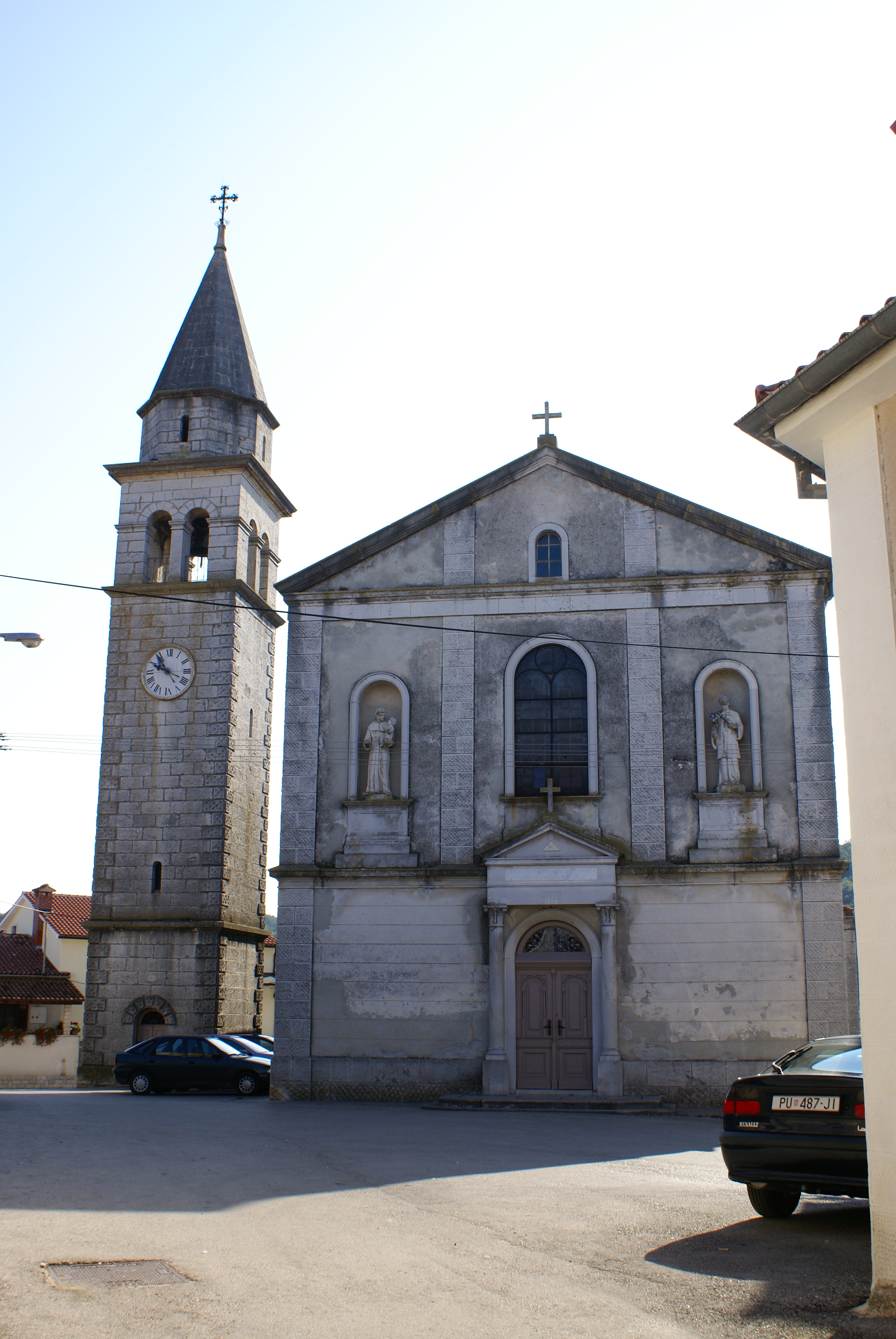
The Church of Saint Martin on the main square

The architecture of St. Martin's Church features a blend of Gothic and Renaissance styles. The outer wall of the entrance is adorned with four pilasters made of limestone, and between them, statues of two saints are set into the façade. The entrance is topped by a pediment supported by two columns with Corinthian capitals.

The bell tower, standing separately from the church, is a prominent feature of the village's skyline. It was constructed in 1903 on the foundations of an older tower and is about 30 meters high. The tower is built with limestone blocks arranged in a regular pattern, with decorative flowers on the cornerstones. Above this are biforia windows (double-arched windows) on all sides of the tower. It has several cornices, with the tower clock located under the second one. The top of the tower is an octagonal section on which the spire is placed. In the past, there was a larger tower attached to the church, which remained intact until the 17th century.

The sanctuary has a ribbed vault with a pointed arch. The nave has a flat beamed ceiling. The church has Gothic wall paintings from the 15th century and a late Gothic stone relief of St. Martin of Tours. The altarpiece by Mato Celestin Medović was made in the 19th century and shows Beram's connection with the Croatian territories at that time. There are also valuable silver objects and vestments from the 15th to 17th centuries in the church. In addition to some Glagolitic inscriptions in the baptistery, there are some manuscripts in Latin from the 14th and 15th centuries, a collection of sermons from the 13th century, and the richly painted missal from the 14th century.

==== Frescoes ====
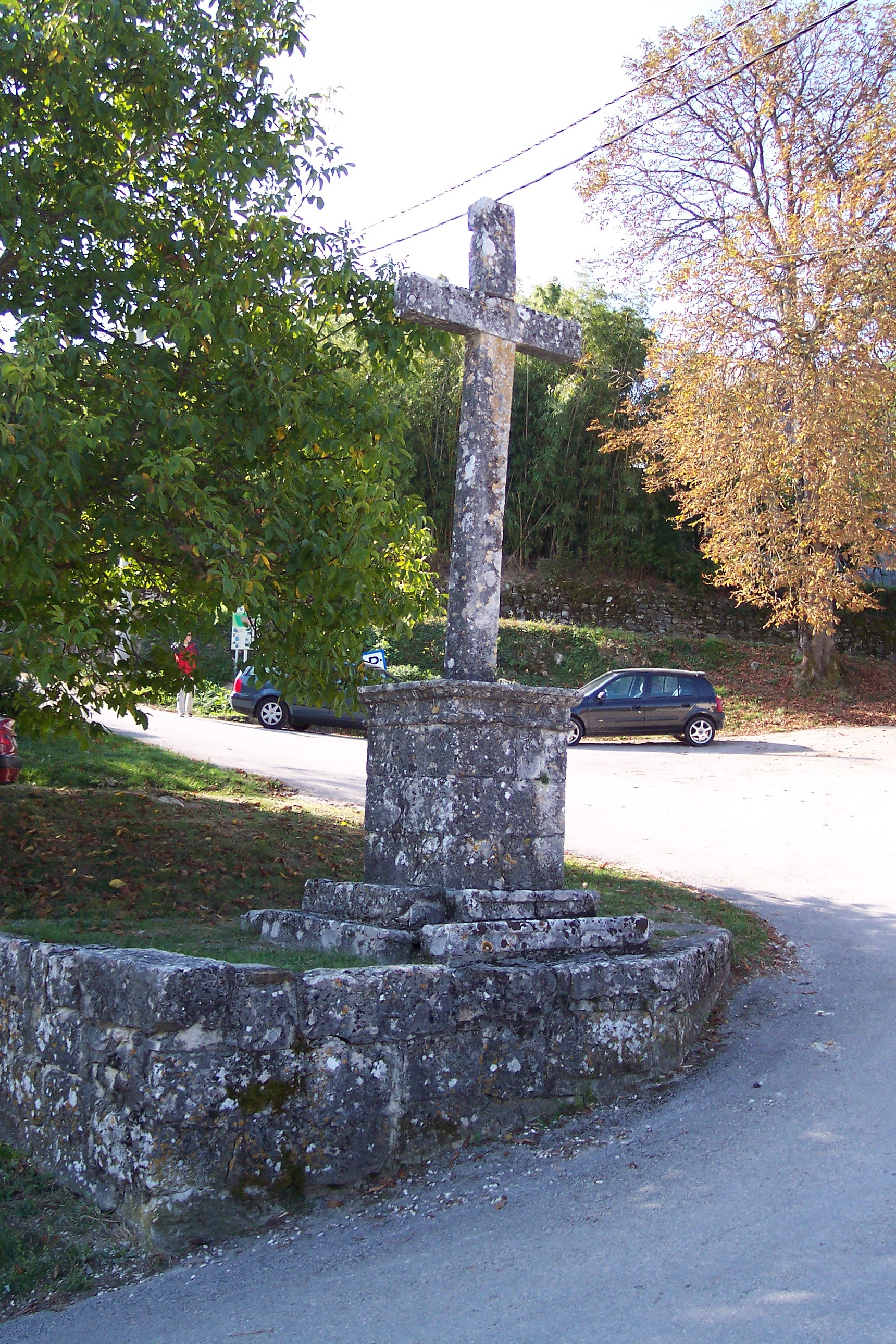
The stone cross in the north

The Gothic wall paintings in the older part of the church, today's chancel, date from the time when the first building was erected. This makes the paintings older than the much better-known frescoes in the church of Maria im Fels. They were created by two different artists. The triforium wall was painted by a Friulian master of the Venetian school. The second painter designed the vault as well as the walls and is of northern Italian origin.

A Byzantine iconographic portrait of Mary and singing and musician angels in the Trecento style are still preserved on the triumphal wall. The latter originally belonged to the composition Glorification of Mary. In the paintings, the artist contrasts pale skin colors, bold robe colors, and warm and cold tones.

On the vault are the symbols of the four evangelists and red cherubim; on the walls are figures of saints, including Saint Martin. In contrast to the other artist, this artist uses balanced colors and emphasizes modeling.

=== Church of Mary im Fels ===
The pilgrimage church of Maria im Fels, also known as Holy Mary on the Stone (or Slate) Tablets (Sveta Marija na Škriljinah), was constructed during the 13th century. Located approximately one kilometre (0.62 mi) northeast of Beram, set in the village cemetery, the church is widely recognized for its 46 impressive frescoes, which were created by Vincent from Kastav in 1474.

== Literature ==
- Dario Alberi, Vermo – Beram in Istria. Storia, arte, cultura. Lint, Triest 1997, pp. 1453–1461
- Radovan Ivančević: Beram. Verlag Jugoslavija, Belgrad 1965. Translation from Serbo-Croatian by Zora Keran.

== Bibliography ==
- Jelinčić, Jakov; Uljančić-Vekić, Elena (2007-02-02). "Popis lokaliteta pastoralnih vizitacija porečkih biskupa u 17. i 18. stoljeću" [List of Locations of Pastoral Visitations of the Bishops of Poreč in the 17th and 18th Century]. Vjesnik istarskog arhiva (in Serbo-Croatian) (8–10): 107–174. ISSN 0353-7153.
