= Semić =

Village in Istria, Croatia

Semić Semi
- Village
- Location within Croatia
- Country: Croatia
- County: Istria County
- Municipality: Lupoglav

Area
  - Total: 2.7 sq mi (7.0 km^{2})

Population (2021)
  - Total: 69
  - Density: 26/sq mi (9.9/km^{2})
- Time zone: UTC+1 (CET)
  - Summer (DST): UTC+2 (CEST)
- Postal code: 52434 Boljun
- Area code: 052

Semić (Italian: Semi) is a village in the municipality of Lupoglav, in Istria County, Croatia.

== Demographics ==
According to the 2021 census, its population was 69. In 2001, the village had 99 residents.
