= Boljun =

Village in Istria, Croatia

Boljun Bogliuno
- Village
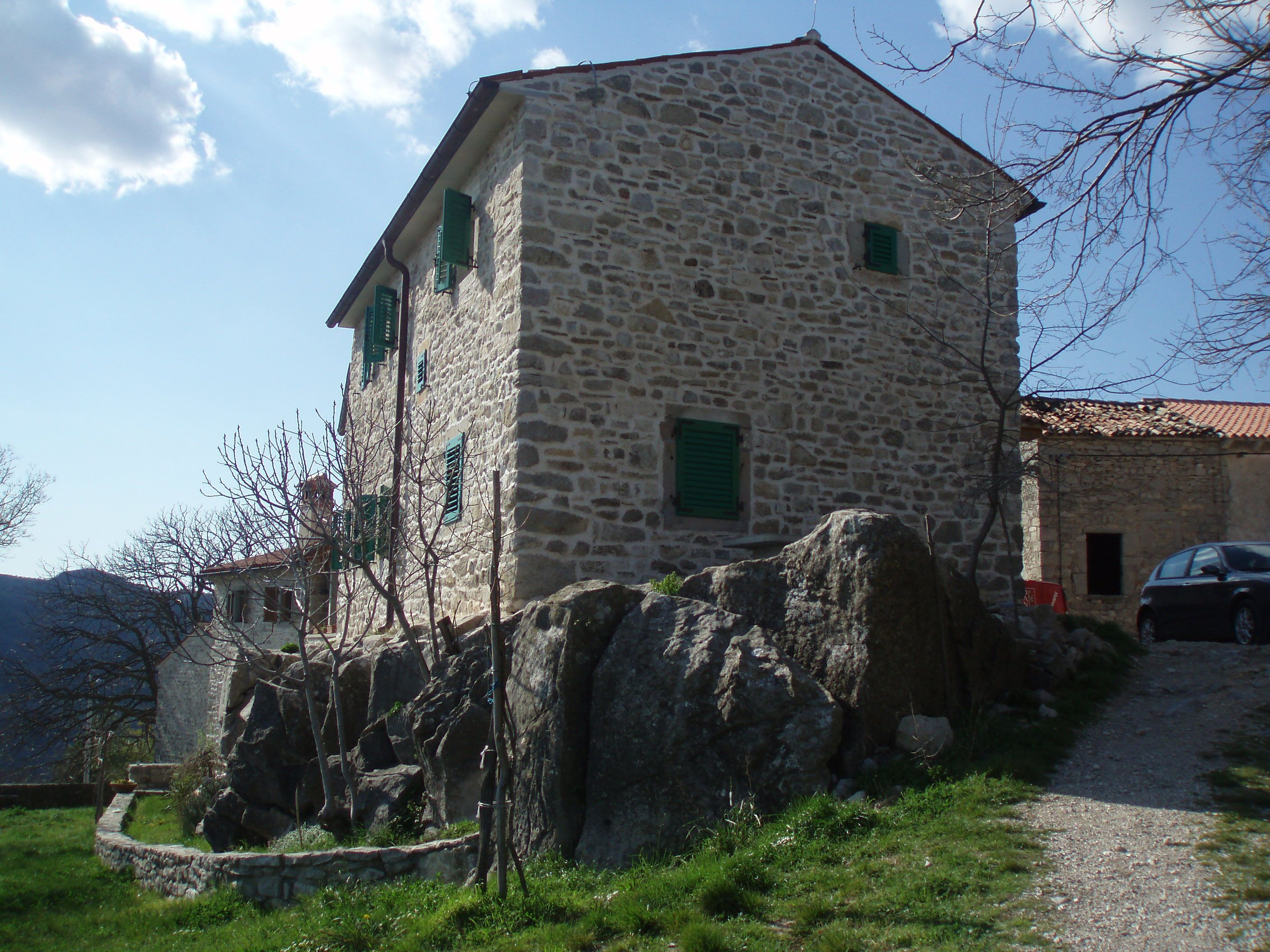

- Location within Croatia
- Country: Croatia
- County: Istria County
- Municipality: Lupoglav

Area
  - Total: 2.8 sq mi (7.2 km^{2})

Population (2021)
  - Total: 64
  - Density: 23/sq mi (8.9/km^{2})
- Time zone: UTC+1 (CET)
  - Summer (DST): UTC+2 (CEST)
- Postal code: 52434 Boljun
- Area code: 052

Boljun (Italian: Bogliuno) is a village in the municipality of Lupoglav, in Istria County, Croatia.

== Climate ==
From 1981 to 1989, the highest temperature recorded at the local weather station was 37.5 °C (99.5 °F), on 27 July 1983. The coldest temperature was −12.1 °C (10.2 °F), on 8 January 1985.

== Demographics ==
According to the 2021 census, its population was 64. In 2001, the village had 73 residents. In 1921, there were 1,018 residents of the commune of Boljun who used Italian as their habitual language, making up 31% of the population; 489 out of 723 residents of the village core were Italian speakers.

== See also ==
- List of Glagolitic inscriptions (16th century)
- Lists of Glagolitic inscriptions
