= Dolenja Vas pri Temenici =

Dolenja Vas pri Temenici Dolenja Vas (until 1953)
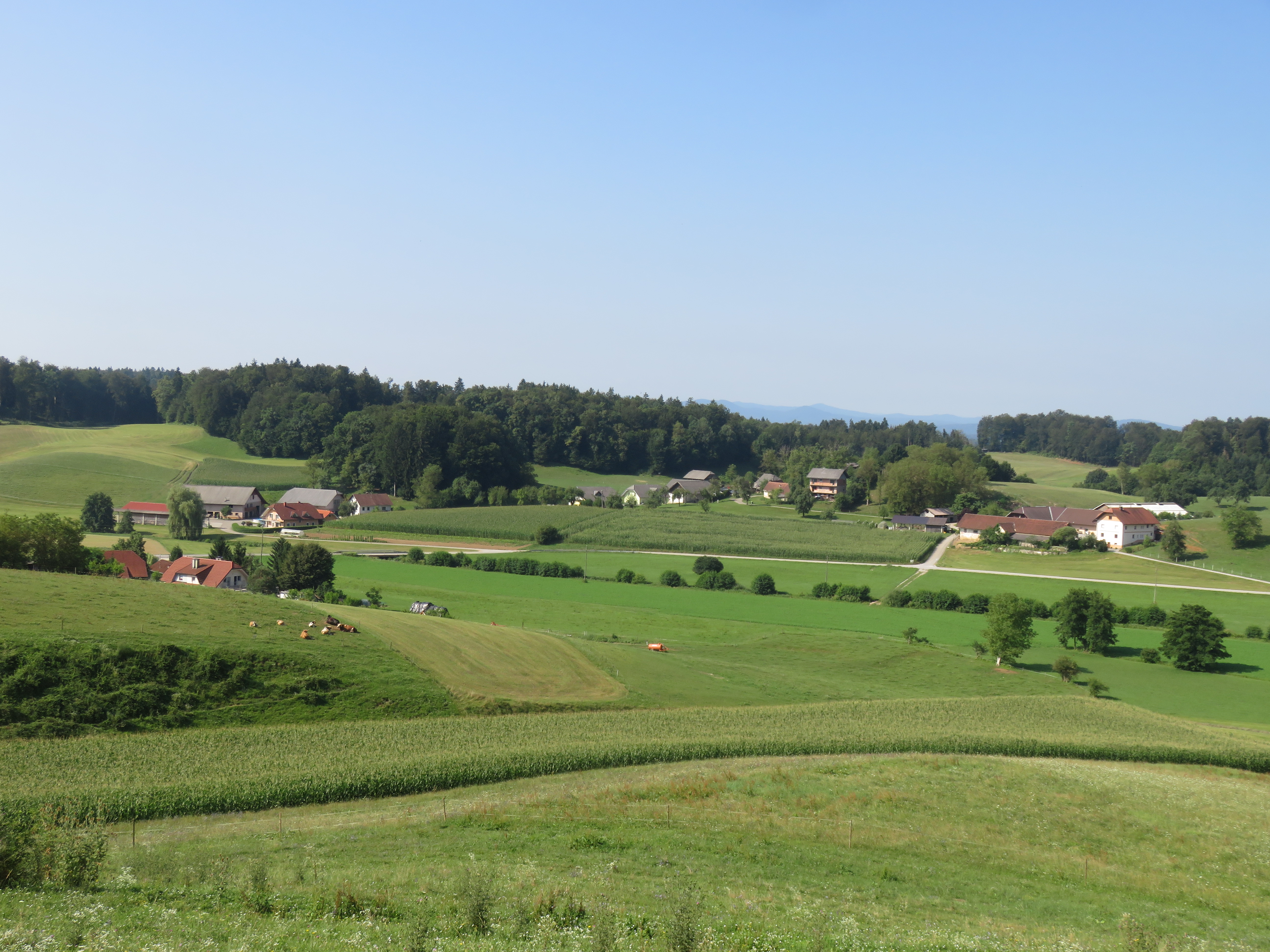

- Location in Slovenia
- Coordinates: 45°57′43.1″N 14°53′10.31″E
- Country: Slovenia
- Traditional region: Lower Carniola
- Statistical region: Central Slovenia
- Municipality: Ivančna Gorica

Area
  - Total: 0.43 km^{2} (0.17 sq mi)
- Elevation: 325.2 m (1,067 ft)

Population (2002)
  - Total: 16

Dolenja Vas pri Temenici (pronounced [dɔˈleːnja ˈʋaːs pɾi ˈteːmɛnitsi]; Slovene: Dolenja vas pri Temenici, German: Niederdorf) is a small settlement on the right bank of the Temenica River in the Municipality of Ivančna Gorica in central Slovenia. The area is part of the historical region of Lower Carniola and is included in the Central Slovenia Statistical Region.

== Name ==
The name of the settlement was changed from Dolenja vas to Dolenja vas pri Temenici in 1953. In the past the German name was Niederdorf.
