= Dolenja Vas, Lupoglav =

Village in Istria, Croatia

Dolenja Vas Villabassa
- Village
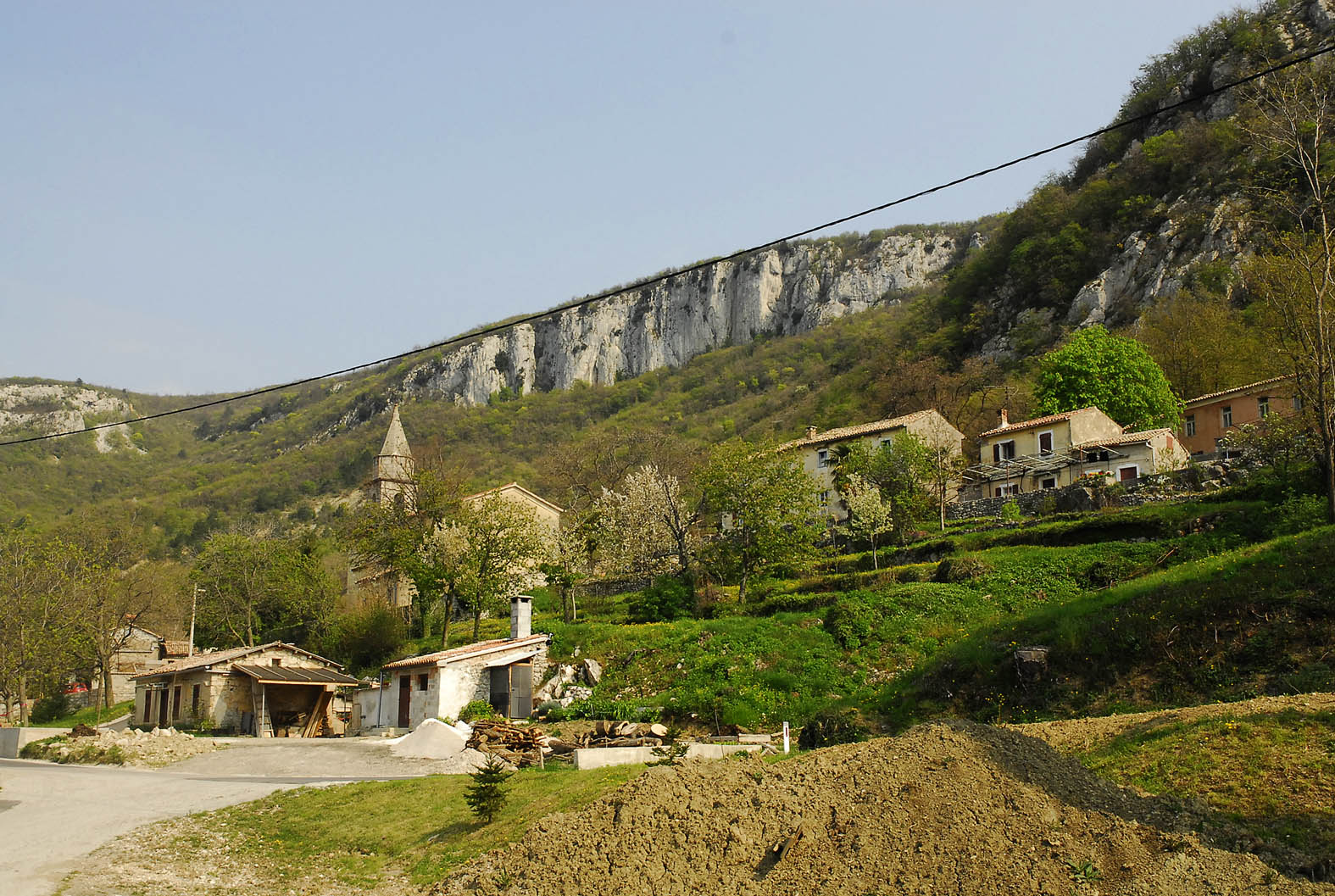

- Location within Croatia
- Country: Croatia
- County: Istria County
- Municipality: Lupoglav

Area
  - Total: 5.4 sq mi (14.1 km^{2})

Population (2021)
  - Total: 48
  - Density: 8.8/sq mi (3.4/km^{2})
- Time zone: UTC+1 (CET)
  - Summer (DST): UTC+2 (CEST)
- Postal code: 52434 Boljun
- Area code: 052

Dolenja Vas (Italian: Villabassa) is a village in the municipality of Lupoglav, in Istria County, Croatia.

== Demographics ==
According to the 2021 census, its population was 48. In 2001, the village had 82 residents.
