= Putini, Croatia =

Putini
- Village
- Location within Croatia
- Country: Croatia
- County: Istria County
- Municipality: Kanfanar

Area
  - Total: 0.50 sq mi (1.3 km^{2})

Population (2021)
  - Total: 85
  - Density: 170/sq mi (65/km^{2})
- Time zone: UTC+1 (CET)
  - Summer (DST): UTC+2 (CEST)
- Postal code: 52352 Kanfanar
- Area code: 052

Putini is a village in the municipality of Kanfanar in Istria, Croatia.

== Demographics ==
According to the 2021 census, its population was 85.
