= Vranja =

Village in Istria, Croatia

Vranja Aurania
- Village
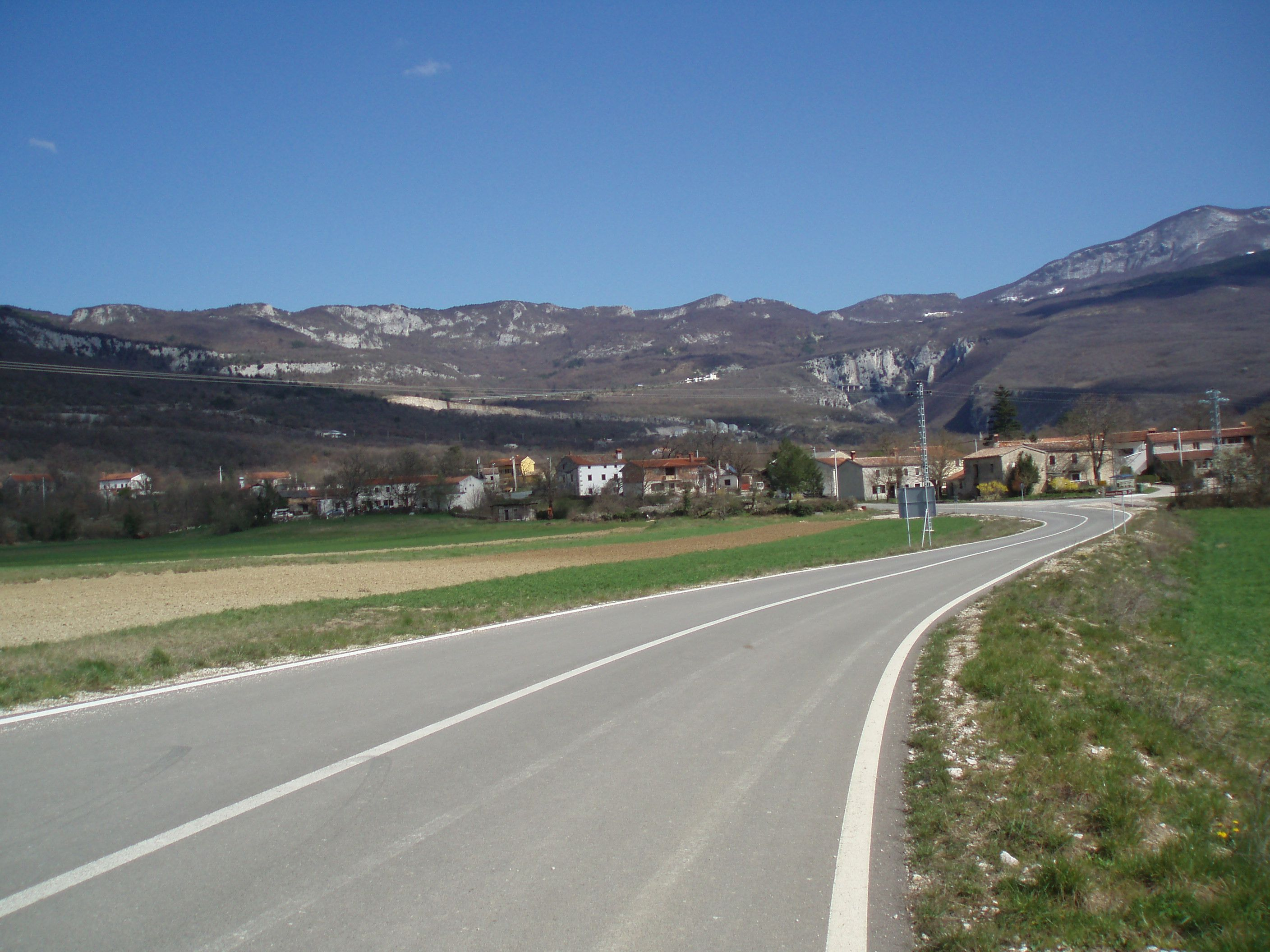

- Location within Croatia
- Country: Croatia
- County: Istria County
- Municipality: Lupoglav

Area
  - Total: 6.6 sq mi (17.2 km^{2})

Population (2021)
  - Total: 92
  - Density: 14/sq mi (5.3/km^{2})
- Time zone: UTC+1 (CET)
  - Summer (DST): UTC+2 (CEST)
- Postal code: 52434 Boljun
- Area code: 052

Vranja (Italian: Aurania) is a village in the municipality of Lupoglav, in Istria County, Croatia.

== Demographics ==
According to the 2021 census, its population was 92. In 2011, the village had 98 residents.
