= Vehicle classification in Croatia =

There are two forms of vehicle classification in Croatia. Vehicles are classified by categories in the driving license and by categories for toll highways.

== Driving license classification ==
As an EU member, Croatia has a Driving license scheme partly compatible with the European driving licence one.

Category	Description
AM	Mopeds and motor cultivators
A1	Motorcycles with or without a sidecar, of an engine capacity not exceeding 125 cm³ and of an engine power not exceeding 11 kW and a power-to-weight ratio not exceeding 0,1 kW / kg. Three-wheeled motor vehicles with a power not exceeding 15 kW.
A2	Motorcycles with or without a sidecar whose power does not exceed 35 kW and whose power-to-weight ratio does not exceed 0.2 kW / kg, and do not originate from vehicles whose power is twice as much and more
A	Motorcycles with or without sidecar. Motor vehicles on three wheels whose power is greater than 15 kW. The minimum age for category A is 24 years, or 20 years if the driver has a driver's license to drive a category A2 vehicle for at least two years. The minimum age for a three-wheeled A-category vehicle is 21 years.
B	Motor vehicles with a maximum authorized mass not exceeding 3,500 kg and designed and constructed for the carriage of not more than 8 passengers, excluding the driver's seat; motor vehicles of this category may be combined with a trailer with a maximum authorized mass not exceeding 750 kg. Without prejudice to the provisions of the type-approval regulations of the vehicle in question, motor vehicles in this category may be combined with a trailer having a maximum authorized mass of over 750 kg, provided that the maximum authorized mass of this vehicle combination does not exceed 4,250 kg. In the event that the maximum permissible mass of such a combination of vehicles exceeds 3,500 kg, the driver may drive such a combination only after passing the exam for that combination of vehicles in the subject Vehicle Management.
BE	A combination of a vehicle consisting of a category B towing vehicle and a trailer, where the maximum permissible mass of the trailer does not exceed 3,500 kg.
C1	Having a maximum permissible mass exceeding 3,500 kg but not exceeding 7,500 kg and designed and constructed for the carriage of a maximum of eight passengers with a driver; motor vehicles in this category may be combined with a trailer with a maximum authorized mass not exceeding 750 kg.
C1E	A combination of a vehicle consisting of a towing vehicle of category C1 and its trailer having a maximum permissible mass exceeding 750 kg, provided that the maximum permissible mass of the vehicle combination does not exceed 12,000 kg. A combination of a vehicle consisting of a category B towing vehicle and its trailer having a maximum permissible mass exceeding 3,500 kg, provided that the maximum permissible mass of the vehicle combination does not exceed 12,000 kg.
C	Motor vehicles with a maximum permissible mass exceeding 7,500 kg.
CE	A combination of a vehicle consisting of a category C towing vehicle and a trailer with a maximum authorized mass of more than 750 kg.
D1	Motor vehicles designed and constructed for the carriage of not more than 16 passengers per driver and having a maximum length not exceeding 8 m; motor vehicles of this category may be combined with a trailer with a maximum authorized mass not exceeding 750 kg.
D1E	A combination of a vehicle consisting of a towing vehicle D1 and its trailer having a maximum permissible mass exceeding 750 kg.
D	Motor vehicles designed and constructed for the carriage of more than eight passengers with a driver; motor vehicles of this category may be combined with a trailer with a maximum authorized mass not exceeding 750 kg.
DE	A combination of a vehicle consisting of a category D towing vehicle and its trailer having a maximum permissible mass exceeding 750 kg.
F	Tractors with or without trailers
G	Working machines
H	Trams

== Toll categories ==
Vehicles on motorways are classified into five price classes or categories in accordance with the Ordinance on the amount of tolls on public roads and the Decision on the amount of tolls on motorways issued by the Ministry of Sea, Transport and Infrastructure and published by Croatian Association of Toll Motorways Concessionaires(HUKA).

Category	Includes
IA	Motorcycles, motor tricycles and quadricycles
I	Motor vehicles with two axles, height up to 1.90 m
II	Motor vehicles with two axles higher than 1.90 m, with a maximum permissible mass not exceeding 3500 kg; Motor vehicles with two axles, less than 1.90 m high, towing a trailer, regardless of the number of axles and the height of the trailer
III	Motor vehicles with two or three axles, maximum permissible mass over 3500 kg; Motor vehicles with two axles, maximum permissible mass over 3500 kg, towing a trailer with one axle; Motor vehicles, referred to a II category, towing a trailer, regardless of the number of axles of the trailer
IV	Motor vehicles with four or more axles, maximum permissible mass exceeding 3500 kg; Two-axle motor vehicles, with a maximum permissible mass exceeding 3500 kg, towing a trailer with two or more axles; Motor vehicles with three axles, maximum permissible mass over 3500 kg, towing a trailer, regardless of the number of axles of the trailer
