= Dolenja Vas, Cerknica =

Dolenja Vas
- Village
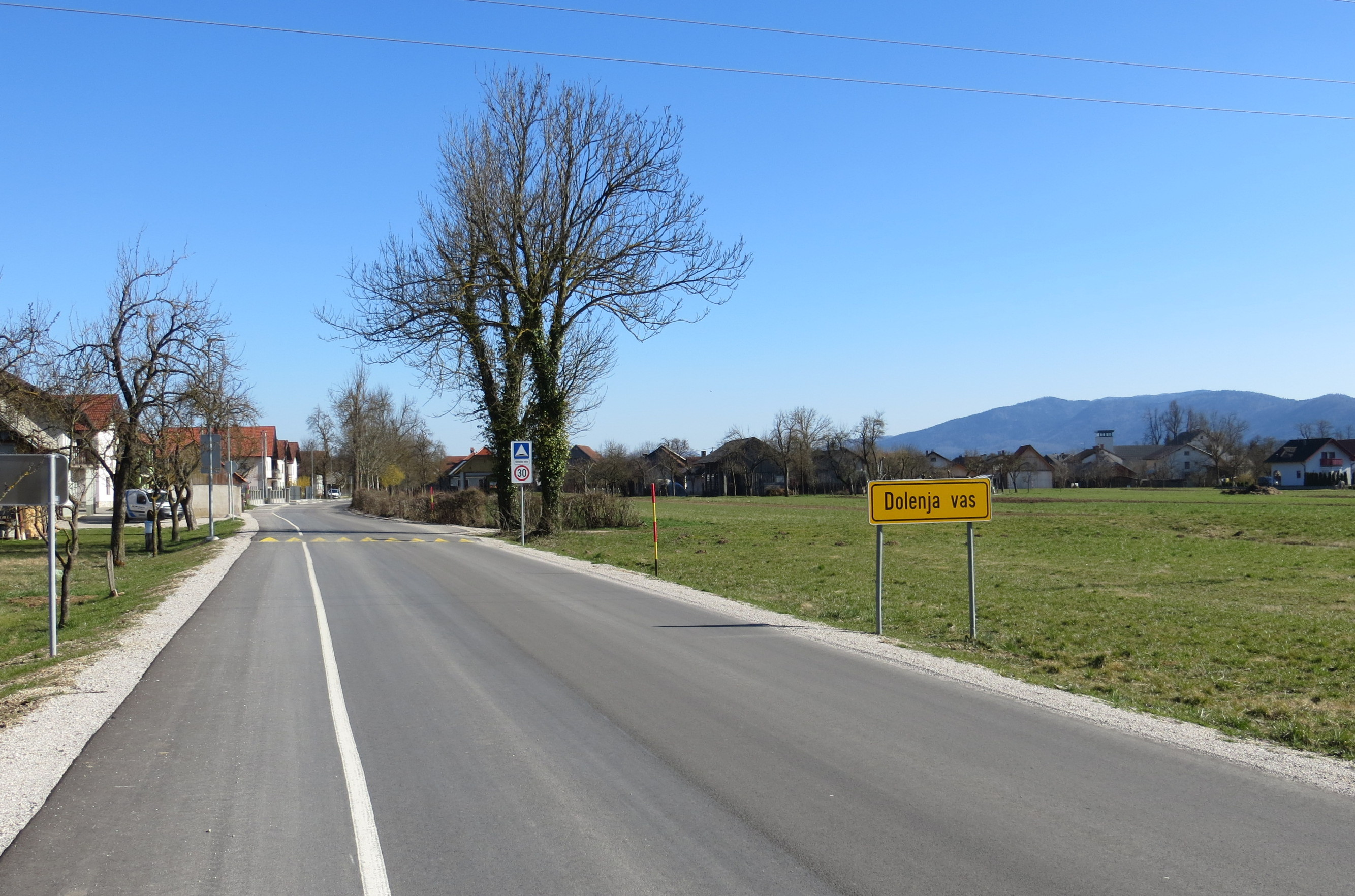

- Location in Slovenia
- Coordinates: 45°47′13.08″N 14°20′52.47″E
- Country: Slovenia
- Traditional region: Inner Carniola
- Statistical region: Littoral–Inner Carniola
- Municipality: Cerknica

Area
  - Total: 5.9 km^{2} (2.3 sq mi)
- Elevation: 554.6 m (1,820 ft)

Population (2020)
  - Total: 499
  - Density: 85/km^{2} (220/sq mi)

Dolenja Vas (pronounced [dɔˈleːnja ˈʋaːs]; Slovene: Dolenja vas, German: Niederdorf) is a village southwest of Cerknica in the Inner Carniola region of Slovenia.

== Name ==
The name Dolenja vas literally means 'lower village'. Dolenja vas and names like it are quite common in Slovenia and other Slavic countries, and they indicate that the settlement lay at a lower elevation than nearby settlements. It lies about 20 meters (66 ft) lower than neighboring Cerknica. The village was known as Niederdorf in German in the past.

== History ==
Ancient settlement of the area is testified by the discovery of the remains of a Hallstatt- or Roman-era fortress on Tržišče Hill above the village. The site included a large cache of weapons. An Urnfield burial site was discovered on the southeast slope of the hill and was excavated in 1877. Southwest of this there was a second fortress, the embankments of which are well preserved.

=== Mass grave ===
Dolenja Vas is the site of a mass grave associated with the Second World War. The Balant Valleys Shaft Mass Grave (Slovene: Grobišče Brezno v Balantovih dolinah) is located southwest of the settlement. The narrow shaft has been explored to a depth of 25 m (82 ft) and contains unidentified remains.

== Church ==
The local church, built southwest of the settlement, is dedicated to Saint Lawrence and belongs to the Parish of Cerknica. The church dates from 1616 and contains a gilded altar dedicated to Saint Margaret.

== Notable people ==
Notable people that were born or lived in Dolenja Vas include:

- Lojze Perko (1909–1980), artist
- Franjo Sterle (1889–1930), painter
