= D302 road =

Road in Croatia

D302 state road

Route information
- Length: 11.8 km (7.3 mi)

Major junctions
- From: D21 and D48 junction near Baderna
- A9 in Baderna interchange
- To: Poreč

Location
- Country: Croatia
- Counties: Istria
- Major cities: Poreč, Baderna

Highway system
- Highways in Croatia

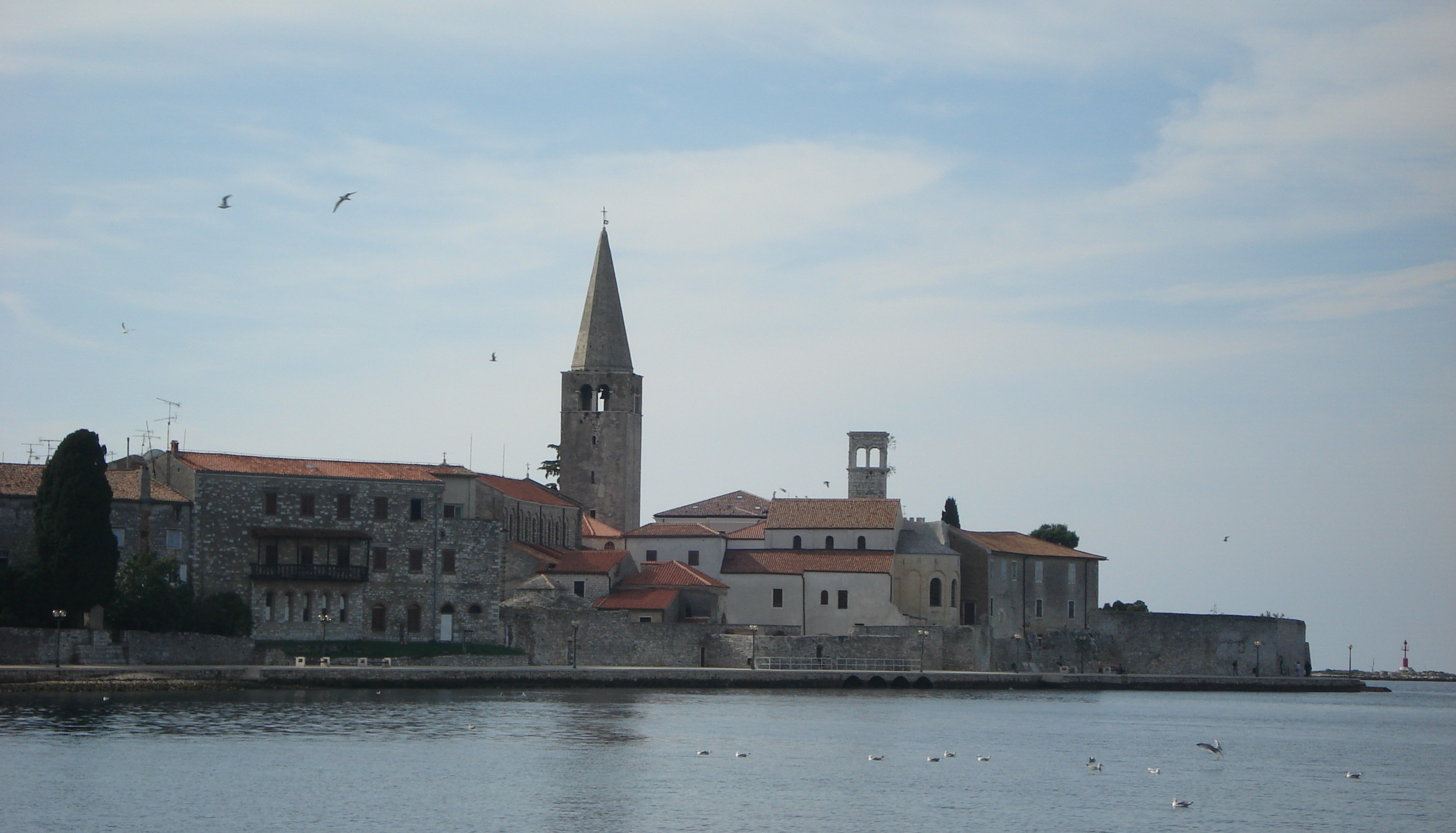
Poreč, at the western terminus of D302

D302 is a state road connecting A9 with Poreč and Baderna. The road is 11.8 km long.

As with all state roads in Croatia, the D302 is managed and maintained by Hrvatske ceste, state owned company.

== Traffic volume ==
Traffic is regularly counted and reported by Hrvatske ceste, operator of the road. Substantial variations between annual (AADT) and summer (ASDT) traffic volumes are attributed to the fact that the road connects A9 motorway carrying substantial tourist traffic to Poreč, a major summer resort.

D302 traffic volume
Road	Counting site	AADT	ASDT	Notes
D302	2711 Žbandaj	8,811	12,745	The only published traffic counting site on D303.

== Road junctions and populated areas ==
D302 junctions/populated areas
Type	Slip roads/Notes
	D21 to Baderna and Sveti Lovreč. D48 to Tinjan. Eastern terminus of the road. Eastbound D302 traffic defaults to D48.
	to Baderna interchange: A9 motorway to Pula (to the south) and to Umag (to the north).
	Ladrovići
	Žbandaj; Ž5072 to Lovreč (D21); L50050 to Višnjan
	Buići
	L50089 to Mušalež
	Vrvari; L50088 to Veleniki
	Putini
	Poreč; Ž5002 to Novigrad to the north and to Funtana to the south. Western terminus of the road.

== See also ==
- Istrian Y
