= Nova Vas =

Nova Vas may refer to

In Croatia:

- Nova Vas, Brtonigla, a village in the Municipality of Brtonigla
- Nova Vas, Kršan, a village in the Municipality of Kršan
- Nova Vas, Poreč, a settlement in the town of Poreč

In Slovenia:

- Nova Vas (district), a district of the City Municipality of Celje and a neighborhood of the city of Celje
- Nova Vas, Bloke, the central settlement of the Municipality of Bloke, southern Slovenia
- Nova Vas, Ivančna Gorica, a settlement in the Municipality of Ivančna Gorica, southeastern Slovenia
- Nova Vas, Maribor, a suburb of the city of Maribor, northwestern Slovenia
- Nova Vas, Miren-Kostanjevica, a settlement in the Municipality of Miren-Kostanjevica, southwestern Slovenia
- Nova Vas, Preddvor, a settlement in the Municipality of Preddvor, northwestern Slovenia
- Nova Vas, Sežana, a settlement in the Municipality of Sežana, southwestern Slovenia
- Nova Vas nad Dragonjo, a settlement in the Municipality of Piran, southwestern Slovenia
- Nova Vas ob Sotli, a settlement in the Municipality of Brežice, southeastern Slovenia
- Nova Vas pod Rifnikom, a former settlement in the Municipality of Šentjur, eastern Slovenia
- Nova Vas pri Jelšanah, a settlement in the Municipality of Ilirska Bistrica, southwestern Slovenia
- Nova Vas pri Konjicah, a settlement in the Municipality of Slovenske Konjice, northeastern Slovenia
- Nova Vas pri Lescah, a settlement in the Municipality of Radovljica, northwestern Slovenia
- Nova Vas pri Markovcih, a settlement in the Municipality of Markovci, northeastern Slovenia
- Nova Vas pri Mokricah, a settlement in the Municipality of Brežice, southwestern Slovenia
- Nova Vas pri Šmarju, a settlement in the Municipality of Šmarje pri Jelšah, eastern Slovenia
- Nova Vas pri Žireh, a former settlement in the Municipality of Žiri, western Slovenia
- Spodnja Nova Vas, a settlement in the Municipality of Slovenska Bistrica, northeastern Slovenia
- Stara Nova Vas, a settlement in the Municipality of Križevci, northeastern Slovenia
- Zgornja Nova Vas, a settlement in the Municipality of Slovenska Bistrica, northeastern Slovenia
