= Mihatovići =

Mihatovići may refer to:

- Mihatovići, Bosnia and Herzegovina, a village near Tuzla
- Mihatovići, Croatia, a village near Poreč
