= Cusi =

Cusi or Cusí may refer to:

== People ==
- Alfonso Cusi (born 1949), Filipino businessman
- Allan Ferdinand V. Cusi, Filipino admiral
- Bruna Cusí (born 1986), Spanish actress
- Cusi Cram (born 1967), American playwright
- Cusi Huarcay, Princess and queen consort of the Inca Empire
- Cusi Yupanqui, or Pachacuti, Sapa Inca of the Inca Empire
- Diego Cusi Huamán, 17th-century Peruvian painter
- José Cusí (1934–2026), Spanish sports shooter
- Rafael Arenillo Cusi, Filipino artist
- Titu Cusi (1529–1571), Sapa Inca or Inca ruler

== Places ==
- Čuši, Croatia
- Ćusi, Croatia
- Cusi Cusi, Argentina

== Other ==
- Centro Universitario Sportivo Italiano
