= BUIC =

BUIC or Buić could refer to:

- Back Up Interceptor Control, a former air defense command and control system for North American Air Defense
- Bangkok University International College
- Birmingham University Imaging Centre
- Boston University India Club
- Jagoda Buić (1930–2022), a Croatian visual artist

== See also ==
- Buići (disambiguation)
