= Jasenovica =

Jasenovica may refer to:

- Jasenovica, Istria County, a village near Poreč, Croatia
- Jasenovica, Karlovac County, a village near Ribnik, Croatia
