= Dračevac =

Dračevac may refer to:

- Dračevac, Istria County, a village near Poreč, Croatia
- Dračevac, Zadar, a village near Zadar, Croatia
- Dračevac Ninski, a village near Poličnik, Croatia
- Dračevac, Split, a part of Mejaši, a section of Split, Croatia
