= Poreč =

Poreč Parenzo Parenso
- Town
- Town of Poreč; Grad Poreč; Città di Parenzo
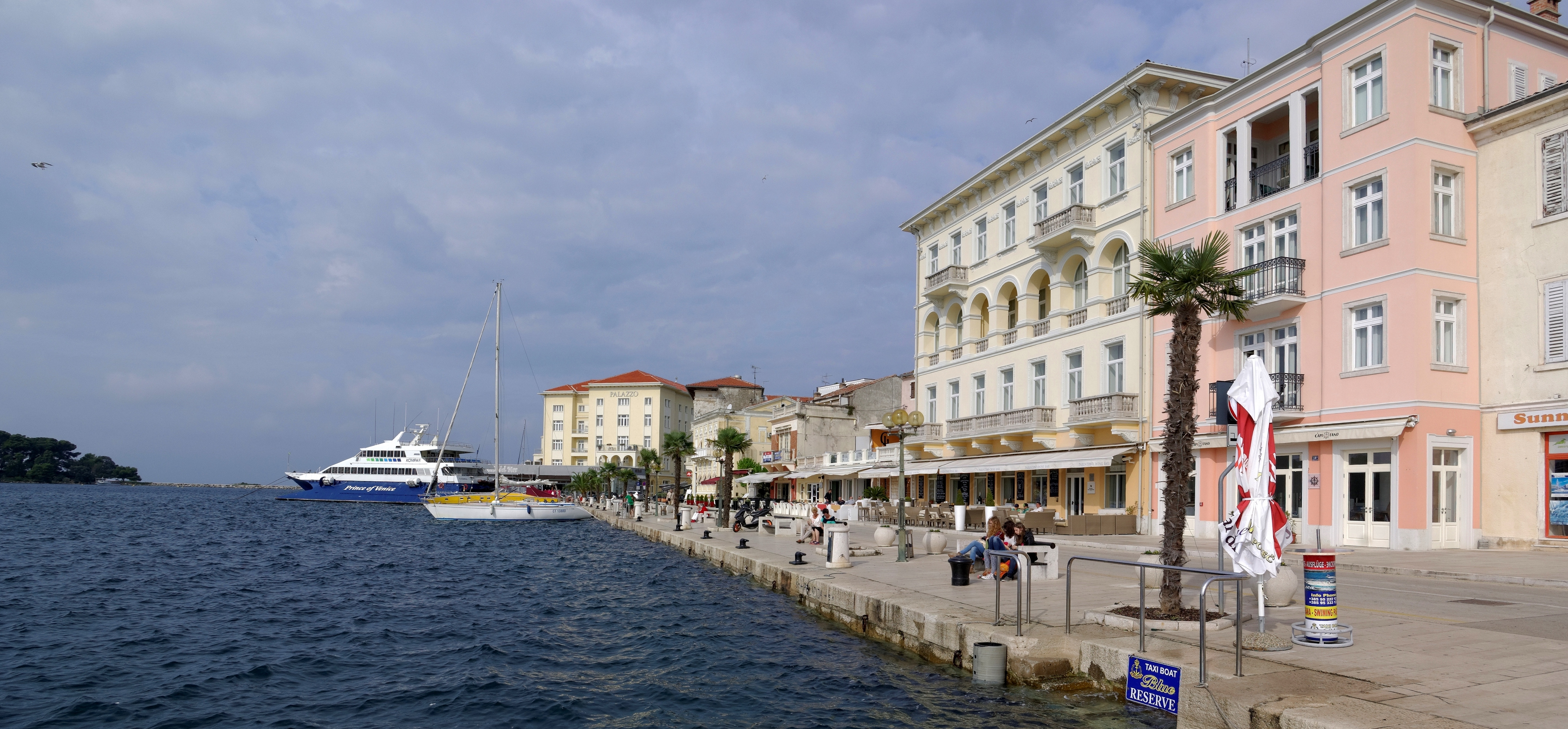
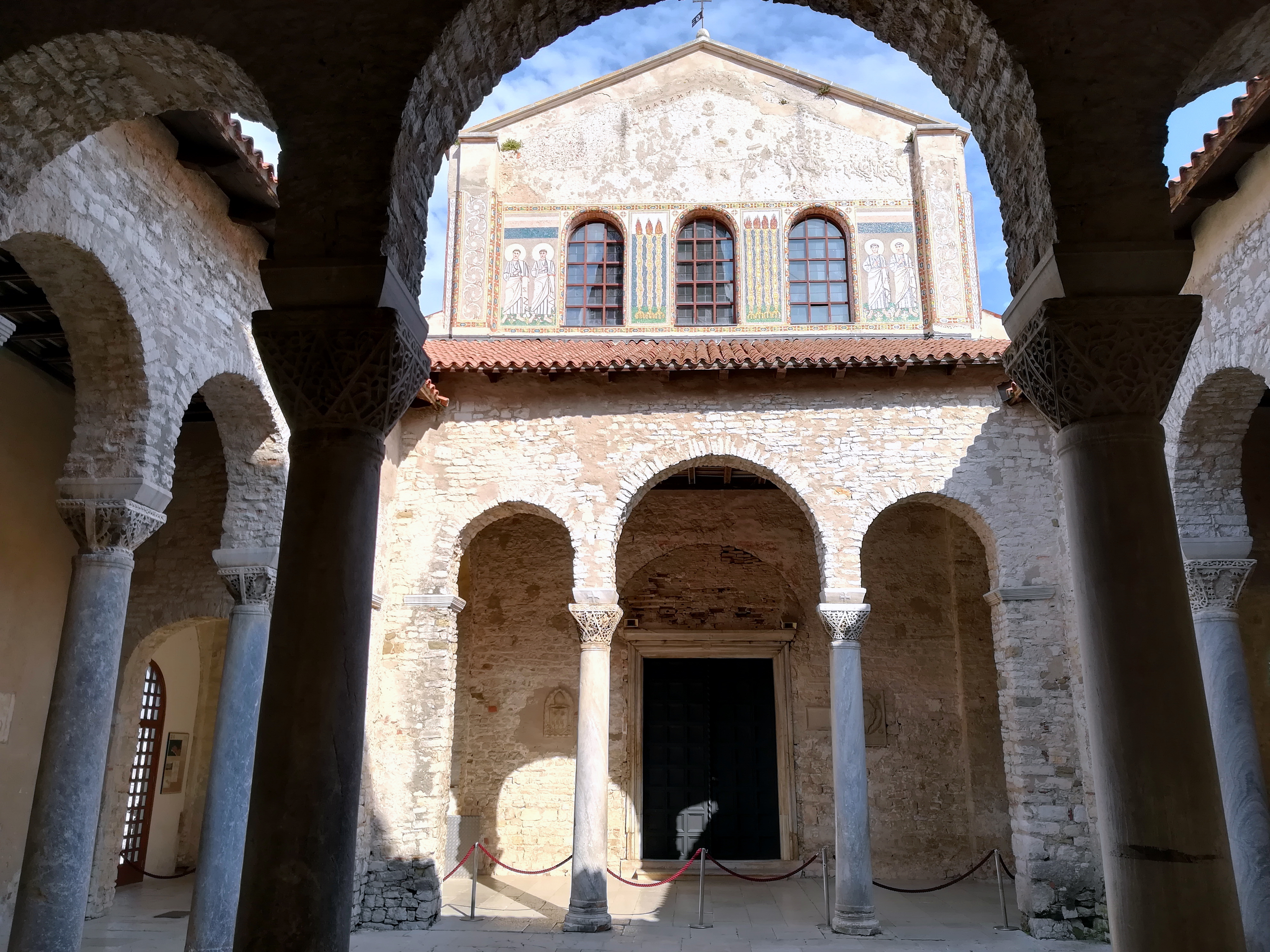
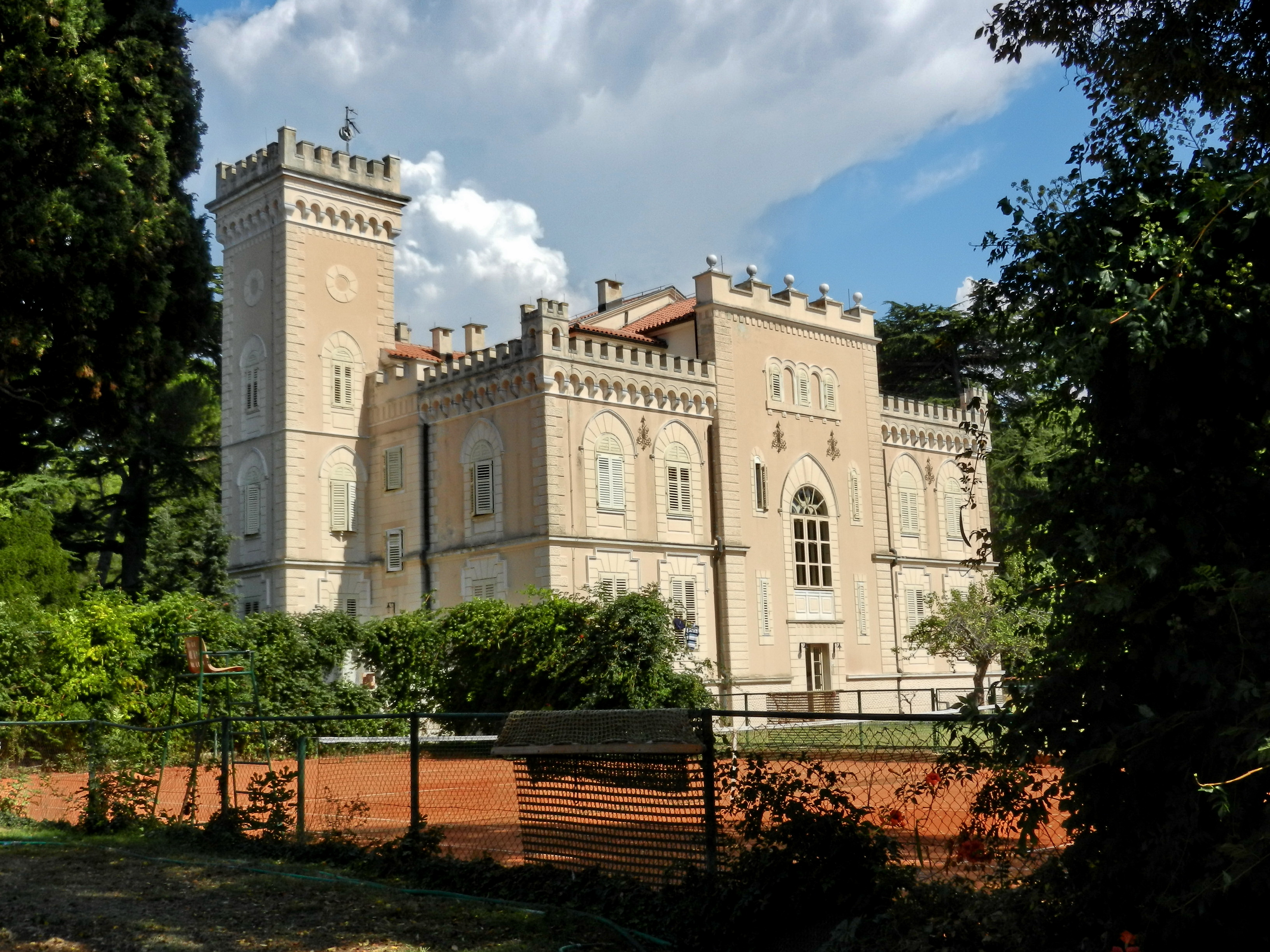
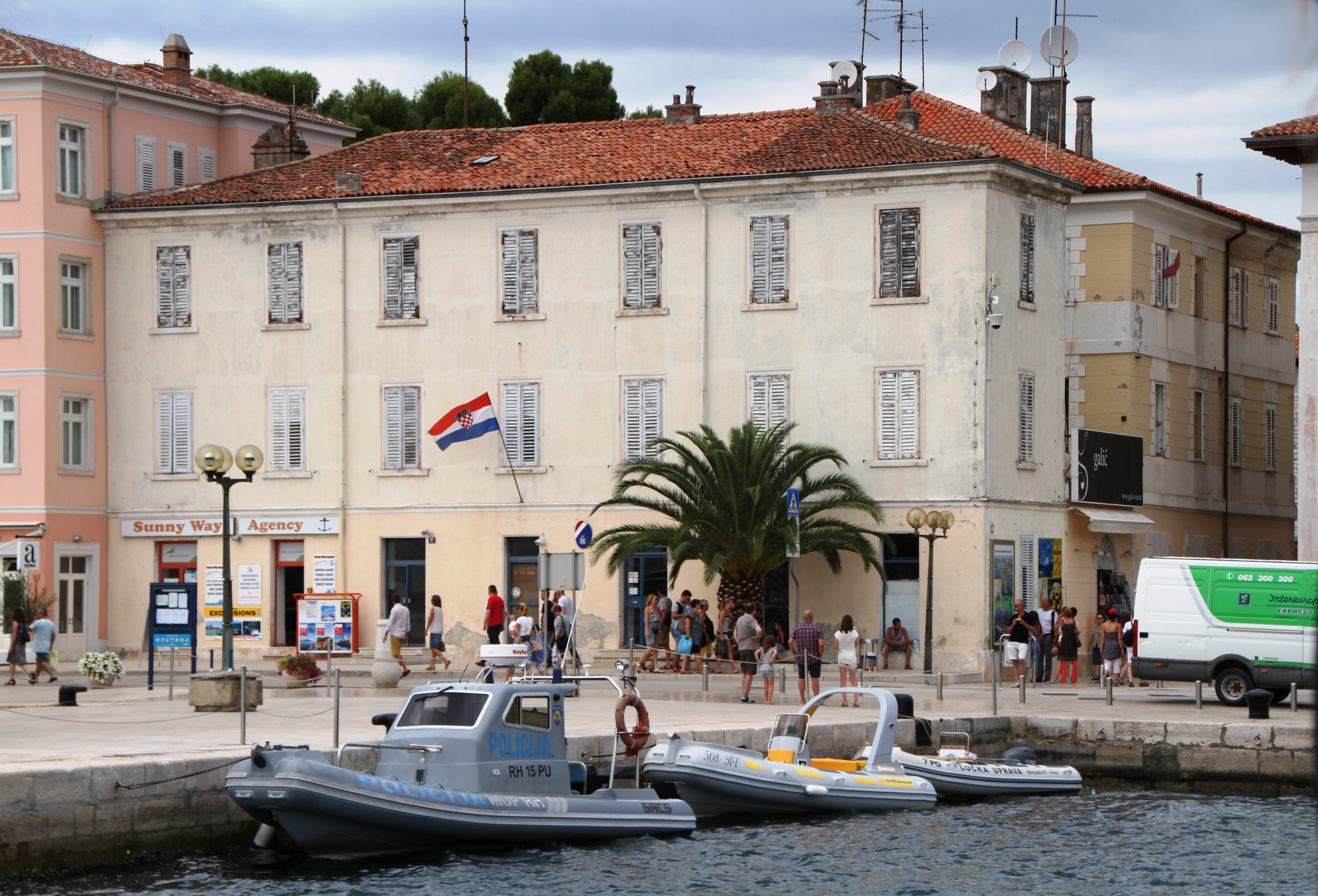
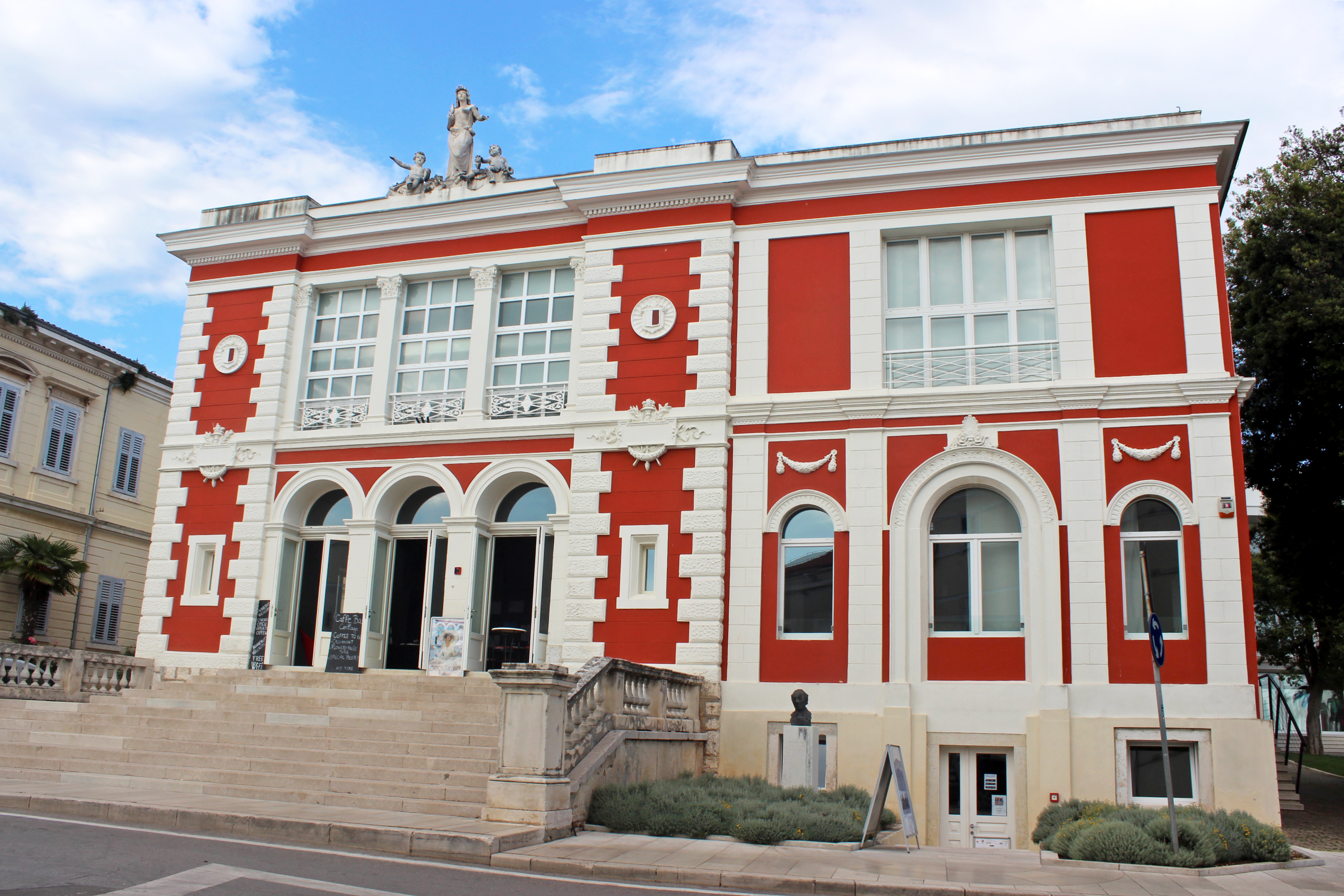
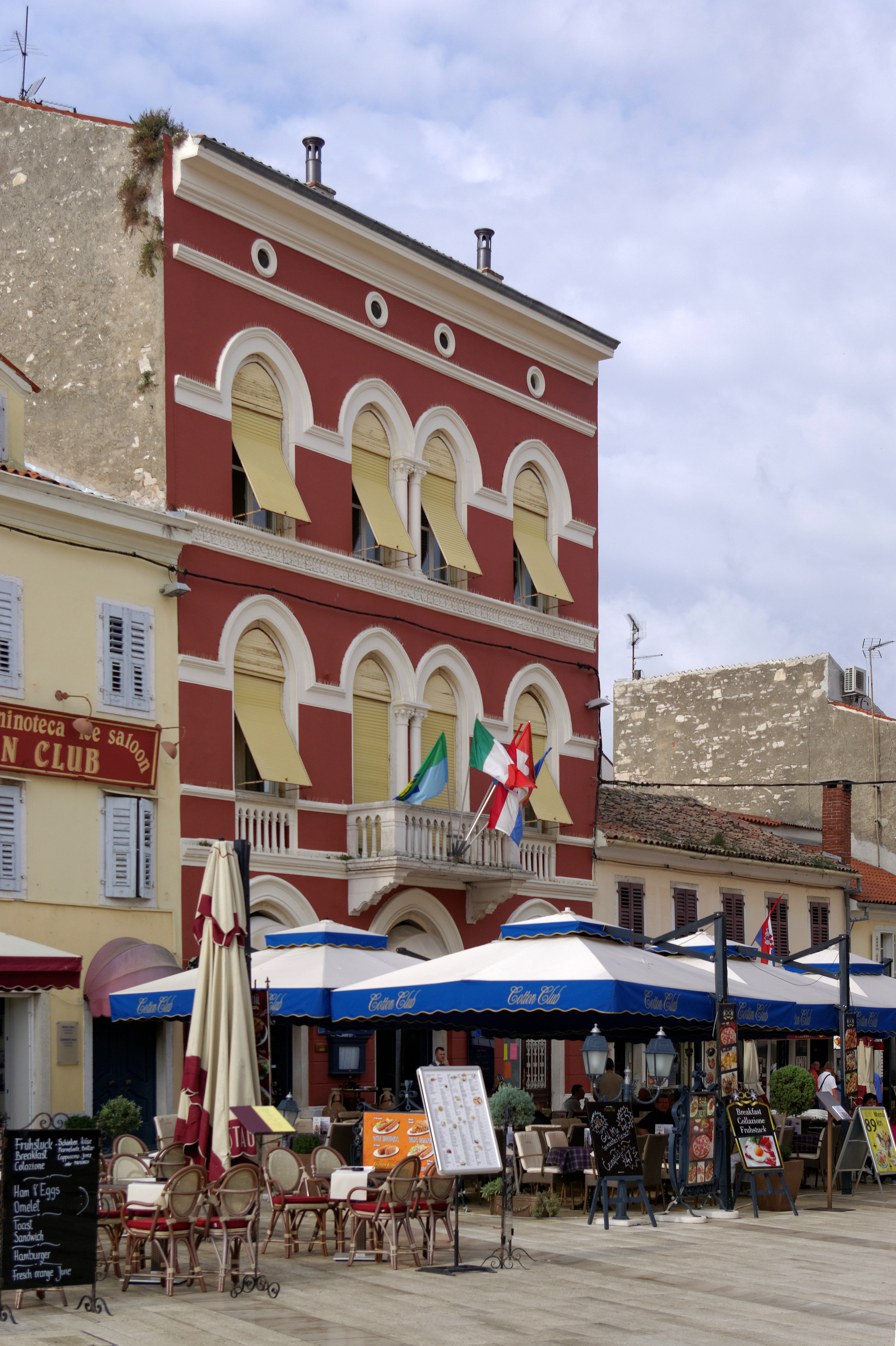
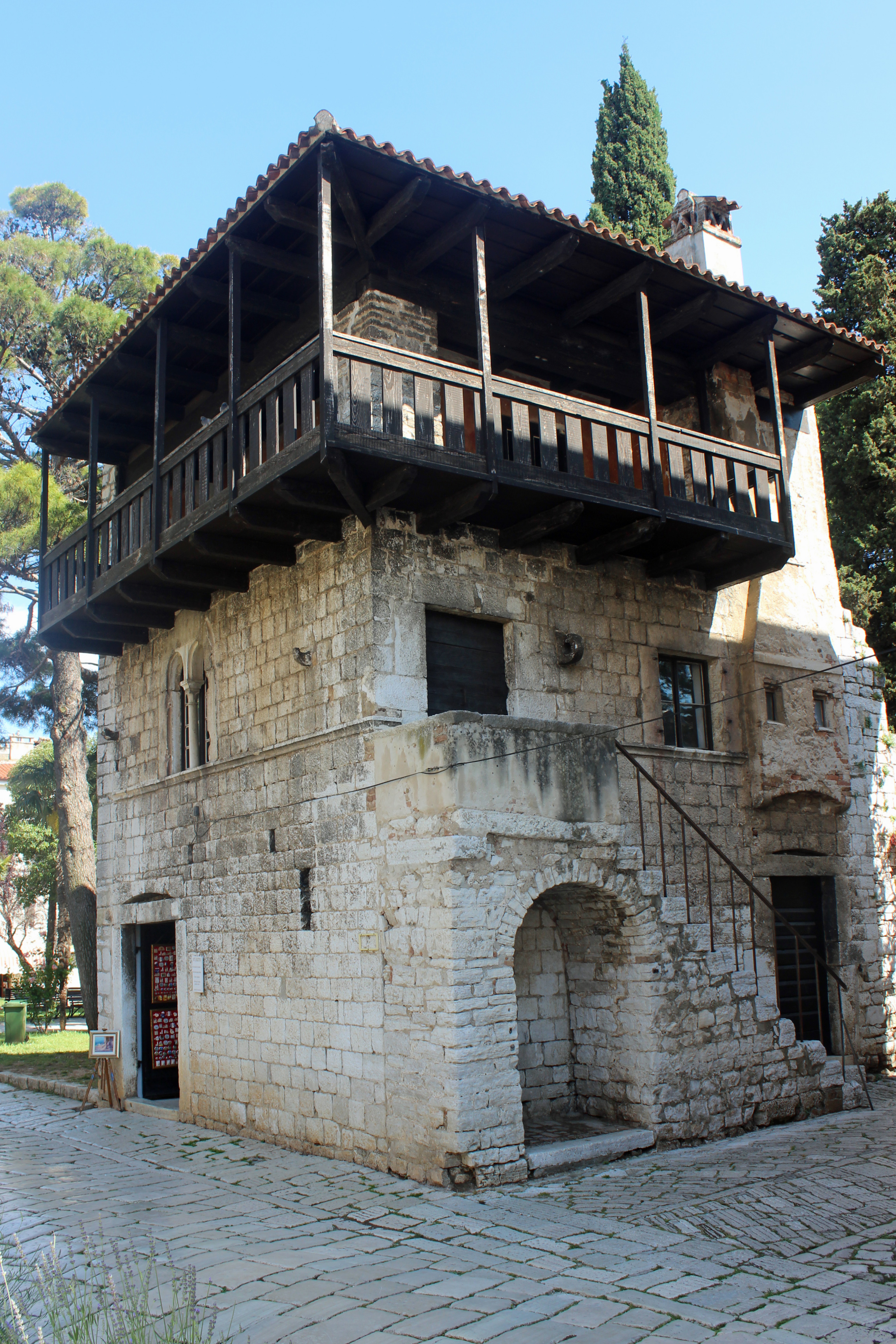
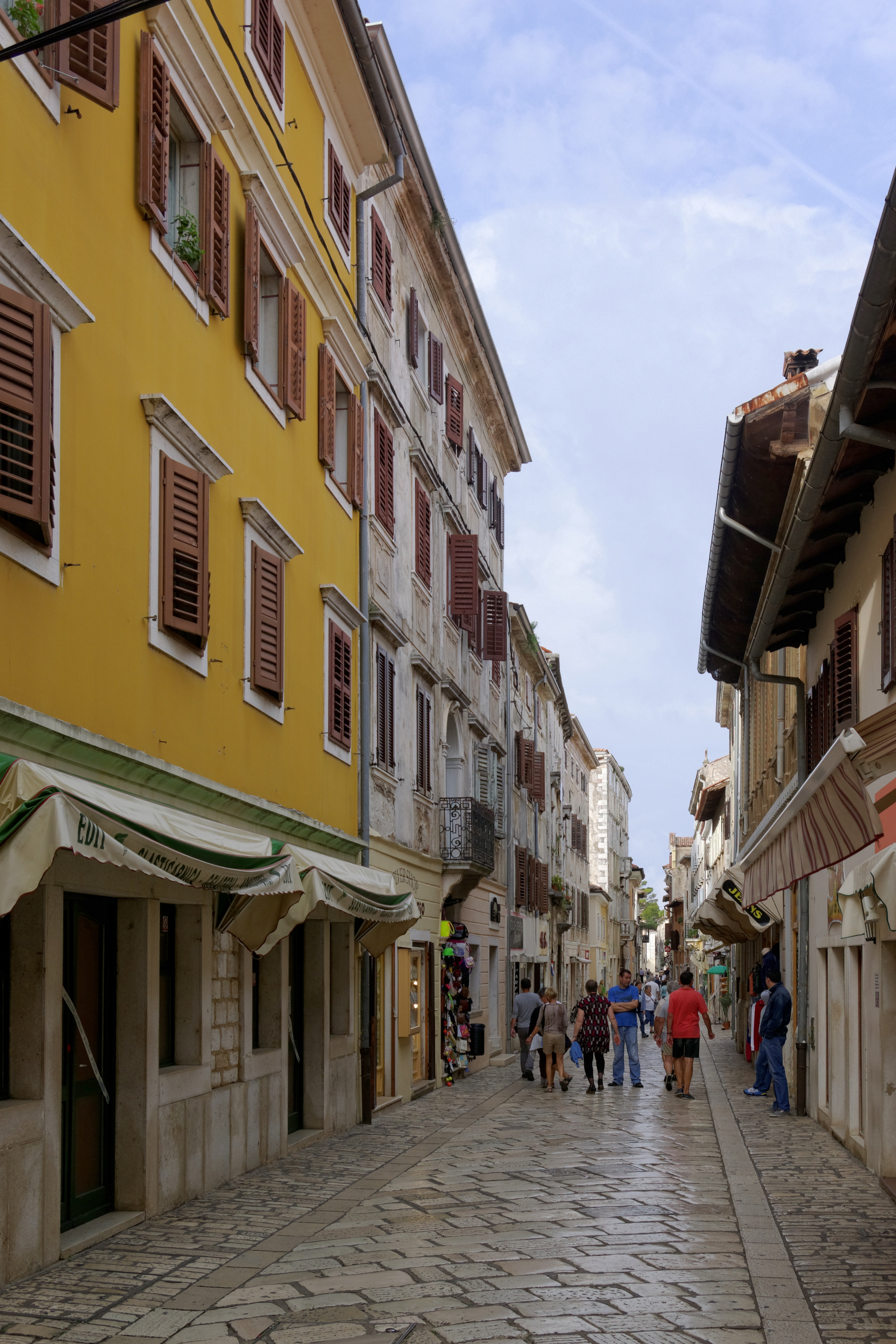
- Poreč skyline, Euphrasian Basilica, Isabella Castle on St. Nicholas island, Poreč Port authority, Poreč Theatre and old town

- Flag

- Location within Croatia
- Coordinates: 45°13′38″N 13°35′45″E
- Country: Croatia
- Region: Istria
- County: Istria County

Government
  - Mayor: Loris Peršurić (IDS)
  - City Council: 17 members: • IDS (9); • SDP, HSS, HNS, HSLS (3); • HDZ (1); • HSU (1); • ŽZ (1); • Independents (2)

Area
  - Town: 111.7 km^{2} (43.1 sq mi)
  - Urban: 14.3 km^{2} (5.5 sq mi)
- Elevation: 29 m (95 ft)

Population (2021)
  - Town: 16,607
  - Density: 148.7/km^{2} (385.1/sq mi)
  - Urban: 8,841
  - Urban density: 618/km^{2} (1,600/sq mi)
- Time zone: UTC+1 (CET)
  - Summer (DST): UTC+2 (CEST)
- Postal code: 52 440
- Area code: 052
- Website: porec.hr

Poreč (pronounced [ˈpɔrɛtʃ]; Italian: Parenzo; known also by several alternative names) is a town and municipality on the western coast of the Istrian peninsula, in Istria County, west Croatia. Its major landmark is the 6th-century Euphrasian Basilica, which was designated a UNESCO World Heritage Site in 1997.

The town is almost 2,000 years old, and is set around a harbour protected from the sea by the small island of Sveti Nikola. Its population of approximately 12,000 resides mostly on the outskirts, while the wider Poreč area has a population of approximately 16,600 inhabitants. The municipal area covers 142 square kilometres (55 sq mi), with the 37 kilometres (23 miles) long shoreline stretching from the Mirna River near Novigrad (Cittanova) to Funtana (Fontane) and Vrsar (Orsera) in the south.

== Names ==
Historically, Poreč or Parenzo has been known as Latin: Parens or Parentium, Ancient Greek: Πάρενθος, romanized: Párenthos and Venetian: Parenso.

== History ==
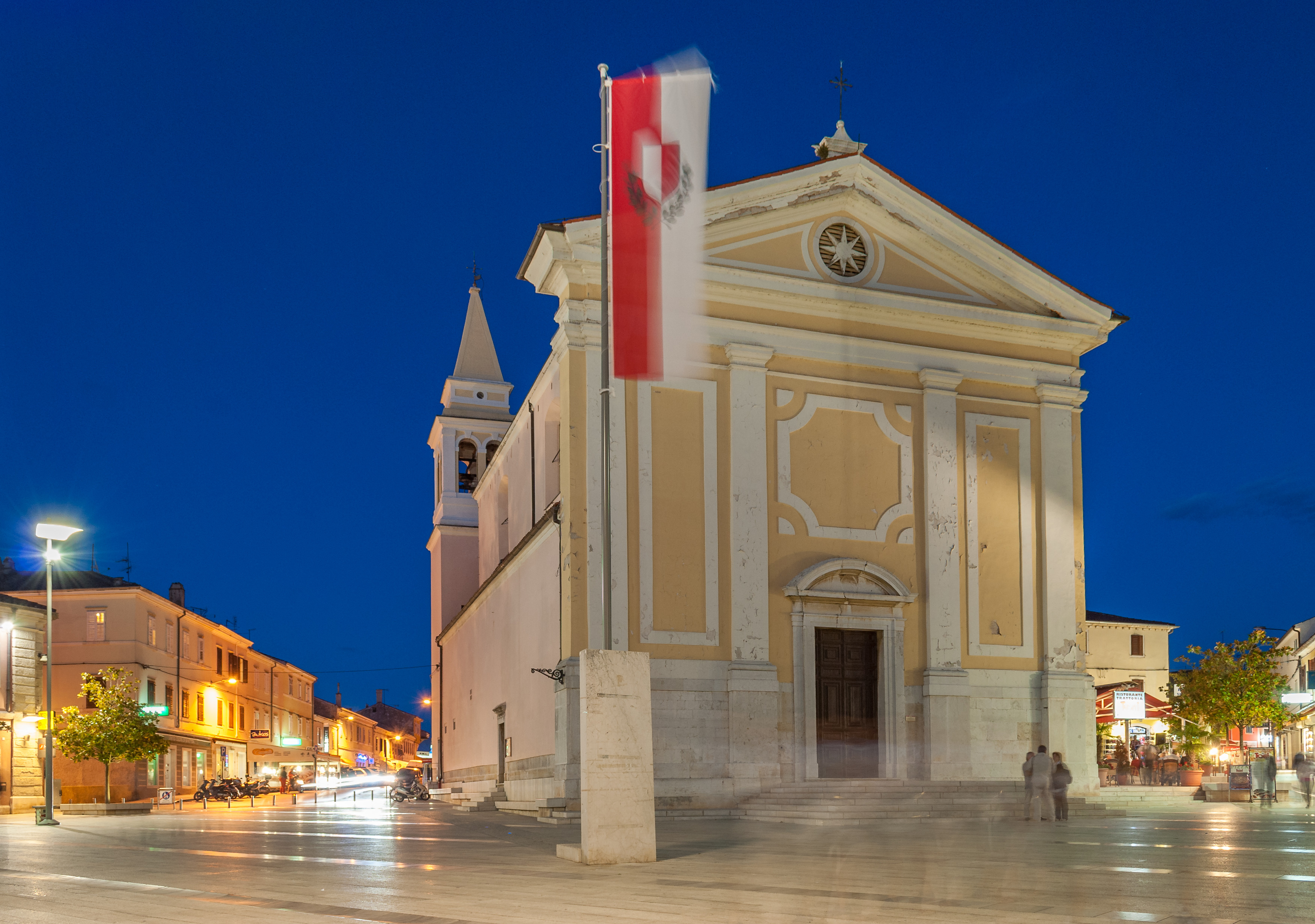
Church of Our Lady of the Angels

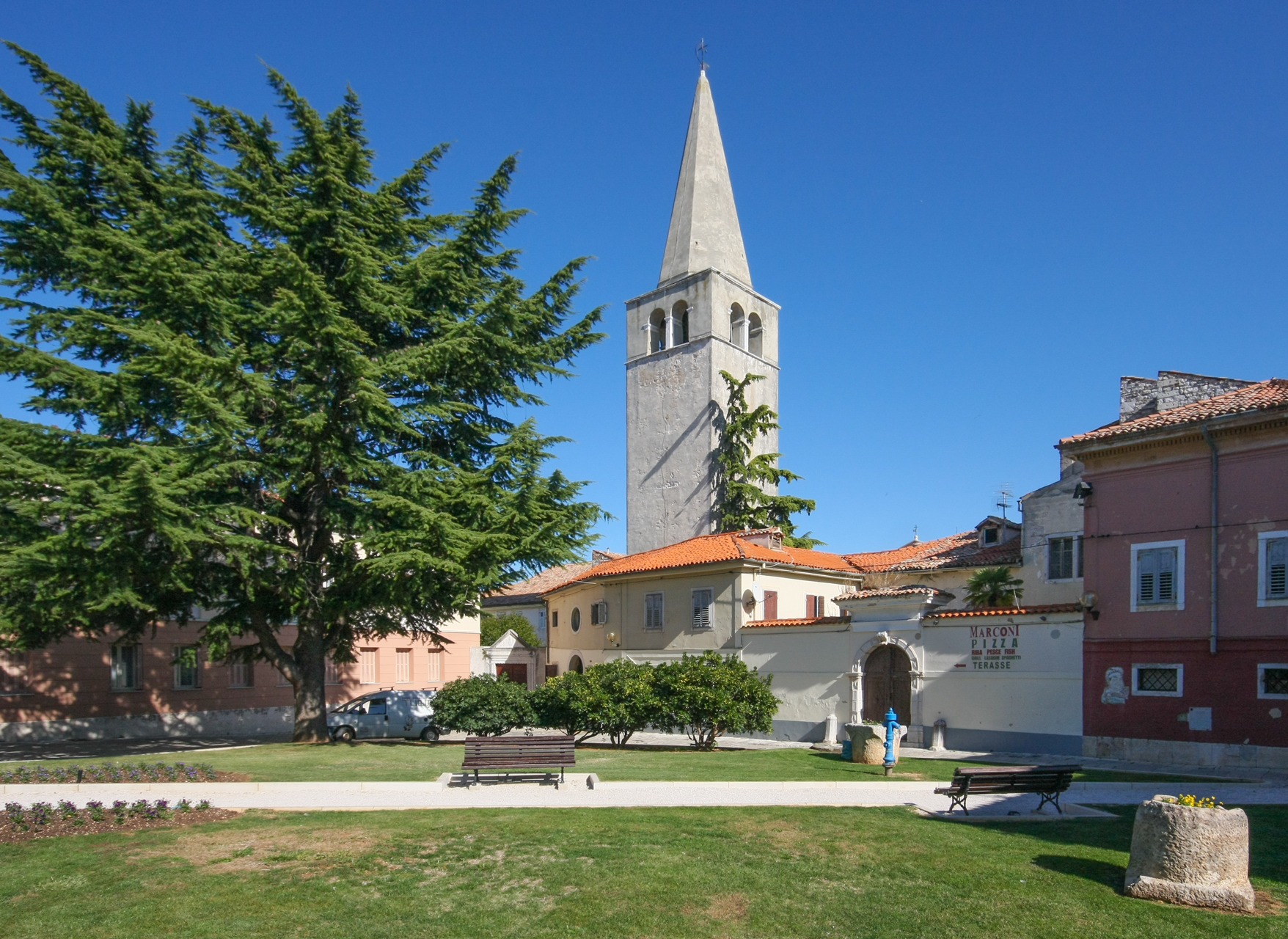
Tower bell of Euphrasian Basilica

=== Roman period ===
During the 2nd century BC, a Roman castrum was built on a tiny peninsula with approximate dimensions of 400 m × 200 m (1,312.34 ft × 656.17 ft) where the town centre is now. During the reign of Emperor Augustus in the 1st century BC, it officially became a city and was part of the Roman colony of Colonia Iulia Parentium.

In the 3rd century the settlement had an organised Christian community with an early Christian complex of sacral buildings. The earliest basilica contained the remains of and was dedicated to Saint Maurus of Parentium and dates back to the second half of the 4th century. The floor mosaic from its oratory, originally part of a large Roman house, is still preserved in the garden of the Euphrasian Basilica.

=== Middle Ages ===
With the fall of the Western Roman Empire in 476, different rulers and powers governed. First, it was held by the Ostrogoths and after 539 was part of the Byzantine Empire. From 788 it was ruled by the Franks. A short independence period followed in the 12th century and later it was ruled by the Patriarchate of Aquileia. In 1267 Parenzo became the first Istrian city that chose to become part of the Republic of Venice, whose rule lasted for more than five centuries. During this period several palaces, squares and religious buildings in Venetian style were built.

On 16 August 1354, during the War of the Straits, the city was destroyed by the Genoese under Paganino Doria, who carried off the relics of saints Eleutherius and Maurus to Genoa, where they were deposited at the church of San Matteo. In 1363 the town was given a city statute.

=== Modern period ===
The population was decimated by plague at the end of the 16th and the beginning of the 17th century. After the fall of the Venetian Republic, Parenzo came under the sovereignty of the Habsburg monarchy.

Between 1805 and 1814, Parenzo was part of the Napoleonic Kingdom of Italy and then of the Illyrian Provinces, nominally part of the First French Empire. After this period it was again annexed by the Habsburgs, with the Monarchy reorganized into the Austrian Empire. In 1844 a steamship connection was established between Parenzo and Trieste.

In 1861, under Austrian Littoral Parenzo became the seat of the regional Parliament, with schools, administrative and judiciary offices, and other services. During this time, it slowly became a shipbuilding center. It also became a popular tourist resort for the Austro-Hungarian aristocracy. Between 1902 and 1935 the Parenzana (from the name Parenzaner Bahn), a narrow-gauge railway line connected the town to Trieste.

After 1918, it became part of the Kingdom of Italy. In 1944, the city was bombed by the Allies 34 times, damaging 75% of the city.

==== Yugoslav period (1945/47–1991) ====
In 1947, two years after World War II, the city became part of Yugoslavia and the city name was changed into Poreč. The Italian population left the city and was replaced by Slavic people from different regions of Yugoslavia.

From 1945 to 1991, Poreč was a city of Croatia, then part of the Socialist Federal Republic of Yugoslavia.

==== Independent Croatia (since 1991) ====
In 1991 Croatia became an independent state. Today, the city's Italian name (Parenzo) is also used in an official capacity.

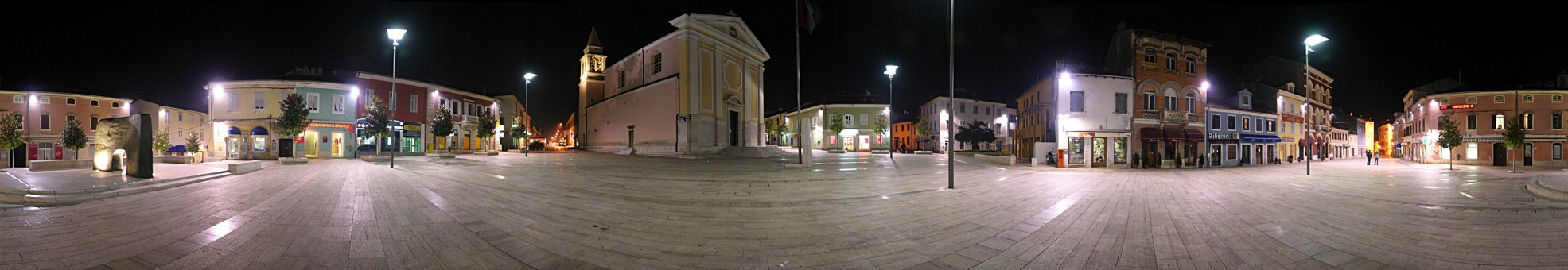
Center of Poreč by night

== Climate ==
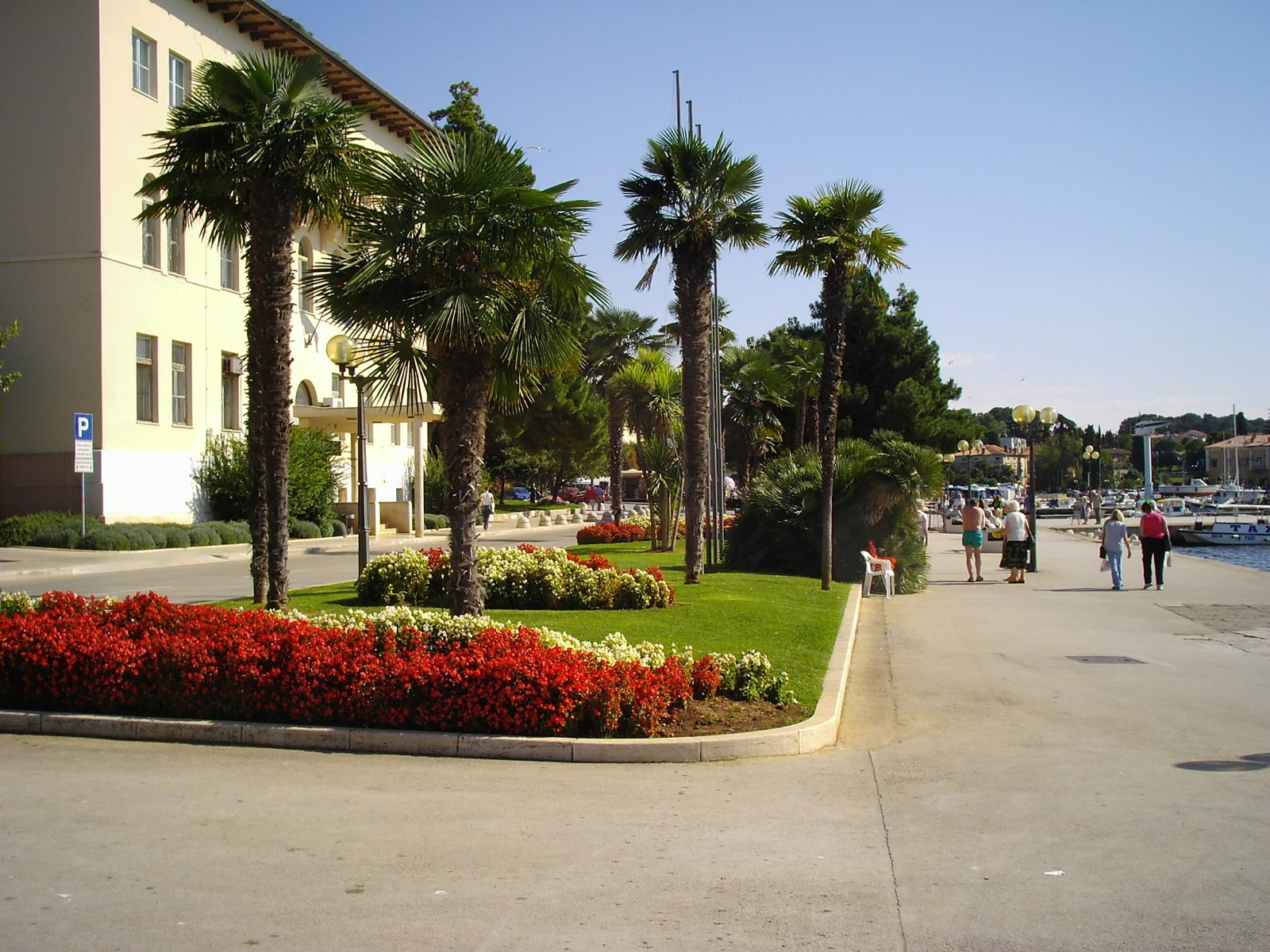
Poreč seaside

Situated on the western coast of Istria and cooled by sea breezes, the local climate is relatively mild and free of oppressive summer heat. The month of July is the hottest, with a maximum air temperature of 30°C in conditions of low humidity, while January is the coldest with an average of 6 °C (43 °F). There are more than 2,400 hours of sun a year, an average of more than 10 hours of sunshine during the summer days. Sea temperatures can reach 28 °C (82 °F), higher than one might expect compared to the coast of southern Croatia where the air temperatures are higher. The average annual rainfall of 920 mm (36.2 in) is more or less equally distributed throughout the year, although July and August are very dry. Winds here are the Bora, bringing the cold, clear weather from the north in the winter, and the Jugo, a warm southern wind bringing rain. The summer breeze that blows from the sea to the land is called the Maestral.

Since records began in 1981, the highest temperature recorded at the local weather station was 37.0 °C (98.6 °F), on 2 August 1998. The coldest temperature was −13.0 °C (8.6 °F), on 10 January 1981.

== Nearby sightseeing sites ==
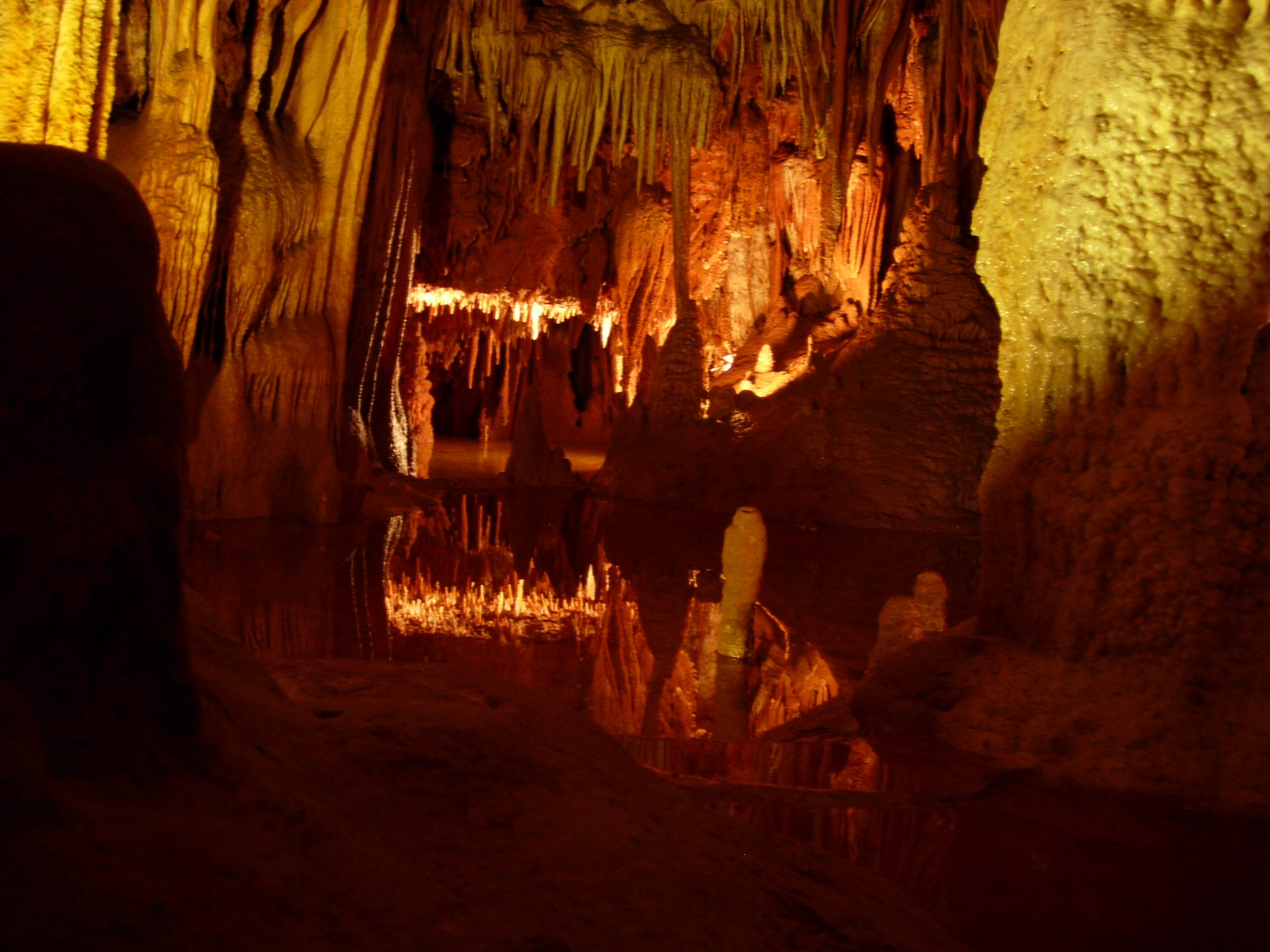
Baredine Cave

The Baredine Cave, the only open geological monument in Istria, is in the vicinity. Stalagmites in the cave are known for their curious shapes. One is said to resemble the Virgin Mary, another the Leaning Tower of Pisa.

Lim Bay is a 12-km long estuary with the aspect of a narrow canal, created by the river Pazinčica by eroding the ground on its way to the Adriatic Sea. Quartz boulders are occasionally found here, exposed by the sea.

== Vegetation and agriculture ==
The landscape is rich in Mediterranean vegetation, with pine woods and green bushes, mostly of the holm oak and strawberry tree. For generations, the fertile blood-red land (crljenica) has been used for agriculture, with cereals, orchards, olive groves and vegetables the main crops. Today the production of organic food is significant, including olives, grapes, and popular wines such as Malvazija, Borgonja, Merlot, Pinot, Cabernet Sauvignon and Teran.

== Transportation ==
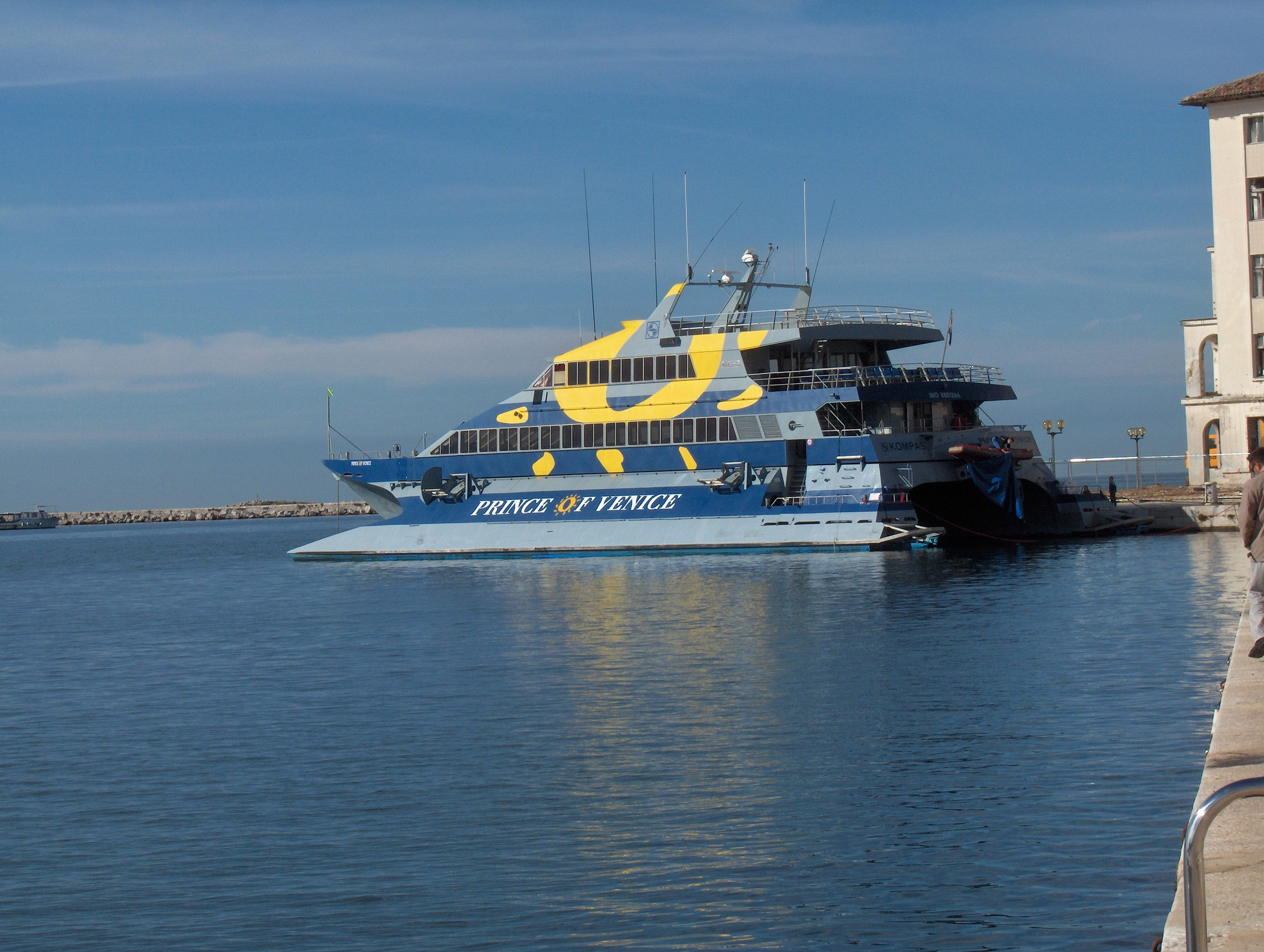
High-speed catamaran connecting the city to Venice

Road traffic is the primary form of transportation. Poreč is well-connected with the rest of Istria and with larger cities such as Trieste, Rijeka (Fiume), Ljubljana and Zagreb. The nearest commercial airport is in Pula (Pola). Sea traffic is less important today than it was in previous centuries; these days it is primarily used for tourist excursions. The closest railway station is in Pazin (Pisino), which is the seat of the Istria County local authority. Between 1902 and 1937 the Parenzana, a narrow-gauge railway line connected the town to Trieste.

== Economy ==
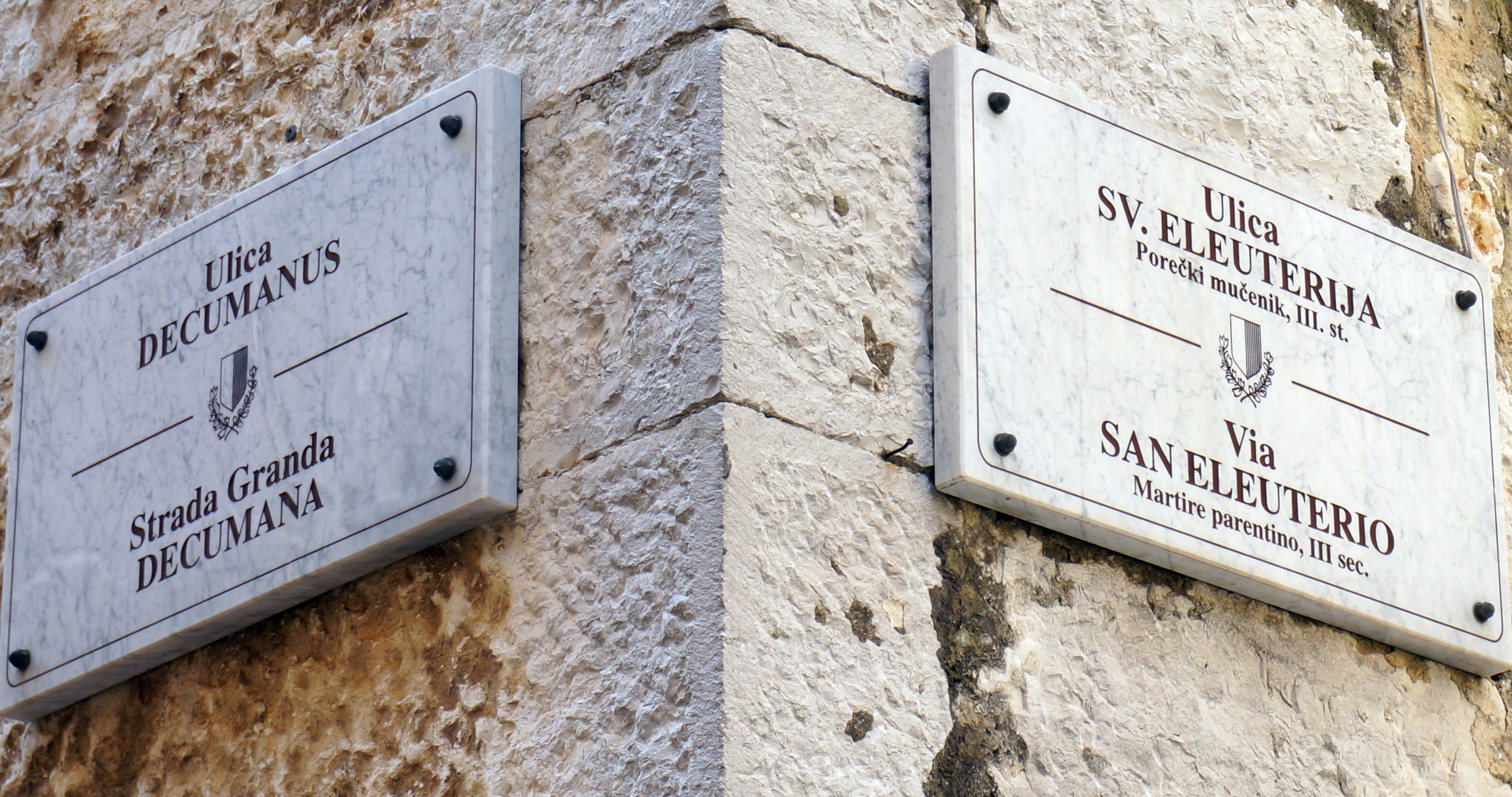
Intersection of Decumanus and Saint Eleutherius, martyr streets in central Poreč

Traditionally, economic activities have always been connected with the land and sea. The only significant industry in the area is food processing, but Croatia's ongoing integration into the broader European economy has led to Poreč seeing growth in its trade, finance and communication sectors. However, the primary source of income is tourism.

Real estate prices are very high due to the city's prime location.

== Demographics ==
Historical populations of Poreč
Year	Pop.	±%
1880	7,355	—
1890	8,478	+15.3%
1900	10,168	+19.9%
1910	12,439	+22.3%
1921	12,252	−1.5%
1931	12,607	+2.9%
1948	9,862	−21.8%
1953	8,604	−12.8%
1961	8,216	−4.5%
1971	8,820	+7.4%
1981	11,739	+33.1%
1991	14,633	+24.7%
2001	17,460	+19.3%
2011	16,696	−4.4%
Source: Naselja i stanovništvo Republike Hrvatske 1857–2001, DZS, Zagreb, 2005

According to the 2011 census, the main ethnic groups in Poreč are Croats (74.8%), Istrian Italians (3.2%), Serbs (3.4%), Albanians (2.7%) and Bosniaks (1.95%). Also part of the people of Poreč submitted the choice "regional" (as Istrian), regardless of their Italian or Croatian origin. In the common use Italian is spoken by 15% of the local population.

According to the 2011 census, there are 9,790 residents of the town of Poreč, and with all settlements included, municipality of Poreč has a total of 16,696 residents:

- Antonci-Antonzi, population 164
- Baderna-Mompaderno, population 240
- Banki-Banchi, population 17
- Bašarinka-Balsarina, population 90
- Blagdanići-Blagdanici, population 15
- Bonaci-Bonazzi, population 104
- Bratovići-Bratovici, population 19
- Brčići-Barcici, population 163
- Buići-Buici, population 131
- Cancini-Zanzini, population 158
- Červar-Porat-Porto Cervara, population 527
- Črvar-Cervara, population 99
- Čuši-Ciussi, population 20
- Dekovići-Decovici, population 45
- Dračevac-Dracevazzo, population 166
- Filipini, population 43
- Fuškulin-Foscolino, population 181
- Garbina, population 68
- Jakići Gorinji-Jacchi, population 18
- Jasenovica-Giasenovizza, population 50
- Jehnići-Gecni, population 39
- Jurići-Iurici, population 3
- Kadumi-Cadumi, population 216
- Katun-Cattuno, population 64
- Kirmenjak-Chirmegnacco, population 48
- Kosinožići-Cosini, population 99
- Kukci-Cucazzi, population 500
- Ladrovići-Ladri, population 86
- Matulini-Mottolini, population 16
- Mičetići-Micetti, population 37
- Mihatovići-Micatti, population 122
- Mihelići-Micheli, population 43
- Montižana-Montisano, population 57
- Mugeba-Monghebbo, population 180
- Mušalež-Monsalice, population 366
- Nova Vas-Villanova del Quieto, population 480
- Poreč, population 9,790
- Radmani, population 241
- Radoši kod Žbandaja-Radossi di Sbandati, population 115
- Rakovci-Racovazzi, population 26
- Rupeni, population 2
- Ružići-Rusi, population 19
- Stancija Vodopija-Stanzia Bevilacqua, population 116
- Starići-Stari, population 8
- Stranići kod Nove Vasi-Stancio, population 177
- Šeraje-Serraio, population 2
- Štifanići-Stefani, population 61
- Šušnjići-Susgnano, population 29
- Valkarin-Valcarina, population 44
- Veleniki-Velenicco, population 107
- Vrvari-Varvaro, population 792
- Vržnaveri-Vesnaveri, population 76
- Žbandaj-Sbandati, population 417
City of Poreč: Population trends 1857–2021
v

population	5748	6333	7355	8478	10168	12439	12252	12607	9862	8604	8216	8820	11739	14633	17460	16696	16607
	1857	1869	1880	1890	1900	1910	1921	1931	1948	1953	1961	1971	1981	1991	2001	2011	2021

Sources: Croatian Bureau of Statistics publications

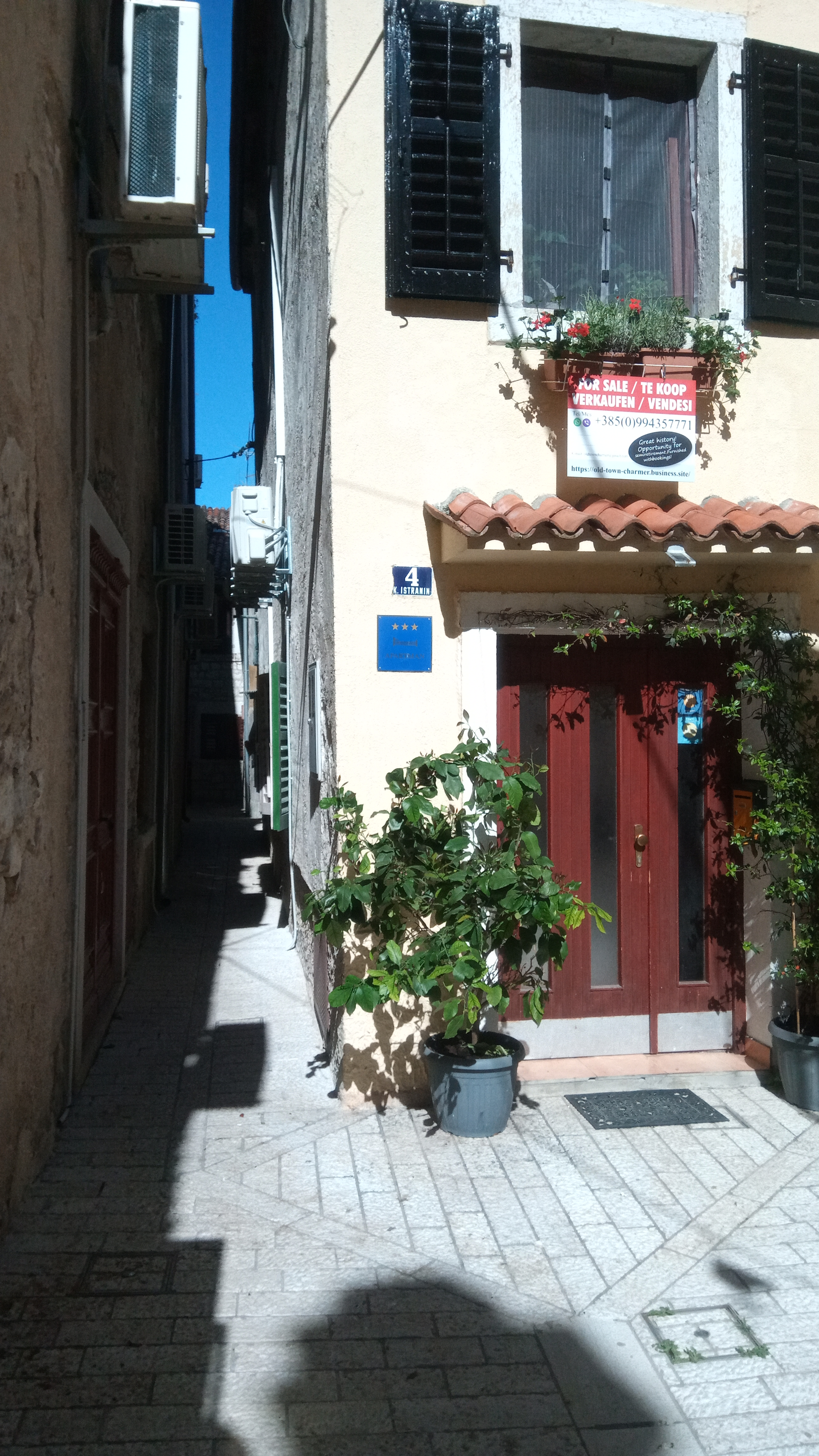
Ulica Stjepana Konzula Istranina

=== Languages ===
Although the Government of the Republic of Croatia does not guarantee official Croatian-Italian bilinguialism, the statute of Poreč itself guarantees it. Consequently, Italian is an official language in the town, along with Croatian.

== Main sights ==
The town plan still shows the ancient Roman Castrum structure. The main streets are Decumanus and Cardo Maximus, still preserved in their original forms. Marafor is a Roman square with two temples attached. One of them, erected in the first century AD, is dedicated to the Roman god Neptune; its dimensions are 30 by 11 m (98.43 by 36.09 ft). A few houses from the Romanesque period have been preserved and beautiful Venetian Gothic palaces can be seen here. Originally a Gothic Franciscan church built in the 13th century, the 'Dieta Istriana' hall was remodeled in the Baroque style in the 18th century.

The Euphrasian Basilica, rebuilt in the 6th century under the Byzantine Empire and bishop Euphrasius, is the most important historical site in Poreč. It is a protected World Heritage Site, so designated by UNESCO in 1997. Between the 12th and 19th centuries, the city had defensive walls, as the better-known Dubrovnik still does today.

Porec also has one of the smallest streets in Europe the Ulica Stjepana Konzula Istranina.

== Tourism ==
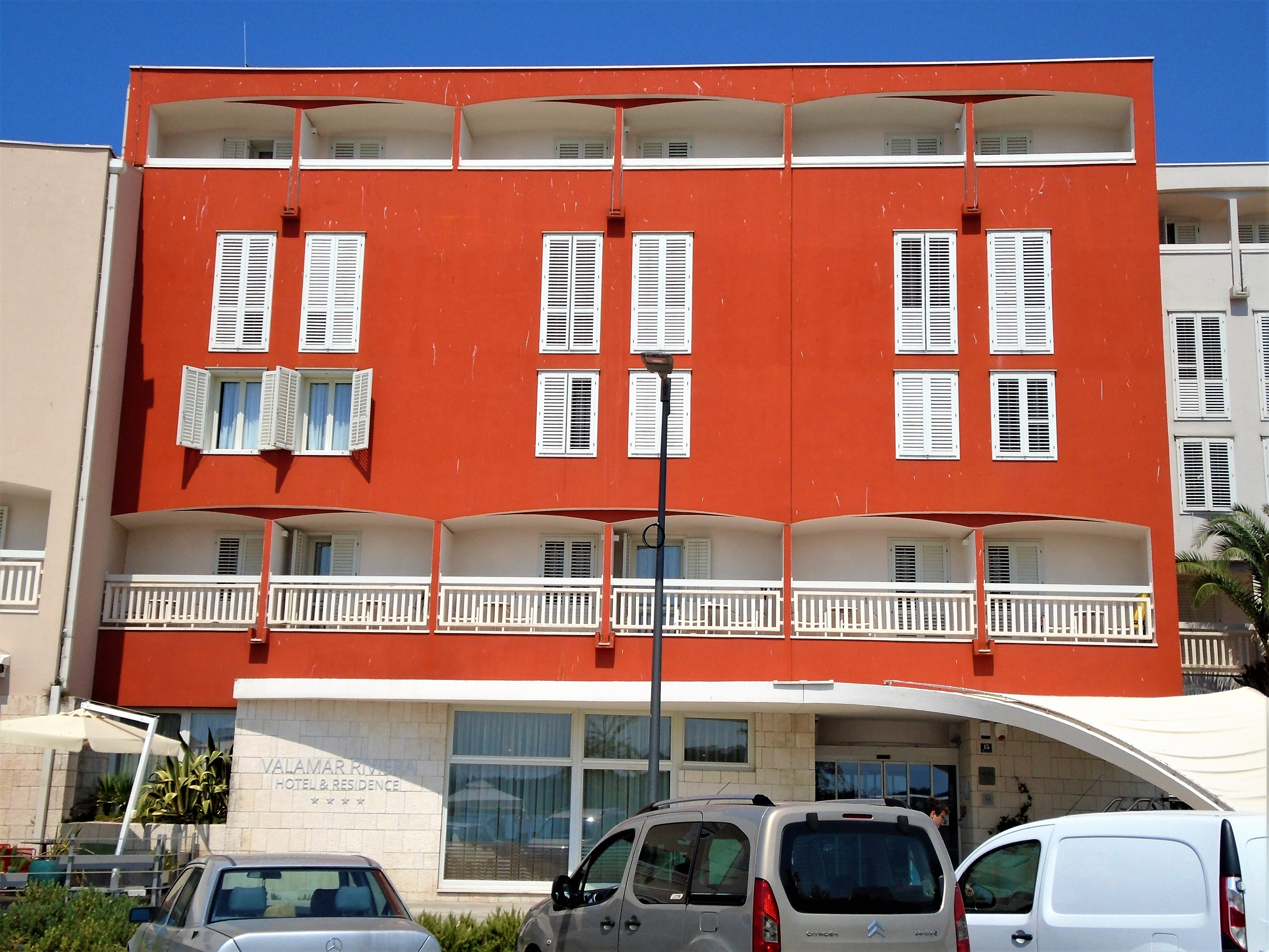
Renovated Riviera Hotel today

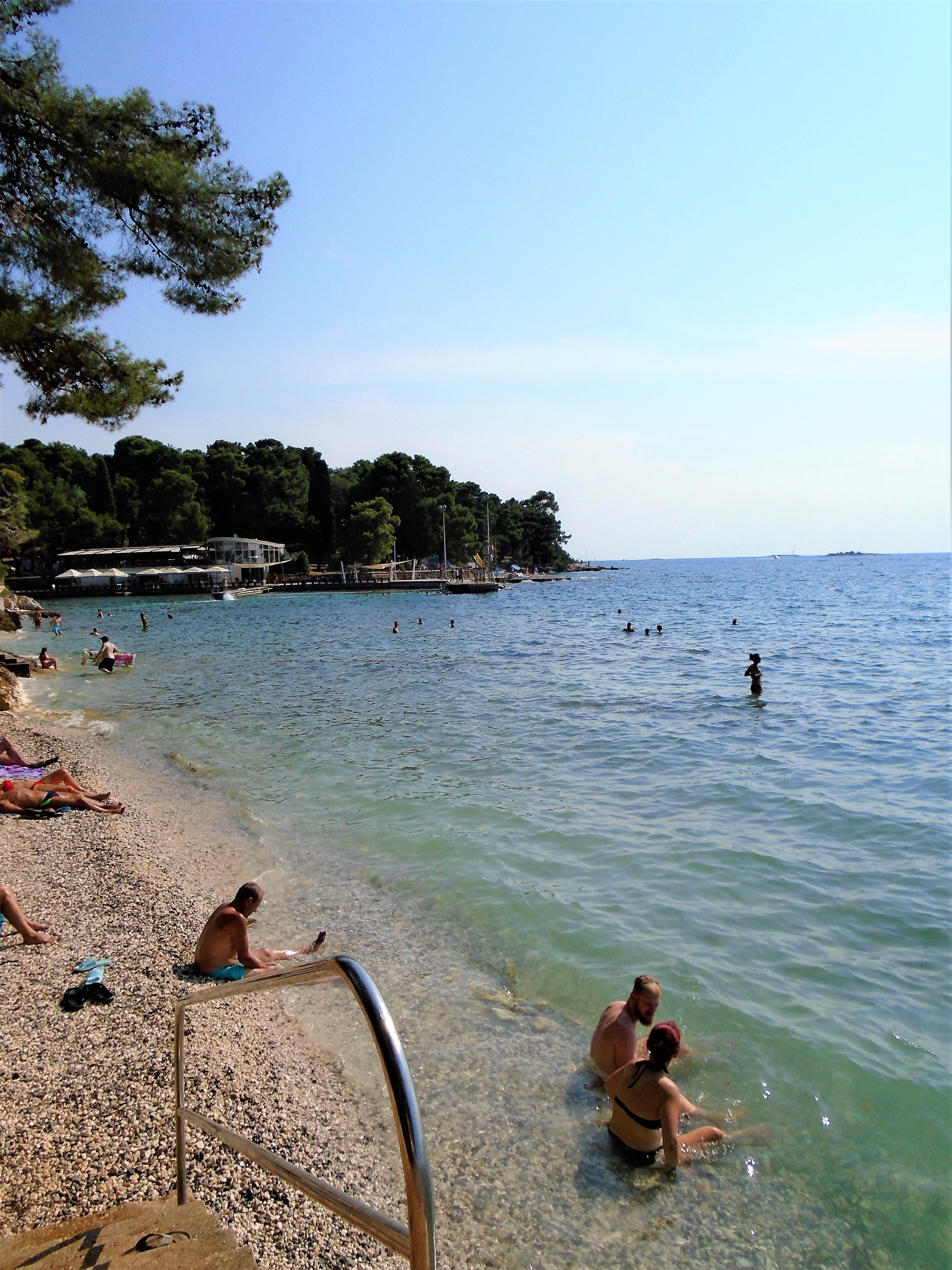
Beach in Poreč

In 1844, the Austrian Lloyd steamship company opened a tourist line which called at Parenzo. The first tourist guide describing and depicting the town was printed as early as 1845. The oldest hotel is the Riviera, constructed in 1910. Later came the Parentino and others.

Today, tourist infrastructure is intentionally dispersed along the 37 km (23 mi) long coastline, between the Mirna River and the deep Lim valley. The south hosts self-contained centres like Plava Laguna ("Blue Lagoon"), Zelena Laguna ("Green Lagoon"), Bijela Uvala ("White Cove") and Brulo. To the north, mirroring centres are Materada, Červar Porat, Ulika and Lanterna. In the high season, the area's temporary population can exceed 120,000.

Poreč's heritage can be seen in the historic town centre, in museums and galleries hosted in houses and palaces, many of them still private homes as they have been for centuries. In the off season, weekend visitors from Croatia, Slovenia, Austria and Italy visit the area. Sports complexes are developed and used year-round.

== Notable natives ==
Chronologically:

- Giuseppe Picciola, Italian poet (1859–1907)
- Giuseppe Pagano, Italian architect (1896–1945)
- Mario Visintini (1913–1941), Italian flying ace of the Spanish Civil War and World War II
- Licio Visintini (1915–1942), brother of Mario, Italian naval officer during World War II, member of an elite commando frogman unit
- Rita Rusić (1960), Italian actress, singer and producer
- Simon Sluga (1993), Croatian footballer

== Twin town and sister cities ==
- Massa Lombarda, Italy
- Siófok, Hungary
- Poing, Germany

== See also ==
- Roman Catholic Diocese of Poreč-Pula
