= Ružići, Poreč =

Ružići
- Village
- Location within Croatia
- Coordinates: 45.202688°N 13.6932947°E
- Country: Croatia
- County: Istria County
- Municipality: Poreč

Area
  - Total: 0.31 sq mi (0.8 km^{2})

Population (2021)
  - Total: 35
  - Density: 110/sq mi (44/km^{2})
- Time zone: UTC+1 (CET)
  - Summer (DST): UTC+2 (CEST)
- Postal code: 52440 Poreč
- Area code: 052

Ružići is a village in the municipality of Poreč, Istria in Croatia.

== Demographics ==
According to the 2021 census, its population was 35.
