= Kosinožići =

- Village
- Location within Croatia
- Coordinates: 45.244718°N 13.6231128°E
- Country: Croatia
- County: Istria County
- Municipality: Poreč

Area
  - Total: 1.3 sq mi (3.4 km^{2})

Population (2021)
  - Total: 132
  - Density: 100/sq mi (39/km^{2})
- Time zone: UTC+1 (CET)
  - Summer (DST): UTC+2 (CEST)
- Postal code: 52440 Poreč
- Area code: 052

Kosinožići is a village in the municipality of Poreč, Istria in Croatia.

== Demographics ==
According to the 2021 census, its population was 132.
