= Štifanići =

Štifanići Stefani
- Village
- Location within Croatia
- Coordinates: 45.1980367°N 13.7427074°E
- Country: Croatia
- County: Istria County
- Municipality: Poreč

Area
  - Total: 0.73 sq mi (1.9 km^{2})

Population (2021)
  - Total: 60
  - Density: 82/sq mi (32/km^{2})
- Time zone: UTC+1 (CET)
  - Summer (DST): UTC+2 (CEST)
- Postal code: 52445 Baderna
- Area code: 052

Štifanići (Italian: Stefani) is a village in the municipality of Poreč-Parenzo, Istria in Croatia.

== Demographics ==
According to the 2021 census, its population was 60.
