= Brčići =

Brčići Barcici
- Village
- Location within Croatia
- Coordinates: 45.2627582°N 13.6559607°E
- Country: Croatia
- County: Istria County
- Municipality: Poreč

Area
  - Total: 0.19 sq mi (0.5 km^{2})

Population (2021)
  - Total: 173
  - Density: 900/sq mi (350/km^{2})
- Time zone: UTC+1 (CET)
  - Summer (DST): UTC+2 (CEST)
- Postal code: 52446 Nova Vas
- Area code: 052

Brčići (Italian: Barcici) is a village in the municipality of Poreč-Parenzo, Istria in Croatia.

== Demographics ==
According to the 2021 census, its population was 173.
