= Črvar =

Črvar Cervera
- Village
- Location within Croatia
- Coordinates: 45.2656754°N 13.5739505°E
- Country: Croatia
- County: Istria County
- Municipality: Poreč

Area
  - Total: 1.8 sq mi (4.7 km^{2})

Population (2021)
  - Total: 97
  - Density: 53/sq mi (21/km^{2})
- Time zone: UTC+1 (CET)
  - Summer (DST): UTC+2 (CEST)
- Postal code: 52449 Červar Porat
- Area code: 052

Črvar or Červar (Italian: Cervera) is a village in the municipality of Poreč-Parenzo, Istria in Croatia.

== Demographics ==
According to the 2021 census, its population was 97.
