= Kadumi =

Kadumi Cadumi
- Village
- Location within Croatia
- Coordinates: 45.2156217°N 13.6467538°E
- Country: Croatia
- County: Istria County
- Municipality: Poreč

Area
  - Total: 0.42 sq mi (1.1 km^{2})

Population (2021)
  - Total: 237
  - Density: 560/sq mi (220/km^{2})
- Time zone: UTC+1 (CET)
  - Summer (DST): UTC+2 (CEST)
- Postal code: 52440 Poreč
- Area code: 052

Kadumi (Italian: Cadumi) is a village in the municipality of Poreč-Parenzo, Istria in Croatia.

== Demographics ==
According to the 2021 census, its population was 237.
