= Radmani =

Radmani Radamanni
- Village
- Location within Croatia
- Coordinates: 45.2024995°N 13.6532493°E
- Country: Croatia
- County: Istria County
- Municipality: Poreč

Area
  - Total: 1.6 sq mi (4.1 km^{2})

Population (2021)
  - Total: 256
  - Density: 160/sq mi (62/km^{2})
- Time zone: UTC+1 (CET)
  - Summer (DST): UTC+2 (CEST)
- Postal code: 52440 Poreč
- Area code: 052

Radmani (Italian: Radamanni) is a village in the municipality of Poreč-Parenzo, Istria in Croatia.

== Demographics ==
According to the 2021 census, its population was 256.
