= Fuškulin =

Fuškulin Foscolino
- Village
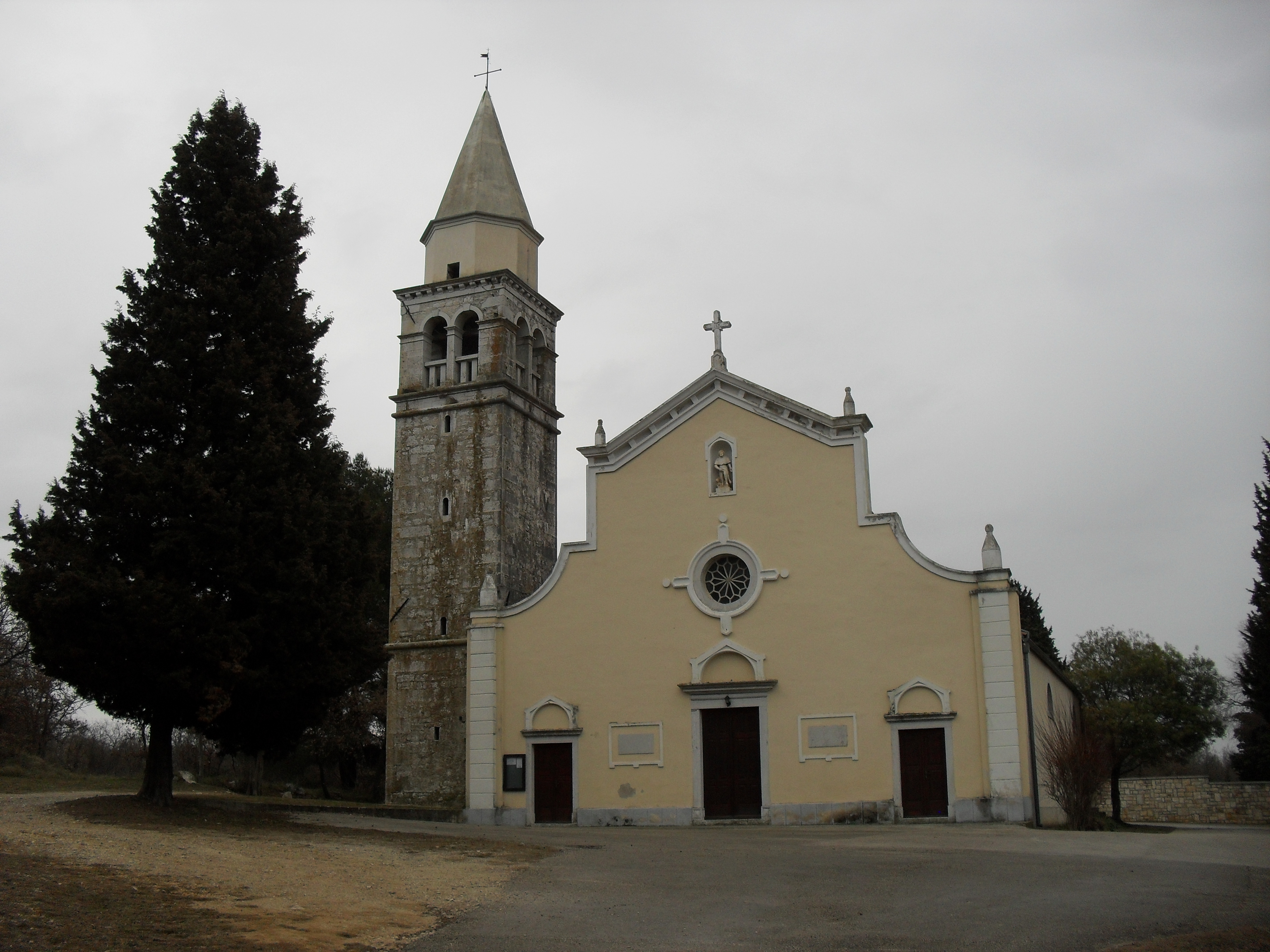

- Location within Croatia
- Coordinates: 45.1774177°N 13.6227704°E
- Country: Croatia
- County: Istria County
- Municipality: Poreč

Area
  - Total: 1.5 sq mi (3.8 km^{2})

Population (2021)
  - Total: 221
  - Density: 150/sq mi (58/km^{2})
- Time zone: UTC+1 (CET)
  - Summer (DST): UTC+2 (CEST)
- Postal code: 52440 Poreč
- Area code: 052

Fuškulin is a village in the municipality of Poreč, Istria in Croatia.

== Demographics ==
According to the 2021 census, its population was 221.
