= Buići =

Buići can refer to one of the following:

Croatia

- Buići, Dubrovnik-Neretva County
- Buići, Istria County
