= Stancija Vodopija =

Stancija Vodopija Stanzia Bevilacqua
- Village
- Location within Croatia
- Coordinates: 45.2626315°N 13.611693°E
- Country: Croatia
- County: Istria County
- Municipality: Poreč

Area
  - Total: 0.12 sq mi (0.3 km^{2})

Population (2021)
  - Total: 145
  - Density: 1,300/sq mi (480/km^{2})
- Time zone: UTC+1 (CET)
  - Summer (DST): UTC+2 (CEST)
- Postal code: 52440 Poreč
- Area code: 052

Stancija Vodopija (Italian: Stanzia Bevilacqua) is a village in the municipality of Poreč-Parenzo, Istria in Croatia.

== Demographics ==
According to the 2021 census, its population was 145.
