= Valkarin =

- Village
- Location within Croatia
- Coordinates: 45.2018935°N 13.6369516°E
- Country: Croatia
- County: Istria County
- Municipality: Poreč

Area
  - Total: 0.50 sq mi (1.3 km^{2})

Population (2021)
  - Total: 52
  - Density: 100/sq mi (40/km^{2})
- Time zone: UTC+1 (CET)
  - Summer (DST): UTC+2 (CEST)
- Postal code: 52440 Poreč
- Area code: 052

Valkarin is a village in the municipality of Poreč, Istria in Croatia.

== Demographics ==
According to the 2021 census, its population was 52.
