= Kirmenjak =

Kirmenjak Chirmegnacco
- Village
- Location within Croatia
- Coordinates: 45.1919016°N 13.6838463°E
- Country: Croatia
- County: Istria County
- Municipality: Poreč

Area
  - Total: 0.50 sq mi (1.3 km^{2})

Population (2021)
  - Total: 49
  - Density: 98/sq mi (38/km^{2})
- Time zone: UTC+1 (CET)
  - Summer (DST): UTC+2 (CEST)
- Postal code: 52440 Poreč
- Area code: 052

Kirmenjak (Italian: Chirmegnacco)is a village in the municipality of Poreč-Parenzo, Istria in Croatia.

== Demographics ==
According to the 2021 census, its population was 49.
