= Bonaci =

Bonaci Bonazzi
- Village
- Location within Croatia
- Coordinates: 45.2076646°N 13.7111425°E
- Country: Croatia
- County: Istria County
- Municipality: Poreč

Area
  - Total: 0.97 sq mi (2.5 km^{2})

Population (2021)
  - Total: 130
  - Density: 130/sq mi (52/km^{2})
- Time zone: UTC+1 (CET)
  - Summer (DST): UTC+2 (CEST)
- Postal code: 52445 Baderna
- Area code: 052

Bonaci (Italian: Bonazzi) is a village in the municipality of Poreč-Parenzo, Istria in Croatia. The total area of Bonaci-Bonazzi is 2.5 km^{2}.

== Demographics ==
According to the 2021 census, the village's population was 130.
