= Bašarinka =

Bašarinka Balsarina
- Village
- Location within Croatia
- Coordinates: 45.2675188°N 13.6210693°E
- Country: Croatia
- County: Istria County
- Municipality: Poreč

Area
  - Total: 0.39 sq mi (1.0 km^{2})

Population (2021)
  - Total: 106
  - Density: 270/sq mi (110/km^{2})
- Time zone: UTC+1 (CET)
  - Summer (DST): UTC+2 (CEST)
- Postal code: 52449 Červar Porat
- Area code: 052

Bašarinka (Italian: Balsarina) is a village in the municipality of Poreč-Parenzo, Istria in Croatia.

== Demographics ==
According to the 2021 census, its population was 106.
