= Červar-Porat =

- Village
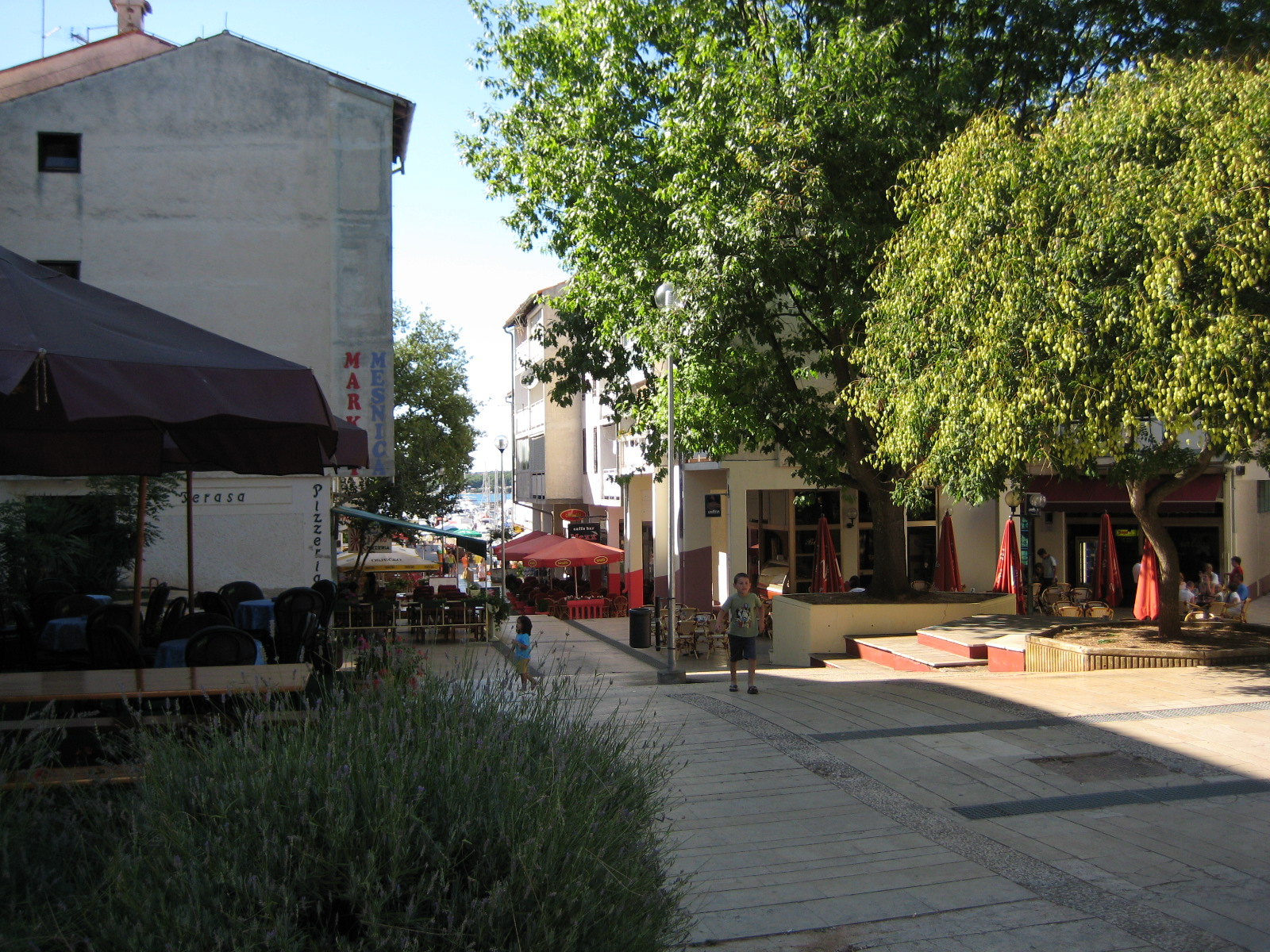

- Location within Croatia
- Coordinates: 45°16′19″N 13°36′00″E
- Country: Croatia
- County: Istria County
- Municipality: Poreč

Area
  - Total: 0.12 sq mi (0.3 km^{2})
- Elevation: 9.8 ft (3 m)

Population (2021)
  - Total: 381
  - Density: 3,300/sq mi (1,300/km^{2})
- Time zone: UTC+1 (CET)
  - Summer (DST): UTC+2 (CEST)
- Postal code: 52449 Červar-Porat
- Area code: 052

Červar-Porat is a village in Istria region of Croatia. The settlement is administered as a part of the City of Poreč and the Istria County.

== Demographics ==
According to the 2021 census, its population was 381. According to the 2011 census, the village had 527 inhabitants.
