= Stranići kod Nove Vasi =

Stranići kod Nove Vasi Stancio
- Village
- Location within Croatia
- Coordinates: 45.2657172°N 13.6353768°E
- Country: Croatia
- County: Istria County
- Municipality: Poreč

Area
  - Total: 0.23 sq mi (0.6 km^{2})

Population (2021)
  - Total: 199
  - Density: 860/sq mi (330/km^{2})
- Time zone: UTC+1 (CET)
  - Summer (DST): UTC+2 (CEST)
- Postal code: 52446 Nova Vas
- Area code: 052

Stranići kod Nove Vasi (Italian: Stancio) is a village in the municipality of Poreč-Parenzo, Istria in Croatia.

== Demographics ==
According to the 2021 census, its population was 199.
