= Matulini =

Matulini Mattulini
- Village
- Location within Croatia
- Coordinates: 45.2023749°N 13.7225051°E
- Country: Croatia
- County: Istria County
- Municipality: Poreč

Area
  - Total: 0.54 sq mi (1.4 km^{2})

Population (2021)
  - Total: 26
  - Density: 48/sq mi (19/km^{2})
- Time zone: UTC+1 (CET)
  - Summer (DST): UTC+2 (CEST)
- Postal code: 52445 Baderna
- Area code: 052

Matulini (Italian: Mattulini) is a village in the municipality of Poreč-Parenzo, Istria in Croatia.

== Demographics ==
According to the 2021 census, its population was 26.
