= Jehnići =

- Village
- Location within Croatia
- Coordinates: 45.2245821°N 13.6979113°E
- Country: Croatia
- County: Istria County
- Municipality: Poreč

Area
  - Total: 0.62 sq mi (1.6 km^{2})

Population (2021)
  - Total: 29
  - Density: 47/sq mi (18/km^{2})
- Time zone: UTC+1 (CET)
  - Summer (DST): UTC+2 (CEST)
- Postal code: 52440 Poreč
- Area code: 052

Jehnići is a village in the municipality of Poreč, Istria in Croatia, on the western coast of the Istrian Peninsula.

== Demographics ==
According to the 2021 census, its population was 29.

== Position ==
15/17 minutes away from the sea and Poreč-Parenzo, the largest city near the town.

== Vegetation and animals ==
This town is in the middle of nature, between expanses of fields and woods. You can find animals such as deer, foxes and wild boars.

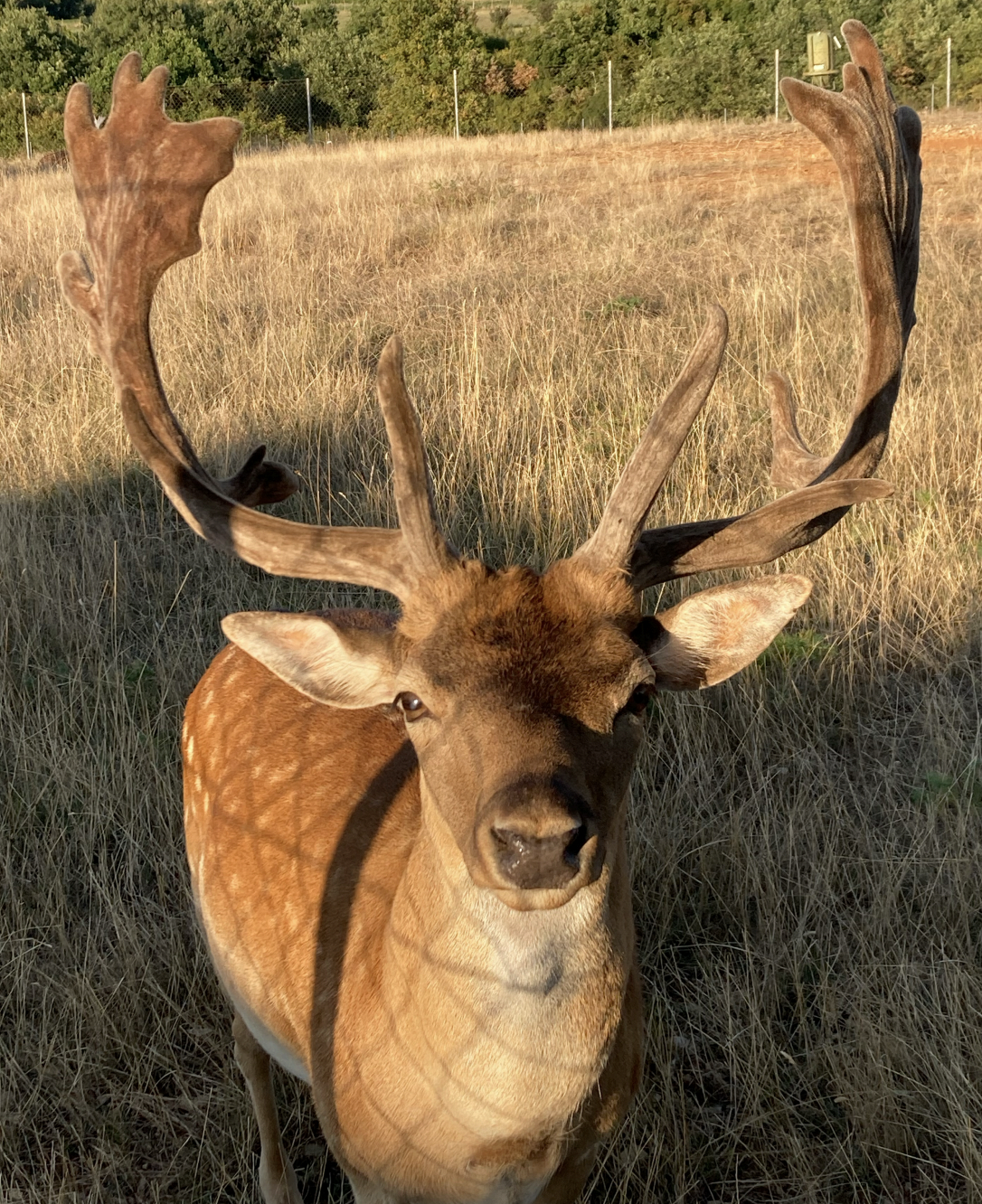
wild fauna in Jehnići

== Tourism ==
In this small town, there is one place to rent holiday homes and a farm which sells fresh food such as tomatoes, salad, Istrian Ham, brandy and wine.

== Climate ==
The local climate is mild, in summer you can find hot days that towards the evening require a sweatshirt, being in the countryside. July is the hottest month, with a maximum of 30°C.
