= Kukci =

Kukci Cucazzi
- Village
- Interactive map of Kukci
- Location within Croatia
- Coordinates: 45.2605581°N 13.620386°E
- Country: Croatia
- County: Istria County
- Municipality: Poreč

Area
  - Total: 0.69 sq mi (1.8 km^{2})

Population (2021)
  - Total: 526
  - Density: 760/sq mi (290/km^{2})
- Time zone: UTC+1 (CET)
  - Summer (DST): UTC+2 (CEST)
- Postal code: 52446 Nova Vas
- Area code: 052

Kukci (Italian: Cucazzi) is a village in the municipality of Poreč-Parenzo, Istria in Croatia.

== Demographics ==
According to the 2021 census, its population was 526.
