= Vržnaveri =

Vržnaveri Vesnaveri
- Village
- Location within Croatia
- Coordinates: 45.239856°N 13.6642961°E
- Country: Croatia
- County: Istria County
- Municipality: Poreč

Area
  - Total: 1.2 sq mi (3.2 km^{2})

Population (2021)
  - Total: 82
  - Density: 66/sq mi (26/km^{2})
- Time zone: UTC+1 (CET)
  - Summer (DST): UTC+2 (CEST)
- Postal code: 52446 Nova Vas
- Area code: 052

Vržnaveri (Italian: Vesnaveri) is a village in the municipality of Poreč-Parenzo, Istria in Croatia.

== Demographics ==
According to the 2021 census, its population was 82.
