= Dekovići =

Dekovići Decovici
- Village
- Location within Croatia
- Coordinates: 45.2537265°N 13.6646069°E
- Country: Croatia
- County: Istria County
- Municipality: Poreč

Area
  - Total: 0.66 sq mi (1.7 km^{2})

Population (2021)
  - Total: 44
  - Density: 67/sq mi (26/km^{2})
- Time zone: UTC+1 (CET)
  - Summer (DST): UTC+2 (CEST)
- Postal code: 52446 Nova Vas
- Area code: 052

Dekovići (Italian: Decovici) is a village in the municipality of Poreč-Parenzo, Istria in Croatia.

== Demographics ==
According to the 2021 census, its population was 44.
