= Blagdanići =

Blagdanići Blagdanaci
- Village
- Location within Croatia
- Coordinates: 45.2556695°N 13.6402971°E
- Country: Croatia
- County: Istria County
- Municipality: Poreč

Area
  - Total: 0.58 sq mi (1.5 km^{2})

Population (2021)
  - Total: 22
  - Density: 38/sq mi (15/km^{2})
- Time zone: UTC+1 (CET)
  - Summer (DST): UTC+2 (CEST)
- Postal code: 52446 Nova Vas
- Area code: 052

Blagdanići (Italian: Blagdanaci) is a village in the municipality of Poreč-Parenzo, Istria in Croatia.

== Demographics ==
According to the 2021 census, its population was 22.
