= Mihelići =

Mihelići Micheli
- Village
- Location within Croatia
- Coordinates: 45.2312714°N 13.6698623°E
- Country: Croatia
- County: Istria County
- Municipality: Poreč

Area
  - Total: 0.77 sq mi (2.0 km^{2})

Population (2021)
  - Total: 57
  - Density: 74/sq mi (28/km^{2})
- Time zone: UTC+1 (CET)
  - Summer (DST): UTC+2 (CEST)
- Postal code: 52440 Poreč
- Area code: 052

Mihelići (Italian: Micheli) is a village in the municipality of Poreč-Parenzo, Istria in Croatia.

== Demographics ==
According to the 2021 census, its population was 57.
