= Mičetići =

Mičetići Micetti
- Village
- Location within Croatia
- Coordinates: 45.2156571°N 13.6884026°E
- Country: Croatia
- County: Istria County
- Municipality: Poreč

Area
  - Total: 0.39 sq mi (1.0 km^{2})

Population (2021)
  - Total: 28
  - Density: 73/sq mi (28/km^{2})
- Time zone: UTC+1 (CET)
  - Summer (DST): UTC+2 (CEST)
- Postal code: 52440 Poreč
- Area code: 052

Mičetići (Italian: Micetti) is a village in the municipality of Poreč-Parenzo, Istria in Croatia.

== Demographics ==
According to the 2021 census, its population was 28.
