= Čuši =

Čuši Ciussi
- Village
- Location within Croatia
- Coordinates: 45.1767166°N 13.6608003°E
- Country: Croatia
- County: Istria County
- Municipality: Poreč

Area
  - Total: 0.39 sq mi (1.0 km^{2})

Population (2021)
  - Total: 27
  - Density: 70/sq mi (27/km^{2})
- Time zone: UTC+1 (CET)
  - Summer (DST): UTC+2 (CEST)
- Postal code: 52440 Poreč
- Area code: 052

Čuši (Italian: Ciussi) is a village in the municipality of Poreč-Parenzo, Istria in Croatia.

== Demographics ==
According to the 2021 census, its population was 27.
