= Nova Vas, Poreč =

Nova Vas
- Village
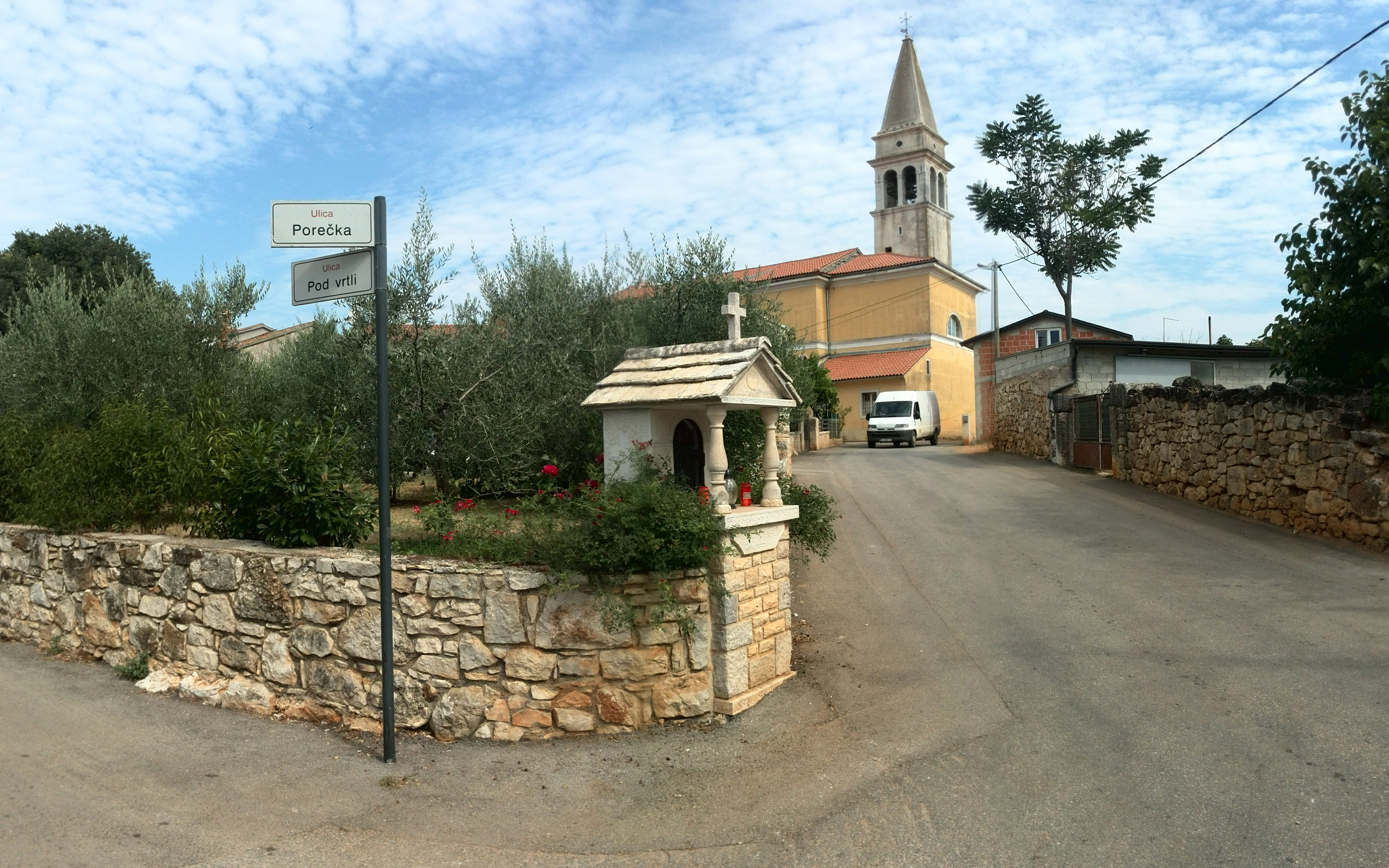

- Location within Croatia
- Coordinates: 45.2597671°N 13.6499084°E
- Country: Croatia
- County: Istria County
- Municipality: Poreč

Area
  - Total: 0.66 sq mi (1.7 km^{2})

Population (2021)
  - Total: 589
  - Density: 900/sq mi (350/km^{2})
- Time zone: UTC+1 (CET)
  - Summer (DST): UTC+2 (CEST)
- Postal code: 52446 Nova Vas
- Area code: 052

Nova Vas is a village in the municipality of Poreč, Istria in Croatia.

== Demographics ==
According to the 2021 census, its population was 589.

== History ==
The broader region around Nova Vas has been inhabited since prehistoric times and was later influenced by Roman civilization. The modern settlement developed during the Venetian period, particularly in the 16th century, when refugees fleeing Ottoman expansion were settled in the area. Over the centuries, the village shared the historical trajectory of Istria, passing through Venetian, Austro-Hungarian, Italian, and Yugoslav administration before becoming part of modern Croatia.

== Geography ==
Baredine Cave (Jama Baredine) is a karst cave near Nova Vas is a geomorphological natural monument with stalactites, stalagmites, underground lakes, and endemic amphibians such as the Croatian olm (proteus). It was opened to the public in 1995.
