= Jasenovica, Istria County =

Jasenovica Frassineto
- Village
- Location within Croatia
- Coordinates: 45.1718108°N 13.6453838°E
- Country: Croatia
- County: Istria County
- Municipality: Poreč

Area
  - Total: 1.0 sq mi (2.7 km^{2})

Population (2021)
  - Total: 56
  - Density: 54/sq mi (21/km^{2})
- Time zone: UTC+1 (CET)
  - Summer (DST): UTC+2 (CEST)
- Postal code: 52440 Poreč
- Area code: 052

Jasenovica (Italian: Giasenovizza; Frassineto) is a village in the municipality of Poreč-Parenzo, Istria in Croatia.

== Demographics ==
According to the 2021 census, its population was 56.
