= Baredine Cave =

Coordinates: 45.2703°N 13.6617°E

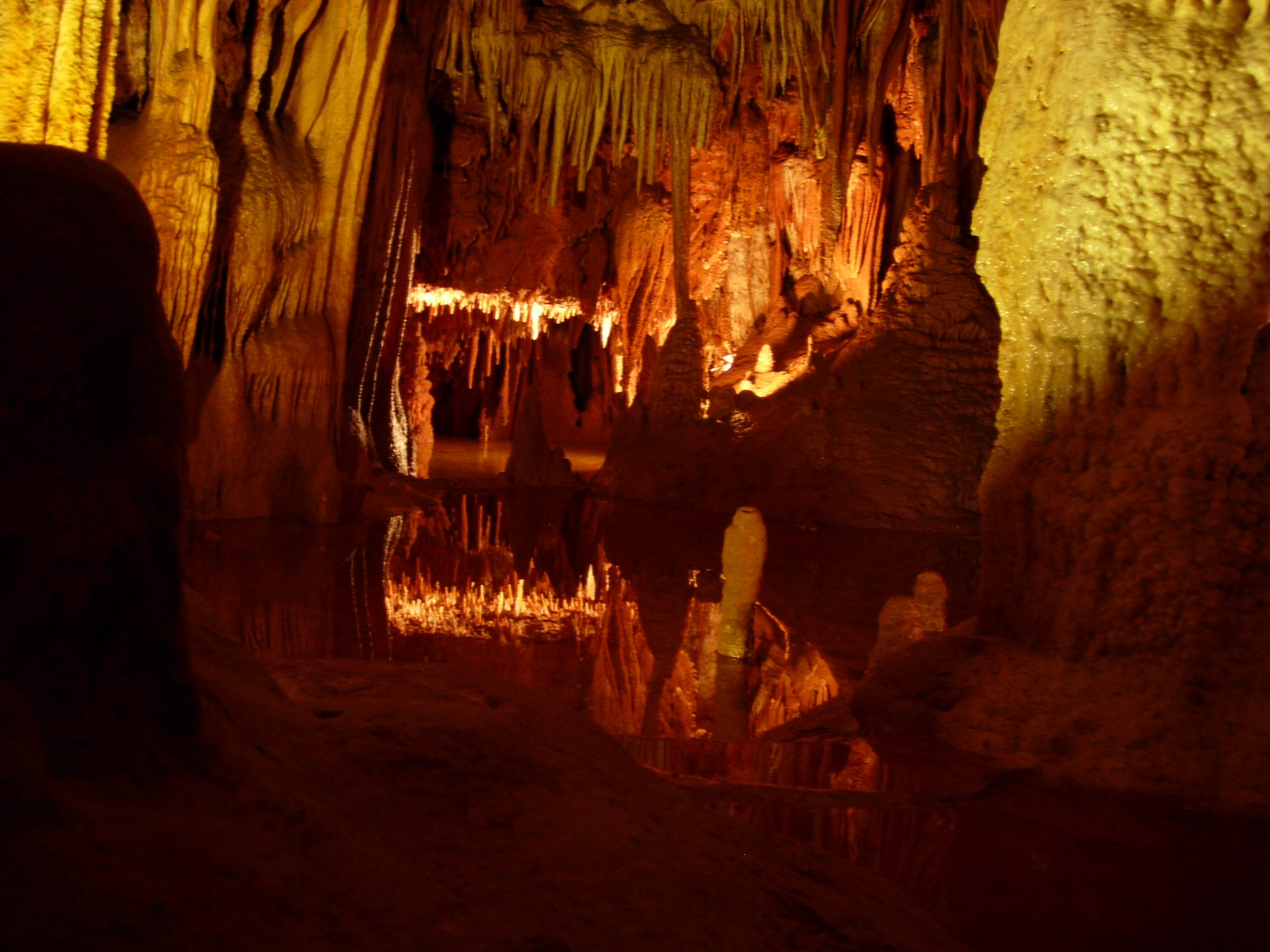
Baredine Cave

Baredine Cave is a cave in Istria in western Croatia, open to tourists since 1995.

== See also ==
- List of Dinaric caves

== Sources ==
- Baredine, jama kraj Poreča at istrapedia.hr (in Croatian)
