= Vrvari =

Vrvari Varvari
- Village
- Location within Croatia
- Country: Croatia
- County: Istria County
- Municipality: Poreč

Area
  - Total: 0.81 sq mi (2.1 km^{2})

Population (2021)
  - Total: 951
  - Density: 1,200/sq mi (450/km^{2})
- Time zone: UTC+1 (CET)
  - Summer (DST): UTC+2 (CEST)
- Postal code: 52440 Poreč
- Area code: 052

Vrvari is a village in the municipality of Poreč, Istria in Croatia.

== Demographics ==
According to the 2021 census, its population was 951. It was 792 in 2011.
