= Nova Vas District =

Coordinates: 46°32′39″N 15°36′52″E

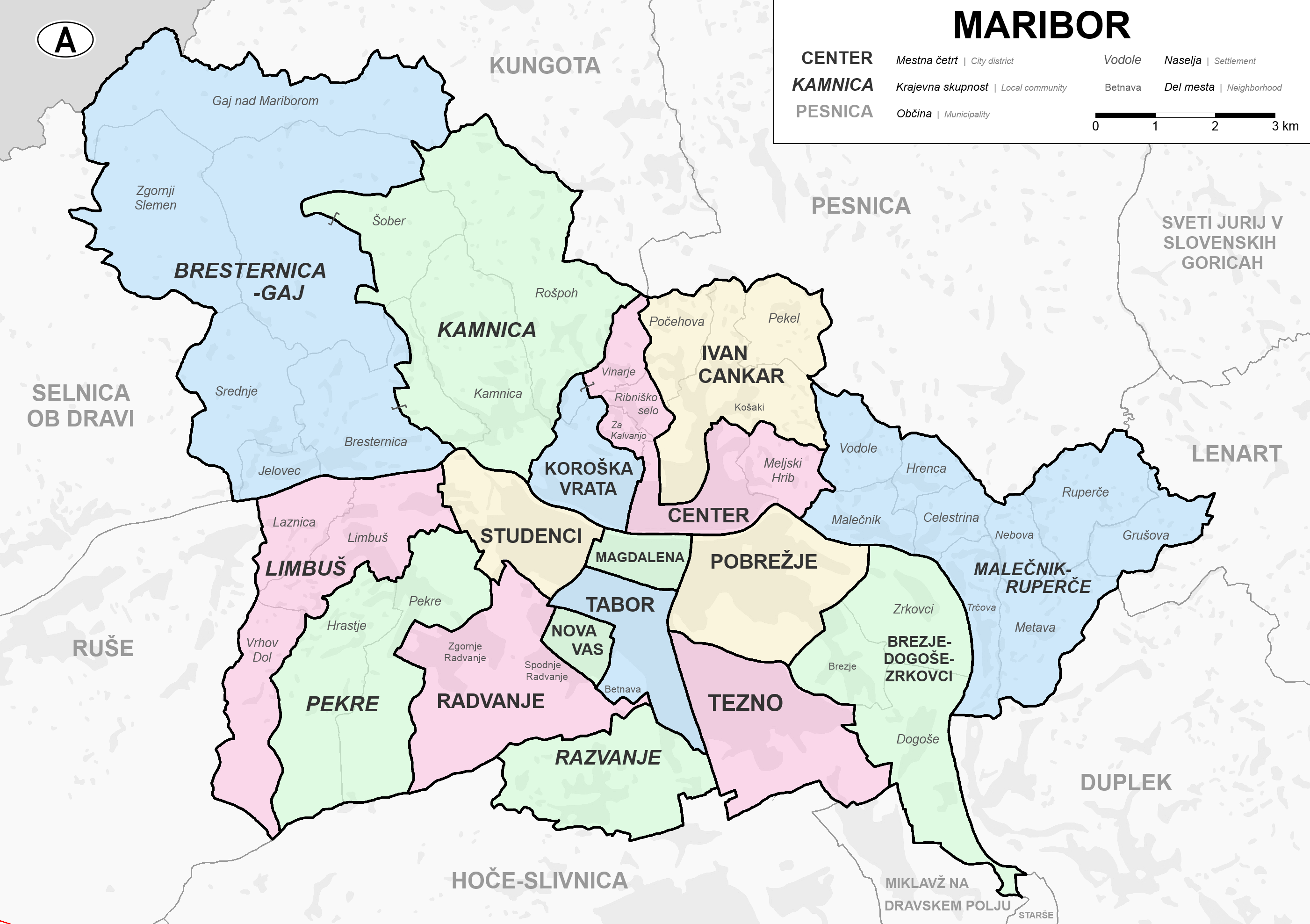
City districts and Local communities of Maribor, depicting the Nova Vas district

The Nova Vas District (pronounced [ˈnɔːʋa ˈʋaːs]; Slovene: Mestna četrt Nova vas, literally meaning New Village District) is a city district of the City Municipality of Maribor in northeastern Slovenia. In 2012, the district had a population of 10,391. It is the smallest district of the municipality, but one of the biggest by population. It is almost fully covered by apartment blocks, built in the 1980s. The highest building is 16 stories high. The district is split into several smaller districts and neighborhoods. The district includes the Adolf Drolc Clinic and the Maribor Police Station No. 2. Two schools are located in the Nova Vas District, one in Nova Vas 2 (Maribor Leon Štukelj Elementary School) and another in Nova Vas 1 (Tabor Elementary School No. 1).
