= Žbandaj =

Žbandaj Sbandati
- Village
- Location within Croatia
- Country: Croatia
- County: Istria County
- Municipality: Poreč

Area
  - Total: 0.93 sq mi (2.4 km^{2})

Population (2021)
  - Total: 538
  - Density: 580/sq mi (220/km^{2})
- Time zone: UTC+1 (CET)
  - Summer (DST): UTC+2 (CEST)
- Postal code: 52446 Nova Vas
- Area code: 052

Žbandaj (Italian: Sbandati) is a village in the municipality of Poreč-Parenzo, Istria in Croatia.

== Demographics ==
According to the 2021 census, its population was 538. It was 296 in 2001.
