= Dračevac, Istria County =

Dračevac Monspinoso
- Village
- Interactive map of Dračevac
- Location within Croatia
- Coordinates: 45.188363°N 13.6651449°E
- Country: Croatia
- County: Istria County
- Municipality: Poreč

Area
  - Total: 0.85 sq mi (2.2 km^{2})

Population (2021)
  - Total: 167
  - Density: 200/sq mi (76/km^{2})
- Time zone: UTC+1 (CET)
  - Summer (DST): UTC+2 (CEST)
- Postal code: 52440 Poreč
- Area code: 052

Dračevac (Italian: Monspinoso) is a village in the municipality of Poreč-Parenzo, Istria in Croatia.

== Demographics ==
According to the 2021 census, its population was 167.
