= Ladrovići =

Ladrovići Ladri
- Village
- Location within Croatia
- Country: Croatia
- County: Istria County
- Municipality: Poreč

Area
  - Total: 0.46 sq mi (1.2 km^{2})

Population (2021)
  - Total: 117
  - Density: 250/sq mi (98/km^{2})
- Time zone: UTC+1 (CET)
  - Summer (DST): UTC+2 (CEST)
- Postal code: 52440 Poreč
- Area code: 052

Ladrovići (Italian: Ladri) is a village in the municipality of Poreč-Parenzo, Istria in Croatia. The Croatian name Ladrovići finds its etymological roots in the Italian word ladro meaning thief or burglar.

== Demographics ==
According to the 2021 census, its population was 117.
