= Nova Vas pod Rifnikom =

Municipality in Savinja Statistical Region, Slovenia

- Location in Slovenia
- Coordinates: 46°12′30″N 15°24′41″E
- Country: Slovenia
- Traditional region: Styria
- Statistical region: Savinja
- Municipality: Šentjur
- Elevation: 270 m (890 ft)

Nova Vas pod Rifnikom (pronounced [ˈnɔːʋa ˈʋaːs pɔd ˈɾiːfnikɔm], Slovene: Nova vas pod Rifnikom, German: Neudorf) is a former settlement in the Municipality of Šentjur in eastern Slovenia. The area is part of the traditional region of Styria. The municipality is now included in the Savinja Statistical Region.

== Name ==
The name of the village was changed from Nova vas (literally, 'new village') to Nova vas pod Rifnikom ('new village below Rifnik') in 1953 in order to differentiate it from other settlements with the same name.

== Geography ==
Nova Vas pod Rifnikom lies below the northeast slope of Rifnik Hill (elevation 568 meters or 1,864 feet) above the left bank of the Voglajna River. The houses stand on a fluvial terrace, below which is a damp flood plain with meadows. The soil is loose and has a low loam content.

== History ==
Nova Vas pod Rifnikom was annexed by Šentjur in 1984, ending its existence as an independent settlement.
