= Mihatovići, Croatia =

Mihatovići Micatti
- Village
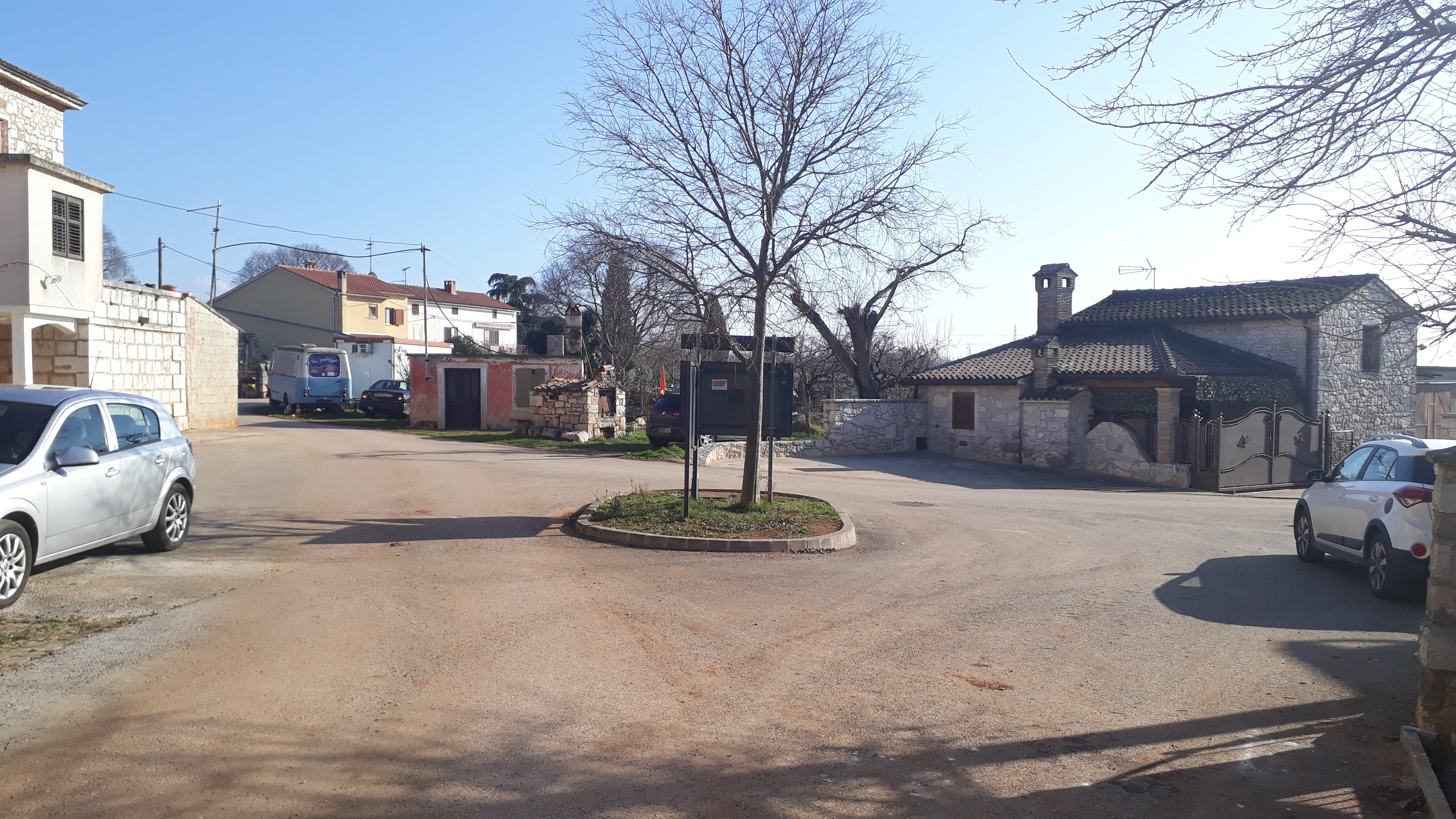

- Location within Croatia
- Coordinates: 45.2594483°N 13.6321869°E
- Country: Croatia
- County: Istria County
- Municipality: Poreč

Area
  - Total: 0.46 sq mi (1.2 km^{2})

Population (2021)
  - Total: 161
  - Density: 350/sq mi (130/km^{2})
- Time zone: UTC+1 (CET)
  - Summer (DST): UTC+2 (CEST)
- Postal code: 52446 Nova Vas
- Area code: 052

Mihatovići (Italian: Micatti) is a village in the municipality of Poreč-Parenzo, Istria in Croatia.

== Demographics ==
According to the 2021 census, its population was 161.
