= Mihatovići, Bosnia and Herzegovina =

Village in Bosnia and Herzegovina

Mihatovići
- Village
- Location within Bosnia and Herzegovina
- Coordinates: 44.5432221°N 18.5638754°E
- Country: Bosnia and Herzegovina
- Entity: Federation of Bosnia and Herzegovina
- Canton: Tuzla
- Municipality: Tuzla

Area
  - Total: 0.54 sq mi (1.41 km^{2})

Population (2013)
  - Total: 1,353
  - Density: 2,490/sq mi (960/km^{2})
- Time zone: UTC+1 (CET)
  - Summer (DST): UTC+2 (CEST)

Mihatovići is a village in the municipality of Tuzla, Tuzla Canton, Bosnia and Herzegovina.

It was a Bosnian war refugee settlement and home of 8,000 refugees, who were mainly Bosnian Muslims.

== Demographics ==
According to the 2013 census, its population was 1,353.

Ethnicity in 2013
| Ethnicity | Number | Percentage |
|---|---|---|
| Bosniaks | 1,284 | 94.9% |
| Croats | 19 | 1.4% |
| other/undeclared | 50 | 3.7% |
| Total | 1,353 | 100% |
