= Buići, Istria County =

Buići
- Village
- Location within Croatia
- Country: Croatia
- County: Istria County
- Municipality: Poreč

Area
  - Total: 0.27 sq mi (0.7 km^{2})

Population (2021)
  - Total: 134
  - Density: 500/sq mi (190/km^{2})
- Time zone: UTC+1 (CET)
  - Summer (DST): UTC+2 (CEST)
- Postal code: 52440 Poreč
- Area code: 052

Buići is a village in the municipality of Poreč, Istria in Croatia.

== Demographics ==
According to the 2021 census, its population was 134.
