= Kostanjica =

Kostanjica may refer to:

- Kostanjica, Kotor, a village in Montenegro
- Kostanjica, Croatia, a village near Grožnjan
- Koštanjica, a village near Bar, Montenegro

== See also ==
- Kostajnica (disambiguation)
