= Antonci =

Antonci may refer to:

- Antonci, Poreč, a village in Istria, Croatia
- Antonci, Grožnjan, a village in Istria, Croatia
