= Flags of Istria =

Flag of Istria County since 2002

Istria is the largest peninsula within the Adriatic Sea. The peninsula is located at the head of the Adriatic between the Gulf of Trieste and the Kvarner Gulf. It is shared by three countries: Croatia, Slovenia, and Italy. Croatia encapsulates most of the Istrian peninsula with its Istria County. The current flag of Istria was adopted on 1 July 2002.

== Current flag ==
The current flag shows Istria's coat of arms on a blue and green field. The blue symbolises the sky and sea, and the green symbolises the Istrian interior.

== Historical flags ==
Flag	Date	Use	Description
	1994 – 2002	Flag of Istria County	Never used
	1849 – 1918	Flag of Margraviate of Istria (Note: The order of colours on the flag are sometimes changed.)	Three equal horizontal fields, yellow on the top, red in the middle and blue on the bottom.

== Flags of cities and municipalities ==
=== Yugoslav period ===
Flag	Date	Use
	1969 – 1990	Flag of Municipality of Pula
	1976 – 1993	Flag of Municipality of Buje
	1921 – 1993	Flag of Municipality of Labin

=== Cities in Croatian Istria ===
Flag	Date	Use	County
	1993 – present	Flag of Buje - Buie	Istria County
	1993 – present	Flag of Buzet	Istria County
	1995 – present	Flag of Novigrad - Cittanova	Istria County
	1993 – present	Flag of Labin	Istria County
	1998 – present	Flag of Opatija	Primorje-Gorski Kotar County
	1993 – present	Flag of Poreč - Parenzo	Istria County
	1994 – present	Flag of Pazin	Istria County
	1993 – present	Flag of Pula - Pola	Istria County
	1996 – present	Flag of Rovinj - Rovigno	Istria County
	1993 – present	Flag of Umag - Umago	Istria County
	1995 – present	Flag of Vodnjan - Dignano	Istria County

=== Slovenia ===
Flag	Date	Use	Region
	1997 - present	Flag of Koper	Slovene Istria

=== Italy ===
Flag	Date	Use	Region
	Unknown	Flag of Muggia	Friuli-Venezia Giulia
