= Šterna =

Šterna Sterna
- Village
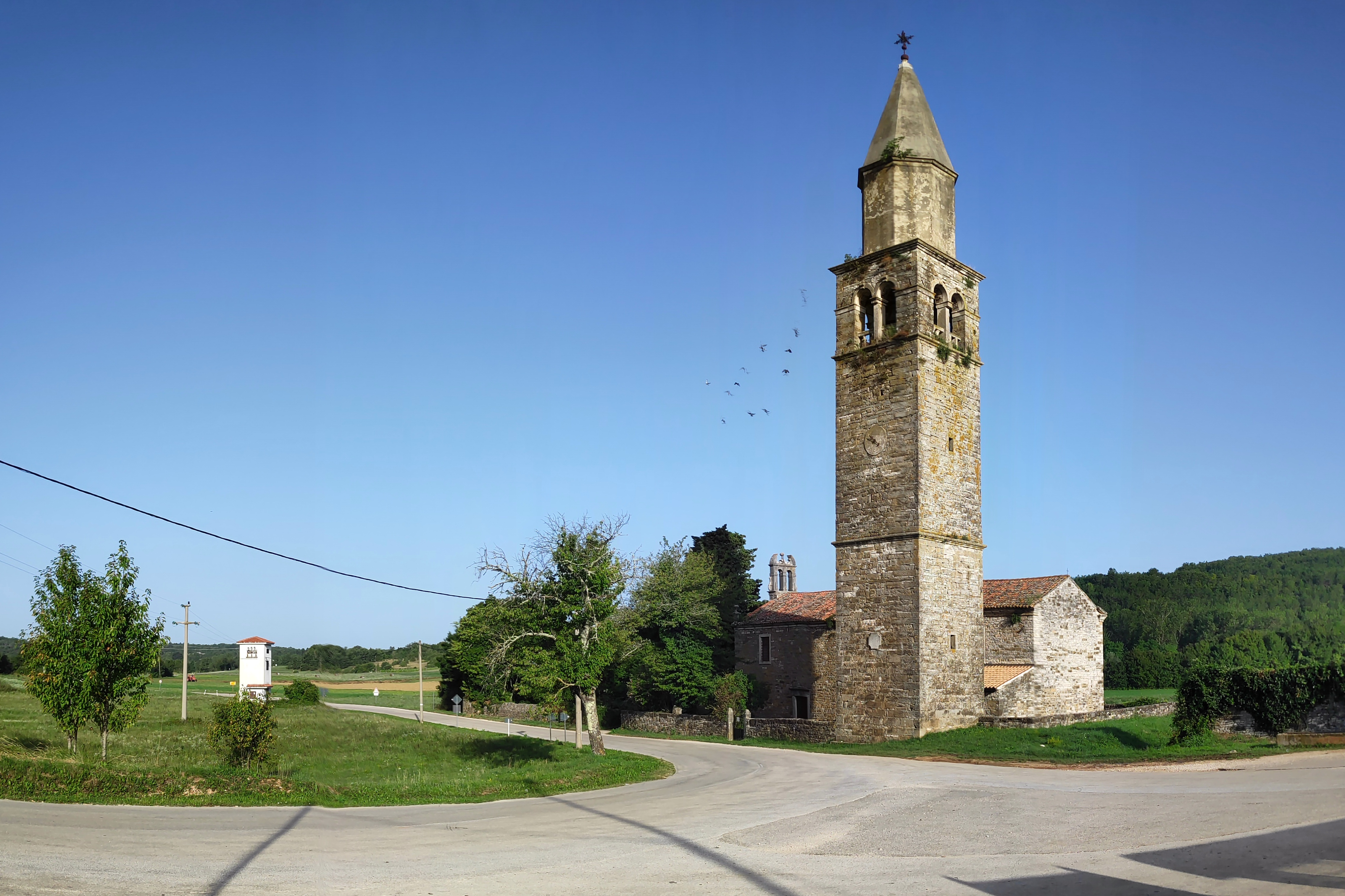

- Location within Croatia
- Coordinates: 45.4223737°N 13.7483571°E
- Country: Croatia
- County: Istria County
- Municipality: Grožnjan

Area
  - Total: 4.1 sq mi (10.7 km^{2})

Population (2021)
  - Total: 70
  - Density: 17/sq mi (6.5/km^{2})
- Time zone: UTC+1 (CET)
  - Summer (DST): UTC+2 (CEST)
- Postal code: 52428 Oprtalj
- Area code: 052

Šterna (Italian: Sterna) is a village in the municipality of Grožnjan-Grisignana in Istria, Croatia.

== Demographics ==
According to the 2021 census, its population was 70.

== History ==
Until the territorial reorganization in Croatia, Šterna was part of the old municipality of Buje.
