= Plovanija =

Plovanija may refer to:

- Plovanija, Istria County, a village near Buje, Croatia
- Plovanija, Zadar, a section of Zadar, Croatia
