= Brič =

Brič may refer to:

- Brič, Slovenia, a village near Koper
- Brič, Croatia, a village near Buje
