= Lozari =

Lozari Losari
- Village
- Location within Croatia
- Coordinates: 45.3588889°N 13.6746031°E
- Country: Croatia
- County: Istria
- Municipality: Buje

Area
  - Total: 0.54 sq mi (1.4 km^{2})

Population (2021)
  - Total: 27
  - Density: 50/sq mi (19/km^{2})
- Time zone: UTC+1 (CET)
  - Summer (DST): UTC+2 (CEST)
- Postal code: 52460 Buje
- Area code: 052

Lozari (Italian: Losari) is a village in Istria, Croatia.

== Demographics ==
According to the 2021 census, its population was 27.
