= Oskoruš =

Oskoruš Oscurus
- Village
- Location within Croatia
- Coordinates: 45.4533032°N 13.7107423°E
- Country: Croatia
- County: Istria
- Municipality: Buje

Area
  - Total: 1.4 sq mi (3.7 km^{2})

Population (2021)
  - Total: 43
  - Density: 30/sq mi (12/km^{2})
- Time zone: UTC+1 (CET)
  - Summer (DST): UTC+2 (CEST)
- Postal code: 52460 Buje
- Area code: 052

Oskoruš (Italian: Oscurus) is a village in Istria, Croatia. It is located close to the border with Slovenia.

== History ==
During the 16th and 17th centuries, the village was inhabited primarily by farming families who had arrived from Dalmatia and Herzegovina. Subsequently, it became part of the Republic of Venice, and in 1797, it passed under Habsburg rule. In 1805, Oskoruš conquered by Napoleon Bonaparte and came under French rule (becoming part of the Illyrian Provinces). Following the fall of Napoleon in 1813, the village returned to the control of the Austro-Hungarian Empire. After the Treaty of Rapallo, Oskoruš became part of Italy.During the twenty years of fascism, Oskoruš was subjected to forced Italianization carried out by the regime.After World War II, Oskoruš became part of Zone B of the Free Territory of Trieste and in 1954 officially became part of Yugoslavia.In 1991, Oskoruš came under the control of Croatia, of which it remains a part to this day.

== Demographics ==
According to the 2021 census, its population was 43.
