= Kostajnica =

Kostajnica can refer to:

- Kostajnica, Bosnia and Herzegovina (formerly Bosanska Kostajnica), a town on the right bank of river Una, in Bosnia
- Hrvatska Kostajnica, a town on the left bank of river Una, in Croatia
- Kostajnica, Doboj, a village near Doboj, Bosnia and Herzegovina
- Kostajnica, Konjic, a village near Konjic, Bosnia and Herzegovina

== See also ==
- Kostanjica (disambiguation)
