= Kućibreg =

Settlement in Istria County, Croatia

- Settlement
- Interactive map of Kućibreg
- Location of Kućibreg in Croatia
- Coordinates: 45°27′22″N 13°47′28″E
- Country: Croatia
- County: Istria County
- City: Buje

Area
  - Total: 4.8 km^{2} (1.9 sq mi)

Population (2021)
  - Total: 13
  - Density: 2.7/km^{2} (7.0/sq mi)
- Time zone: UTC+1 (CET)
  - Summer (DST): UTC+2 (CEST)
- Postal code: 52460 Buje
- Area code: +385 (0)52

Kućibreg is a settlement in the City of Buje in Croatia. In 2021, its population was 13.

== Demographics ==
Kućibreg: Population trends 1857–2021
v

population	173	186	194	200	211	251	245	240	235	108	84	56	34	21	27	19	13
	1857	1869	1880	1890	1900	1910	1921	1931	1948	1953	1961	1971	1981	1991	2001	2011	2021

Sources: Croatian Bureau of Statistics publications
