= Grožnjan =

Grožnjan Grisignana
- Municipality
- Grožnjan Municipality; Općina Grožnjan - Comune di Grisignana
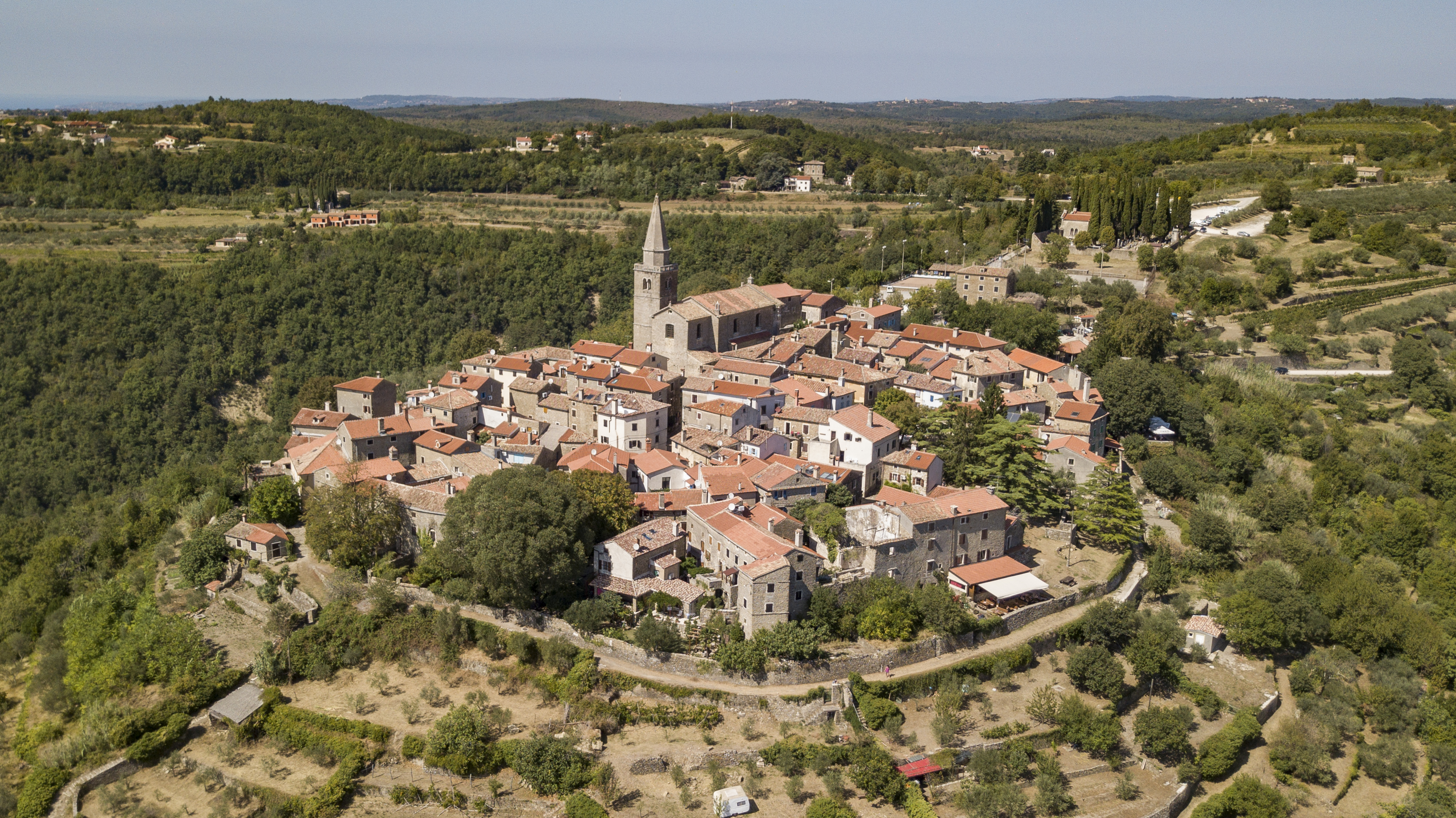
- View of Grožnjan

- Flag
- Nickname: The town of artists
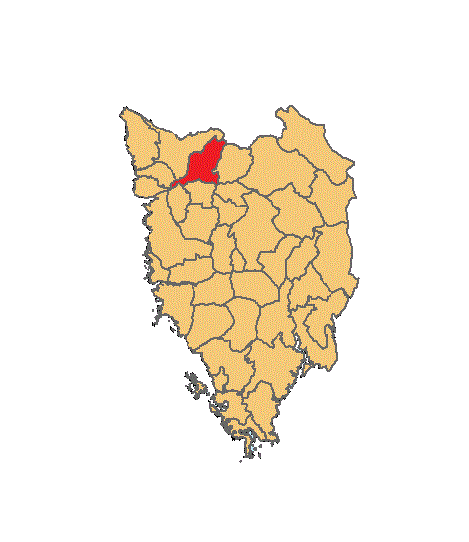
- Location of Grožnjan municipality in Istria
- Interactive map of Grožnjan
- Location within Croatia
- Coordinates: 45°23′N 13°43′E
- Country: Croatia
- County: Istria County

Government
  - Mayor: Claudio Stocovaz (IDS)

Area
  - Municipality: 26.2 sq mi (67.8 km^{2})
  - Urban: 3.4 sq mi (8.7 km^{2})

Population (2021)
  - Municipality: 656
  - Density: 25.1/sq mi (9.68/km^{2})
  - Urban: 142
  - Urban density: 42/sq mi (16/km^{2})
- Time zone: UTC+1 (CET)
  - Summer (DST): UTC+2 (CEST)
- Postal code: 52460 Buje
- Area code: 052
- Website: groznjan-grisignana.hr

Grožnjan (Italian: Grisignana; Venetian: Grizinjana) is a settlement and a municipality in Croatia. It is part of Istria County, which takes up most of the Istrian peninsula. Around 36% of the municipality's population is Italian.

== History ==
=== Early history ===
In Grožnjan are found ancient Roman artifacts and near Grožnjan is the remains of a Roman house, but the first mention of Grožnjan dates from 1102, when Margrave of Istria Ulric II and his wife Adelaida granted their land to Patriarch of Aquileia. In this document the fort is called Castrum Grisiniana. In 1238 Grožnjan was the property of Vicardo I Pietrapalosa. In 1286, Grožnjan fort was lent to the Aquileian patriarch during war with Venice but changed sides in 1287, and Grožnjan was given to Venice.

Vicardo's son Pietro inherited Grožnjan after his father's death in 1329, and when he died in 1339 it again became the patriarch's property. The patriarch rented it to a Friuli noble family, de Castello. In 1354 Grožnjan's new owner became Volrich, or Ulrich, Reifenberg, who in 1358 sold it to Venice for 4,000 ducats in order to pay his debts. Volrich was a son of Deitalm, a descendant of Aquileian patriarch Volcher, and in 1356, during the war between Venice and Hungary, his army, entrenched in Grožnjan, strongly resisted the Hungarian army. Yet it seems that at the same time Volrich negotiated the surrendering of Grožnjan in Venice.

=== Venetian Republic ===
Venice took Grožnjan over in 1358 and ruled until the demise of the Venetian Republic in 1797. In 1359 the Umag captain Pietro Dolfin moved to his new residence in Grožnjan, and in 1360 and 1367 he fortified the town walls and renovated the palace.

Captain's Office moved from Grožnjan to Raspo in 1394, when a central rule was established for the whole area. Since then Grožnjan was governed by Venetian noblemen who were given the title of "Mayor". From the early 16th century Grožnjan's mayors were chosen among Koper noblemen. In the 15th century judicial duties were performed by the Pietrapelosas, and in 1446 the town walls were fortified in order to protect it from possible Turkish attacks. After the terrible plague in 1630 the Grožnjan area became almost completely deserted. In order to revitalize the area the St. Mark's Republic brought Italian families from Veneto and Friuli; these were mostly tradesmen who settled in towns. Settlers were invited by the Republic of Venice to cultivate the abandoned land in some hamlets around Grožnjan. Most of the settlers were Morlachs from Dalmatia, but also Slavic people, Albanians and Greeks, all refugees of the Ottoman Empire.

All settlers in Istria were given free land and were exempt from fiscal duties and work obligations for twenty years; the only condition was to cultivate the land within five years. The economic success of the colonization of villages was reflected in the towns as well: trade and transportation developed and demographics improved.

=== Austrian Empire ===
After the fall of Napoleon's Empire in 1813, his Illyrian Provinces, including Grožnjan, became part of the Austrian Empire. In 1816 the Austrian Emperor Francis II visited Grožnjan on his tour through Istria and met with the local clergy and population.

During Austrian rule, the Grožnjan area flourished. The building of the Parenzana railroad in 1902 enhanced the development of trade and agriculture. Wine, olive oil, eggs, and other produce were sold in Koper and Trieste. According to the 1910 census, the settlement of Grožnjan had 1,658, and the municipal area had 4,028 inhabitants. The town had a doctor, a post office, a school, a lawyer, a notary public, an oil processing plant, a bakery, groceries and clothing stores, two butchers, several inns, and various trade shops (shoemakers, blacksmiths, tailors, carpenters, etc.).

=== Kingdom of Italy ===
The dissolution of the Austrian Empire, the subsequent Italian rule and the Great Depression had its consequences. In the 1920s people started to emigrate, looking for work in Trieste and overseas. During the rule of the Kingdom of Italy Grožnjan attained waterworks, the area was electrified, and the Mirna river valley was reclaimed.

=== SFR Yugoslavia ===
After the Second World War, Istria was divided into two parts, the Yugoslav one and the Free Territory of Trieste, which was divided into Zone A, controlled by the US Army, and Zone B, controlled by the Yugoslav Army. Grožnjan becomes a part of Zone B. On October 5, 1954, the London Memorandum was signed and Zone A was assigned to Italy, and Zone B to the People's Federal Republic of Yugoslavia. In 1975 the Treaty of Osimo divided the Free Territory of Trieste and Grožnjan became part of Yugoslavia.

The London Memorandum provided the population with the option of emigration to Italy. The new Yugoslavia's emergent communist system and its application, along with lingering hostilities between Italians and Yugoslavs (like the murder of priest Francesco Bonifacio), contributed to a large wave of emigration (part of the Istrian–Dalmatian exodus). By April 1956, 2/3 of the population emigrated from the area to Italy.

In 1955 Grožnjan lost its municipality status and became part of the municipality of Buje. In 1965, when the Town of Arts was founded, some of the housing was given to artists from Croatia, Slovenia, and Vojvodina, and some were assigned to the Cultural Centre of the International Music Youth Federation in 1969. In 1993 Grožnjan got its municipality status again.

== Demographics ==
In the 2001 census, the municipality of Grožnjan had 785 inhabitants, of which 51.2% were Italians. This made Grožnjan the only municipality with a majority share of ethnic Italians in Croatia.

In the 2011 census, the whole of Grožnjan Municipality had 736 inhabitants, while the settlement of Grožnjan itself had 164 inhabitants. The ethnic composition of the municipality in 2011 was 39.40% Italians, 29.62% Croats, 18.21% regionally declared, and 2.17% Slovenes. The native language in the municipality was 56.52% Italian, 37.36% Croatian, and 2.72% Slovene.

In the 2021 census, the whole of Grožnjan Municipality had 656 inhabitants, while the settlement of Grožnjan itself had 142 inhabitants. The ethnic composition of the municipality in 2021 was 50% Croats, 35.82% Italians, 6.25% regionally declared, and 1.83% Slovenes. The native language in the municipality was 49.24% Croatian, 44.51% Italian, and 2.59% Slovene.

In 2021, the municipality consisted of following 10 settlements:

- Antonci - Antonzi, population 49
- Bijele Zemlje - Terre Bianche, population 70
- Grožnjan - Grisignana, population 142
- Kostanjica - Castagna, population 61
- Kuberton - Cuberton, population 22
- Makovci - Macovzi, population 92
- Martinčići - Martincici, population 111
- Šterna - Sterna, population 70
- Vrnjak - Vergnacco, uninhabited
- Završje - Piemonte d'Istria, population 39
Grožnjan: Population trends 1857–2021
v

population	3223	3414	3572	3643	3744	4011	3992	3905	3475	2344	1861	1078	914	854	785	736	656
	1857	1869	1880	1890	1900	1910	1921	1931	1948	1953	1961	1971	1981	1991	2001	2011	2021

Sources: Croatian Bureau of Statistics publications

=== Language ===
Italian is co-official with Croatian on the municipal level in Grožnjan. As of 2023, most of the legal requirements for the fulfillment of bilingual standards have been carried out. Official buildings have Italian signage, as do street signs, traffic signs and seals. Italian is used on most but not all official documents. There public legal and administrative employees proficient in the language. Preserving traditional Italian place names and assigning street names to Italian historical figures is legally mandated and carried out.

== Culture ==
Grožnjan is today known as "Town of artists". It has about 20 art galleries, it hosts summer film school, and it has become an international center of Croatian music youth. Grožnjan has an annual jazz festival "Jazz is Back-BP", that was started by Boško Petrović, attracting international musicians, such as Georgie Fame in 2007, Mike Sponza. In 2008 it won the European award for best small jazz festival. It is held for two or three weeks, in the second half of July. Grožnjan also has an annual painting festival, the Ex Tempore, hosting more than 300 artists from the whole Europe.

== Gallery ==
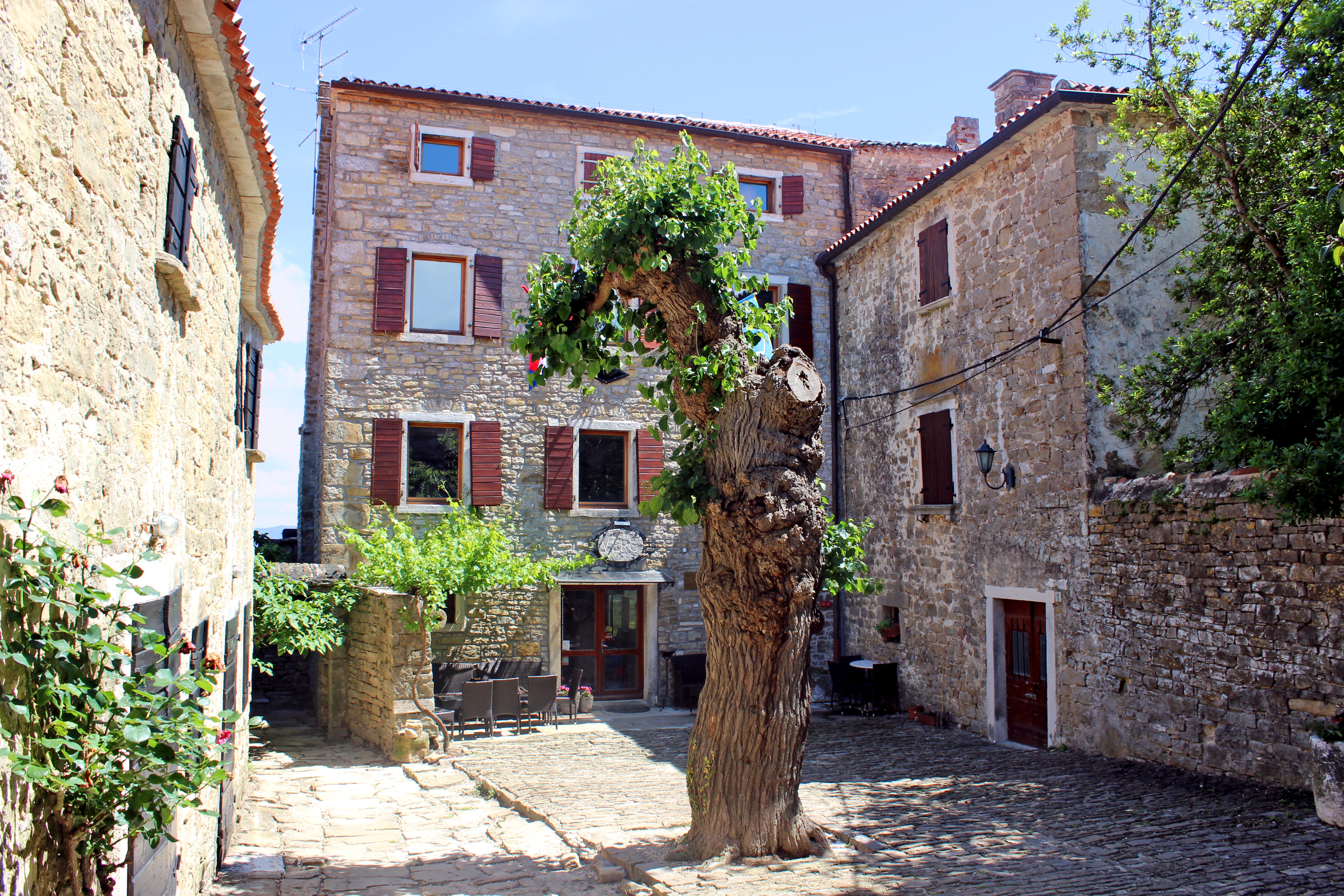
Houses in Grožnjan

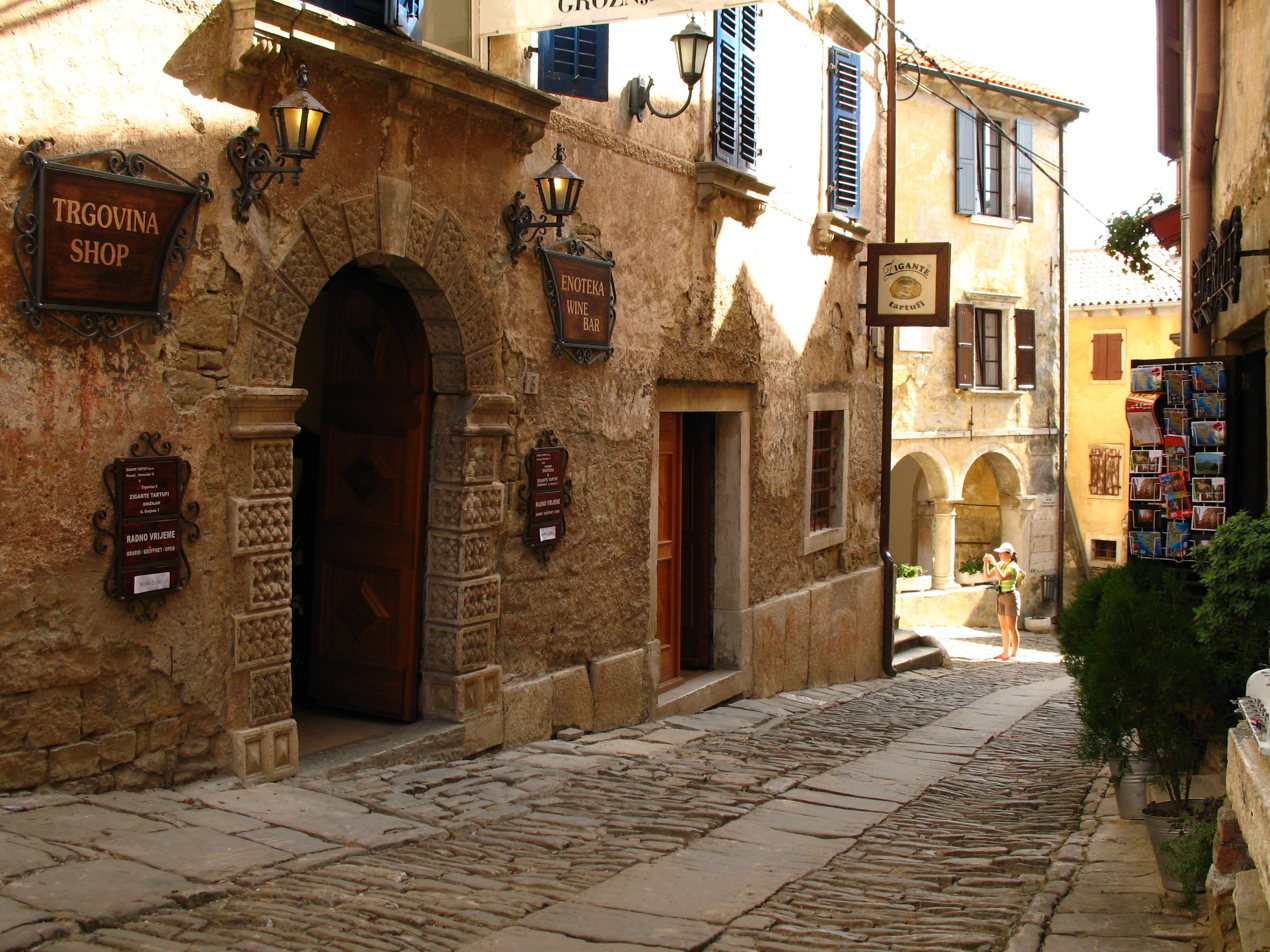
Shop in Grožnjan

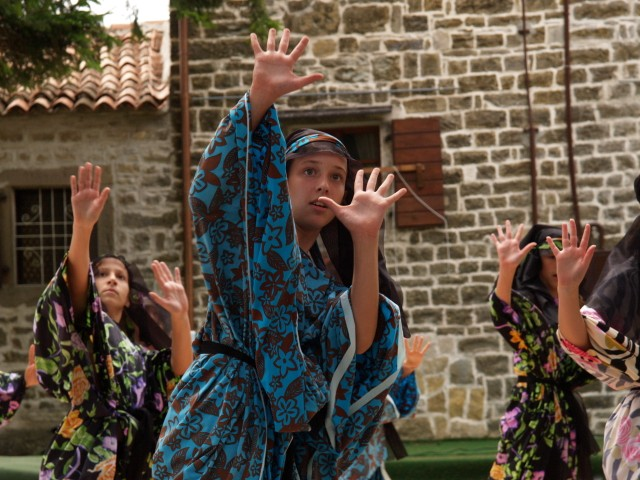
Ballet Course in Grožnjan

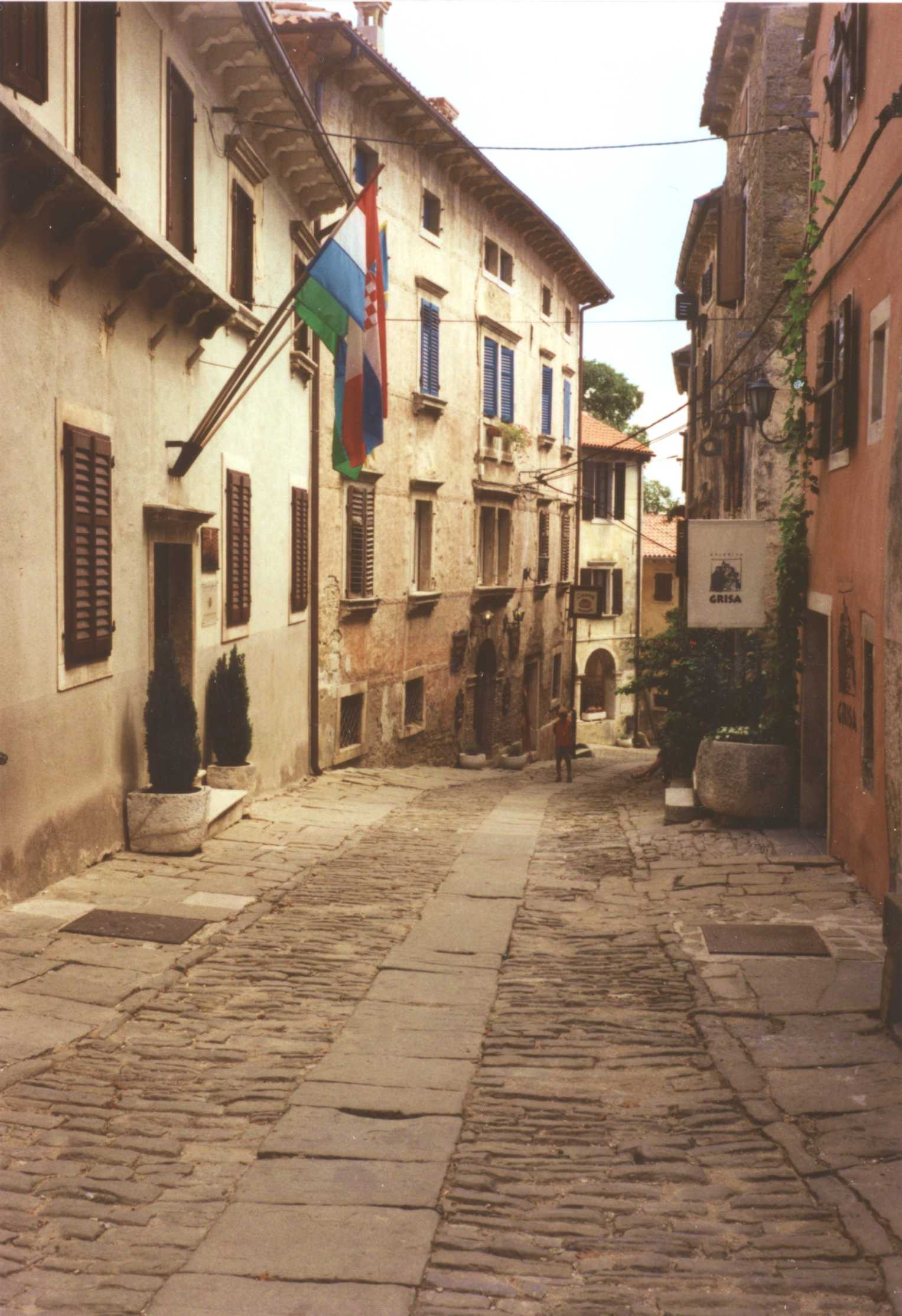
Typical alley

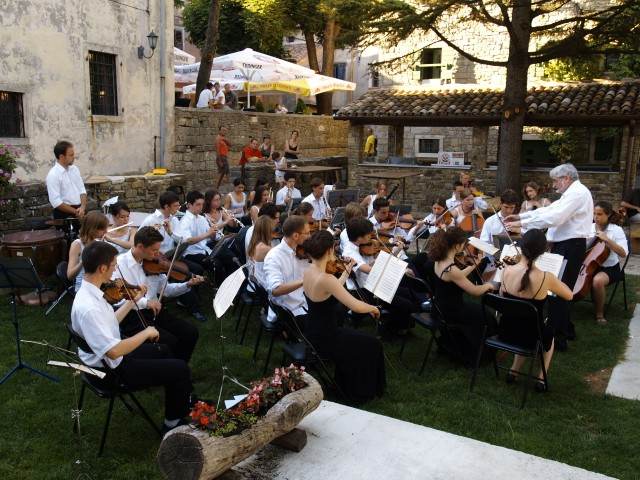
Summer School

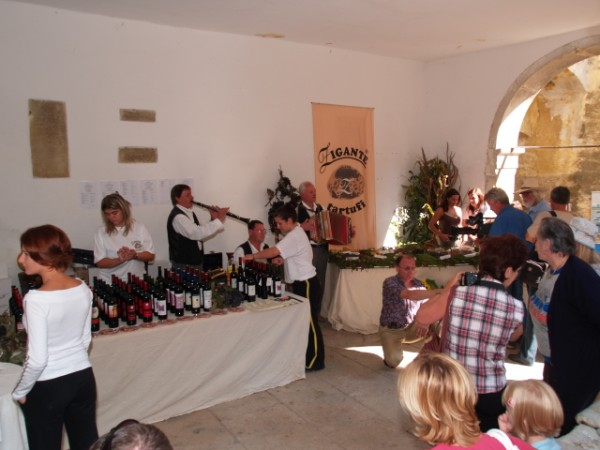
Wine Exhibition

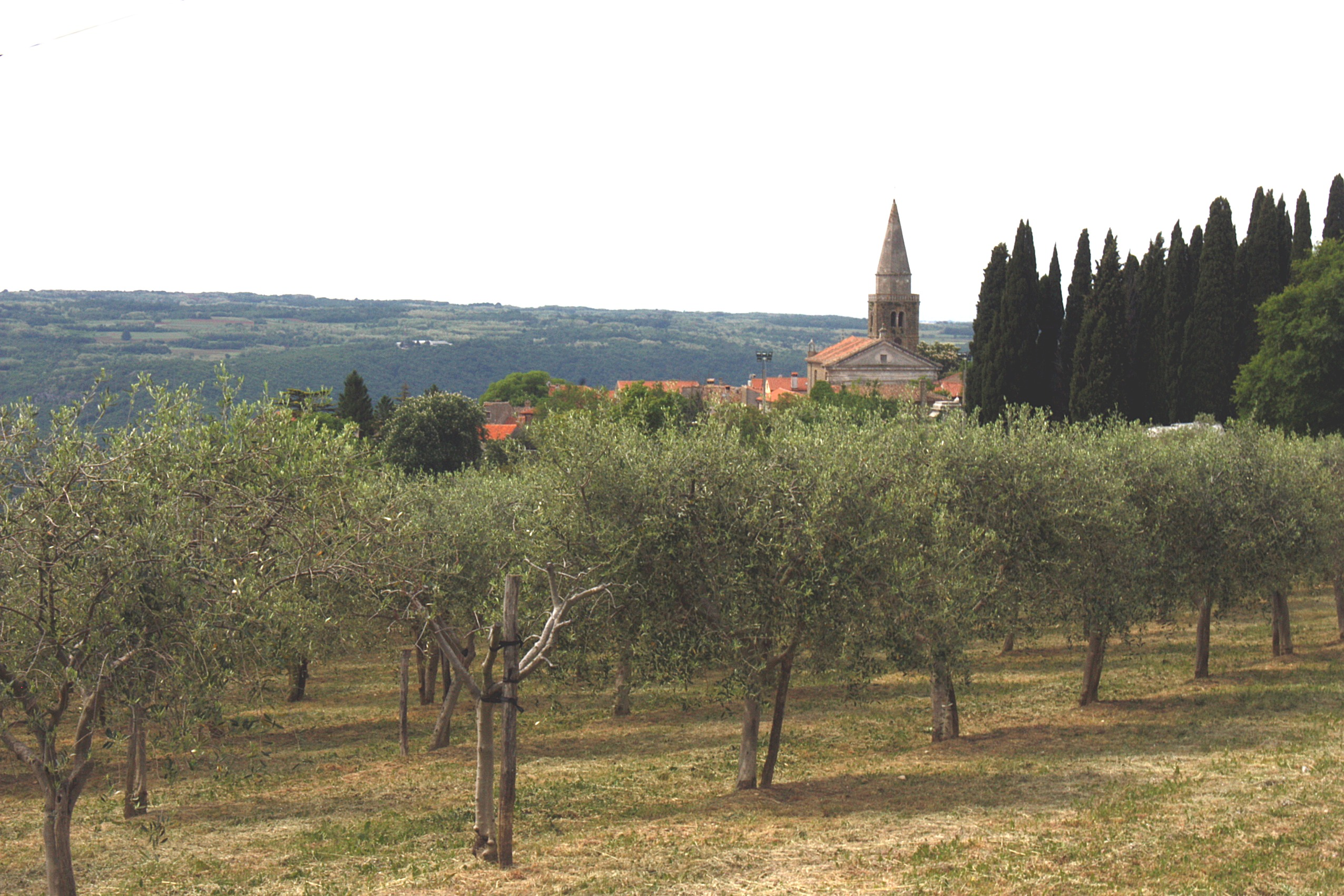
Olives near Grožnjan

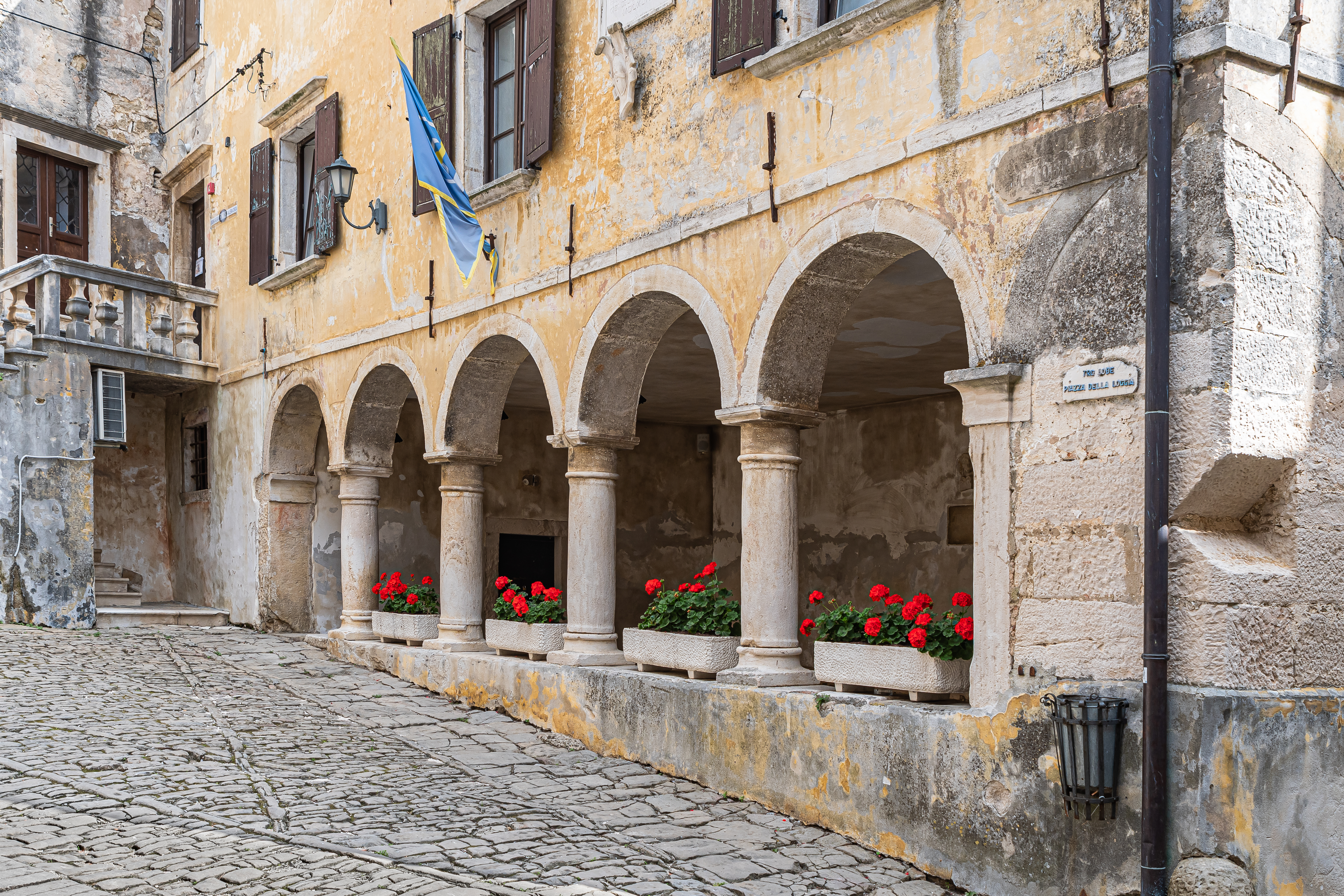
Loggia of Grožnjan

== See also ==
- List of Glagolitic inscriptions (16th century)
