= Kaldanija =

Kaldanija Caldania
- Village
- Location within Croatia
- Country: Croatia
- County: Istria
- Municipality: Buje

Area
  - Total: 1.2 sq mi (3.1 km^{2})

Population (2021)
  - Total: 273
  - Density: 230/sq mi (88/km^{2})
- Time zone: UTC+1 (CET)
  - Summer (DST): UTC+2 (CEST)
- Postal code: 52460 Buje
- Area code: 052

Kaldanija (Italian: Caldania) is a village in Croatia. It is connected by the D200 highway.

== Demographics ==
According to the 2021 census, its population was 273. It was 126 in 2001.

== Bibliography ==
=== Biology ===
- Šašić, Martina; Nahirnić, Ana; Tarmann, Gerhard M. (2016-12-31). "Zygaenidae (Lepidoptera) in the Lepidoptera collections of the Croatian Natural History Museum". Natura Croatica: Periodicum Musei Historiae Naturalis Croatici. 25 (2): 233–248. doi:10.20302/NC.2016.25.19. eISSN 1848-7386.
