= D200 (disambiguation) =

D200 refers to the Nikon D200, a camera

D200 may also refer to:

- D200 road, a state road in Croatia
- Dodge D200, a pickup truck
