= Merišće =

Merišće Merischie
- Village
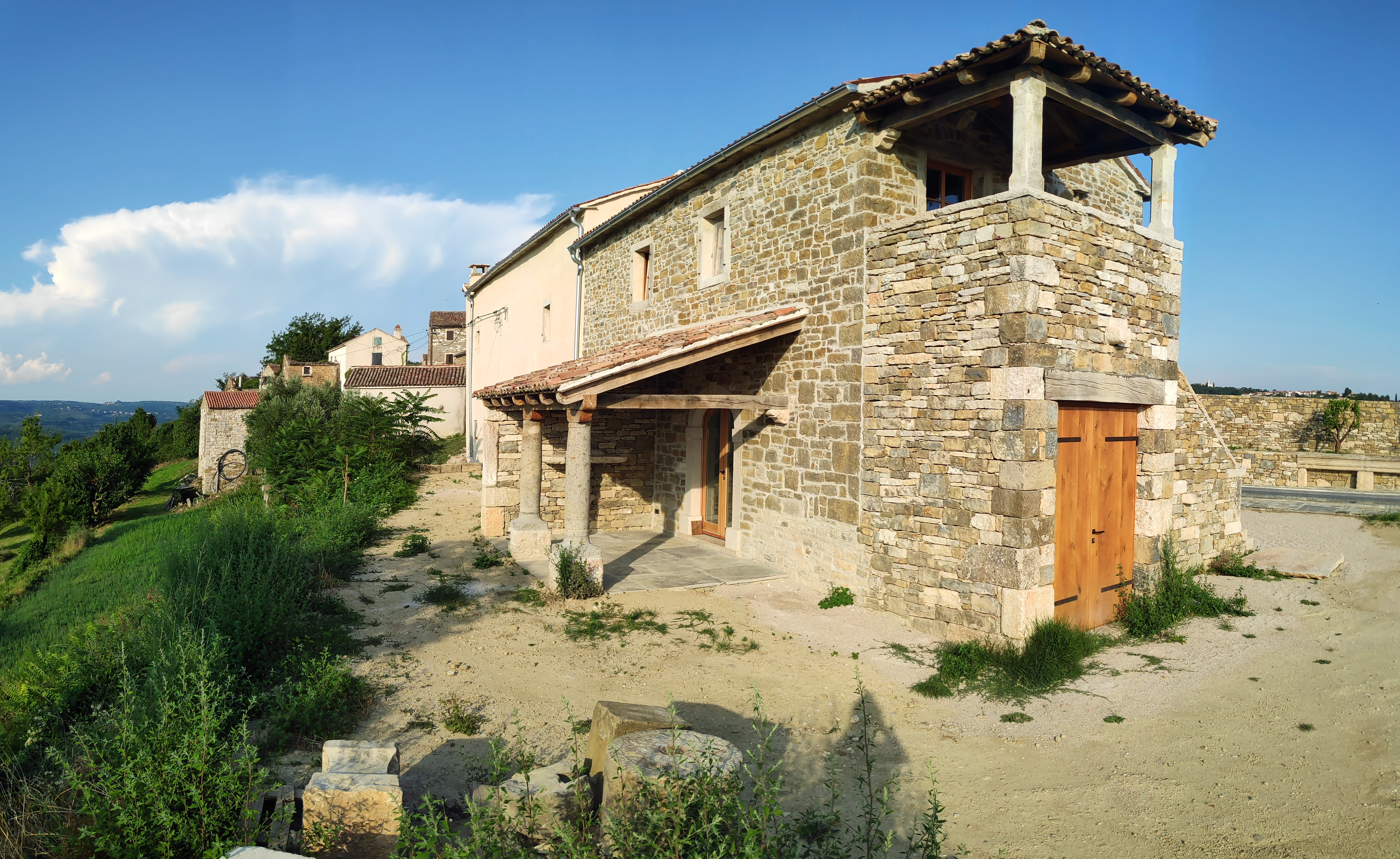

- Location within Croatia
- Coordinates: 45.4443415°N 13.681139°E
- Country: Croatia
- County: Istria
- Municipality: Buje

Area
  - Total: 1.7 sq mi (4.5 km^{2})

Population (2021)
  - Total: 47
  - Density: 27/sq mi (10/km^{2})
- Time zone: UTC+1 (CET)
  - Summer (DST): UTC+2 (CEST)
- Postal code: 52460 Buje
- Area code: 052

Merišće (Italian: Merischie) is a village in Istria, Croatia.

== Demographics ==
According to the 2021 census, its population was 47.
