= Makovci =

Makovci Macovzi
- Village
- Location within Croatia
- Coordinates: 45.391686°N 13.7518284°E
- Country: Croatia
- County: Istria County
- Municipality: Grožnjan

Area
  - Total: 2.9 sq mi (7.6 km^{2})

Population (2021)
  - Total: 92
  - Density: 31/sq mi (12/km^{2})
- Time zone: UTC+1 (CET)
  - Summer (DST): UTC+2 (CEST)
- Postal code: 52429 Grožnjan
- Area code: 052

Makovci (Italian: Macovzi) is a village in the municipality of Grožnjan-Grisignana in Istria, Croatia.

== Demographics ==
According to the 2021 census, its population was 92.
