= Triban, Croatia =

Triban Tribano
- Village
- Location within Croatia
- Coordinates: 45°24′07″N 13°41′28″E
- Country: Croatia
- County: Istria
- Municipality: Buje

Area
  - Total: 1.4 sq mi (3.5 km^{2})

Population (2021)
  - Total: 99
  - Density: 73/sq mi (28/km^{2})
- Time zone: UTC+1 (CET)
  - Summer (DST): UTC+2 (CEST)
- Postal code: 52460 Buje
- Area code: 052

Triban (Italian: Tribano) is a village in the municipality of Buje, in northern Istria in Croatia.

== Demographics ==
According to the 2021 census, its population was 99. In 2001 it had a population of 150.
