= Brdo, Buje =

Brdo Berda
- Village
- Location within Croatia
- Coordinates: 45.4457678°N 13.753377°E
- Country: Croatia
- County: Istria
- Municipality: Buje

Area
  - Total: 1.3 sq mi (3.4 km^{2})

Population (2021)
  - Total: 13
  - Density: 9.9/sq mi (3.8/km^{2})
- Time zone: UTC+1 (CET)
  - Summer (DST): UTC+2 (CEST)
- Postal code: 52460 Buje
- Area code: 052

Brdo (Italian: Collalto or Berda) is a village in Istria, Croatia.

== Demographics ==
According to the 2021 census, its population was 13.
