= Marušići, Buje =

Marušići Marussici
- Village
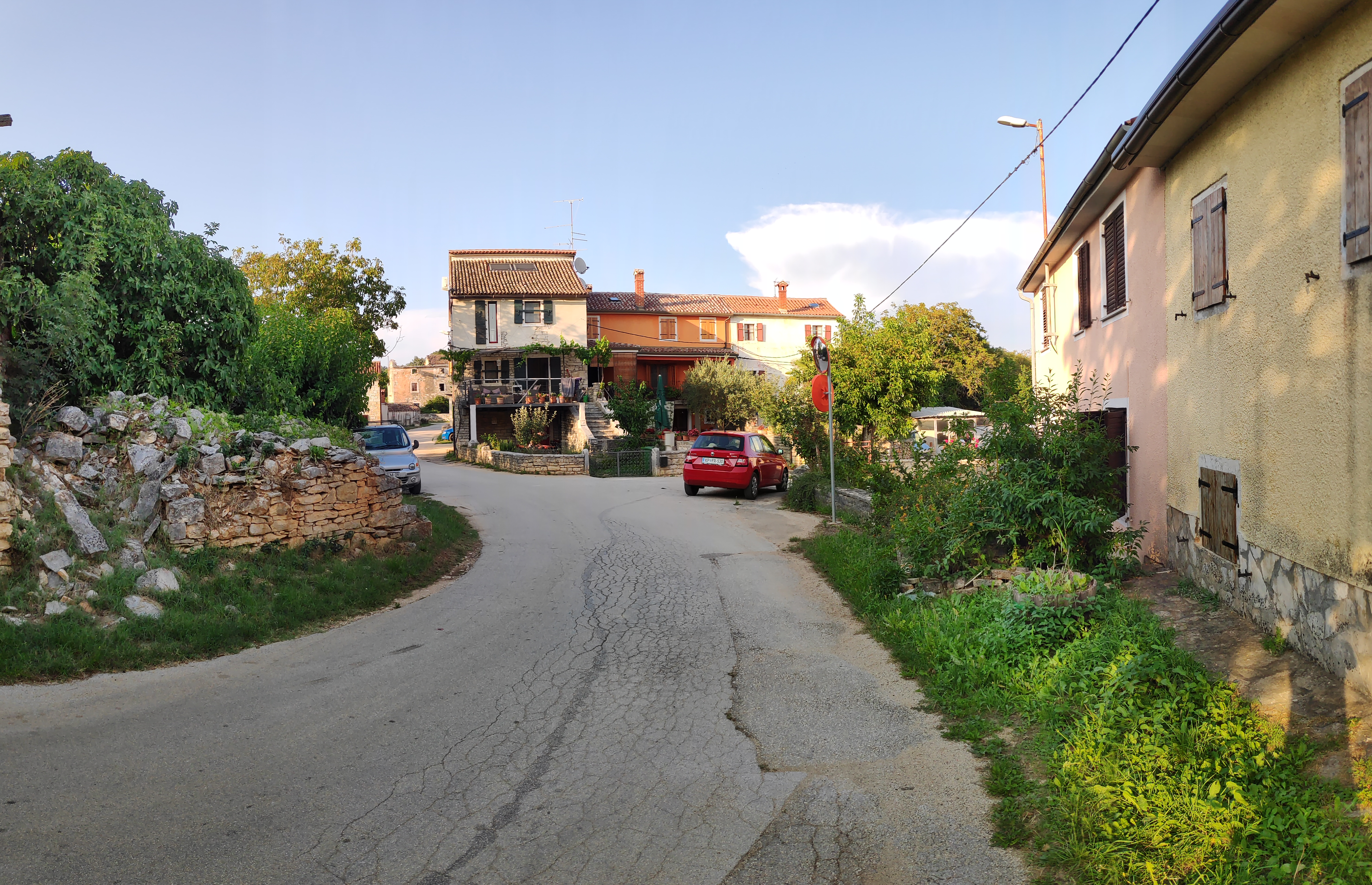

- Location within Croatia
- Coordinates: 45.4278381°N 13.7098019°E
- Country: Croatia
- County: Istria
- Municipality: Buje

Area
  - Total: 2.3 sq mi (5.9 km^{2})

Population (2021)
  - Total: 147
  - Density: 65/sq mi (25/km^{2})
- Time zone: UTC+1 (CET)
  - Summer (DST): UTC+2 (CEST)
- Postal code: 52460 Buje
- Area code: 052

Marušići (Italian: Marussici) is a village in Istria, Croatia.

== Demographics ==
According to the 2021 census, its population was 147.
