= Momjan =

Momjan Momiano
- Village
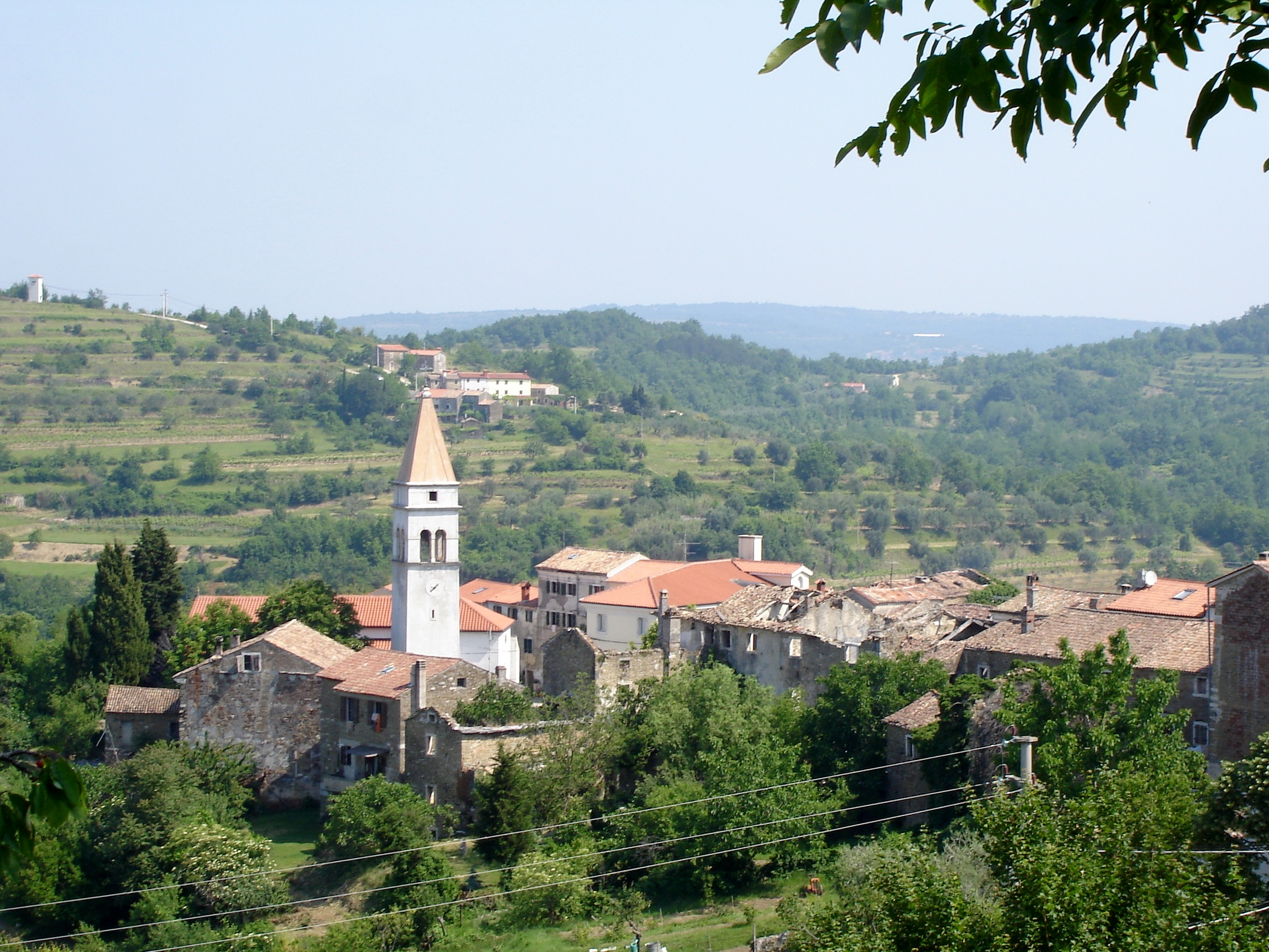

- Location within Croatia
- Coordinates: 45°26′20″N 13°42′32″E
- Country: Croatia
- County: Istria
- Municipality: Buje

Area
  - Total: 2.8 sq mi (7.2 km^{2})

Population (2021)
  - Total: 239
  - Density: 86/sq mi (33/km^{2})
- Time zone: UTC+1 (CET)
  - Summer (DST): UTC+2 (CEST)
- Postal code: 52462 Buje
- Area code: 052

Momjan (Italian: Momiano) is a village in the municipality of Buje, in northern Istria in Croatia.

== Demographics ==
According to the 2021 census, its population was 239. In 2001 it had a population of 289.
