= Kršete =

Kršete Carsette
- Village
- Location within Croatia
- Coordinates: 45.4083794°N 13.5976807°E
- Country: Croatia
- County: Istria
- Municipality: Buje

Area
  - Total: 1.5 sq mi (3.9 km^{2})

Population (2021)
  - Total: 94
  - Density: 62/sq mi (24/km^{2})
- Time zone: UTC+1 (CET)
  - Summer (DST): UTC+2 (CEST)
- Postal code: 52460 Buje
- Area code: 052

Kršete (Italian: Carsette) is a village in Istria, Croatia.

== Demographics ==
According to the 2021 census, its population was 94.
