= Buroli =

- Village
- Location within Croatia
- Coordinates: 45.3936492°N 13.5917033°E
- Country: Croatia
- County: Istria
- Municipality: Buje

Area
  - Total: 0.39 sq mi (1.0 km^{2})

Population (2021)
  - Total: 73
  - Density: 190/sq mi (73/km^{2})
- Time zone: UTC+1 (CET)
  - Summer (DST): UTC+2 (CEST)
- Postal code: 52460 Buje
- Area code: 052

Buroli is a village in Istria, Croatia.

== Demographics ==
According to the 2021 census, its population was 73.
