= Martinčići =

Martinčići Martincici
- Village
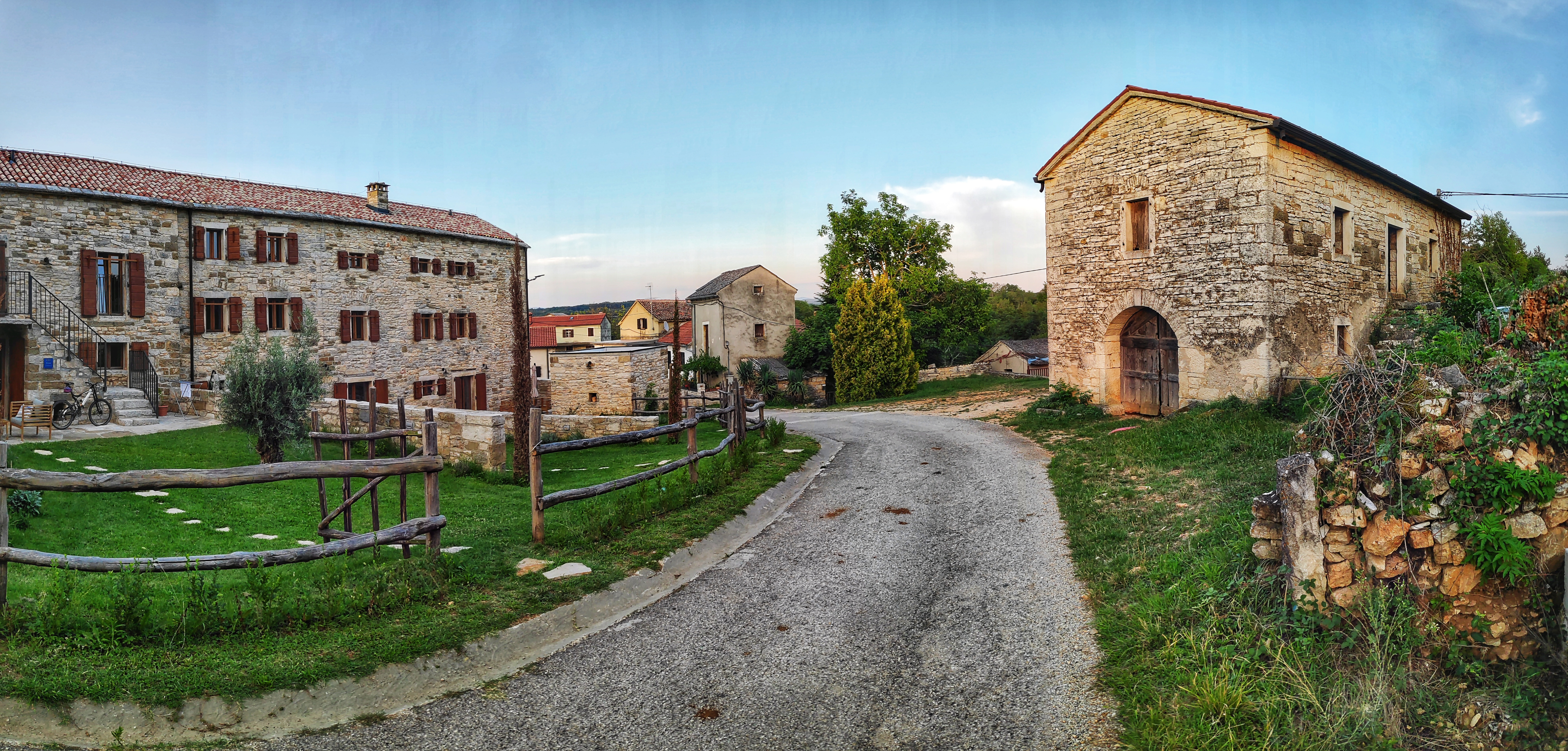

- Location within Croatia
- Coordinates: 45.4006383°N 13.7122609°E
- Country: Croatia
- County: Istria County
- Municipality: Grožnjan

Area
  - Total: 4.0 sq mi (10.3 km^{2})

Population (2021)
  - Total: 111
  - Density: 27.9/sq mi (10.8/km^{2})
- Time zone: UTC+1 (CET)
  - Summer (DST): UTC+2 (CEST)
- Postal code: 52429 Grožnjan
- Area code: 052

Martinčići (Italian: Martincici) is a village in the municipality of Grožnjan-Grisignana in Istria, Croatia.

== Demographics ==
According to the 2021 census, its population was 111.
