= Završje, Istria County =

Završje Piemonte d'Istria
- Village
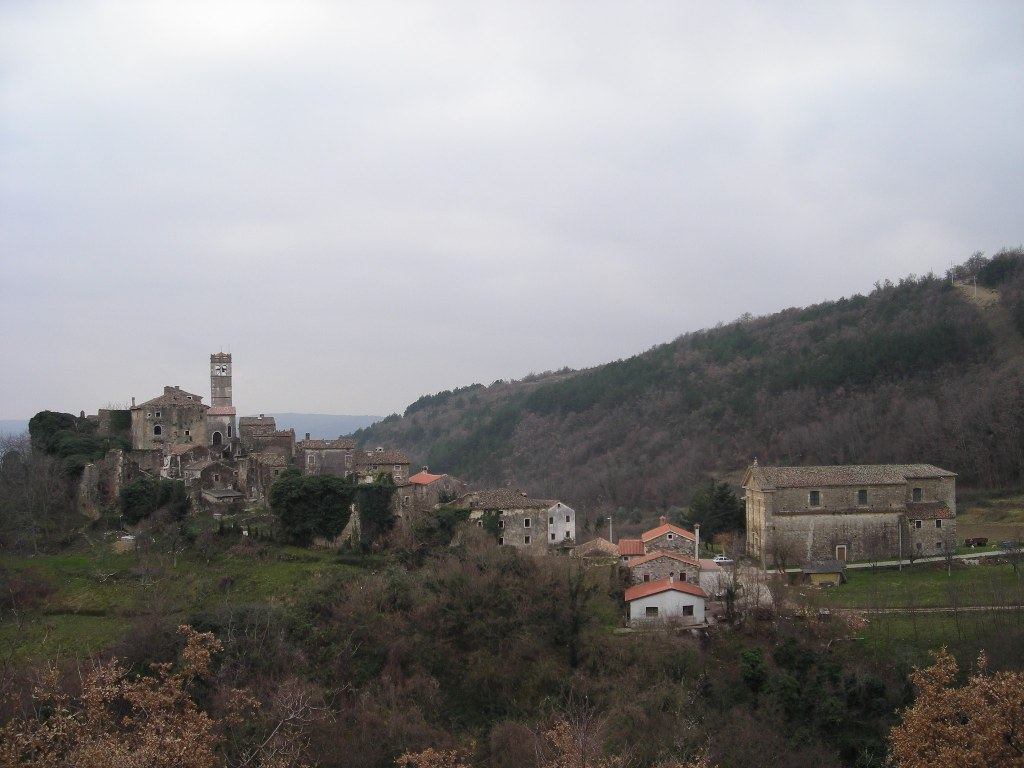

- Location within Croatia
- Coordinates: 45.367282°N 13.7467664°E
- Country: Croatia
- County: Istria County
- Municipality: Grožnjan

Area
  - Total: 2.0 sq mi (5.3 km^{2})

Population (2021)
  - Total: 39
  - Density: 19/sq mi (7.4/km^{2})
- Time zone: UTC+1 (CET)
  - Summer (DST): UTC+2 (CEST)
- Postal code: 52429 Grožnjan
- Area code: 052

Završje (Italian: Piemonte d'Istria) is a village in the municipality of Grožnjan-Grisignana in Istria, Croatia.

== Demographics ==
According to the 2021 census, its population was 39.
