= Kuberton =

Kuberton Cuberton
- Village
- Location within Croatia
- Coordinates: 45.4250574°N 13.743511°E
- Country: Croatia
- County: Istria County
- Municipality: Grožnjan

Area
  - Total: 2.4 sq mi (6.2 km^{2})

Population (2021)
  - Total: 22
  - Density: 9.2/sq mi (3.5/km^{2})
- Time zone: UTC+1 (CET)
  - Summer (DST): UTC+2 (CEST)
- Postal code: 52462 Momjan
- Area code: 052

Kuberton (Italian: Cuberton) is a village in the municipality of Grožnjan-Grisignana in Istria, Croatia.

== Demographics ==
According to the 2021 census, its population was 22.
