= Gamboci =

Gamboci Gambozzi
- Village
- Location within Croatia
- Coordinates: 45.428182°N 13.6044119°E
- Country: Croatia
- County: Istria
- Municipality: Buje

Area
  - Total: 1.9 sq mi (4.9 km^{2})

Population (2021)
  - Total: 100
  - Density: 53/sq mi (20/km^{2})
- Time zone: UTC+1 (CET)
  - Summer (DST): UTC+2 (CEST)
- Postal code: 52460 Buje
- Area code: 052

Gamboci (Italian: Gambozzi) is a village in Istria, Croatia.

== Demographics ==
According to the 2021 census, its population was 100.
