= Krasica (Buje) =

Krasica Crasizza
- Village
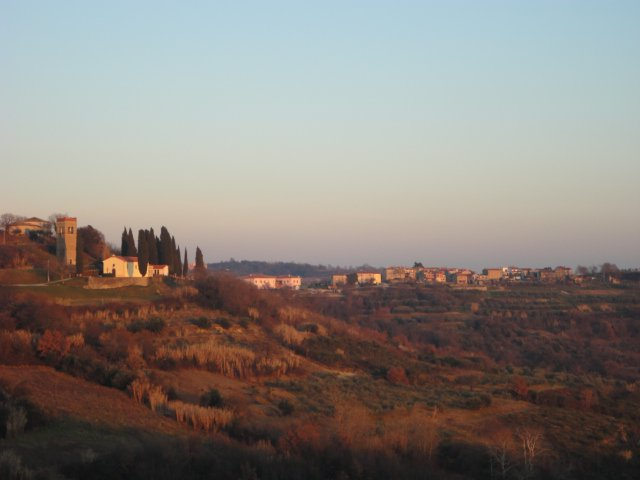

- Location within Croatia
- Coordinates: 45°22′55″N 13°41′31″E
- Country: Croatia
- County: Istria
- Municipality: Buje

Area
  - Total: 3.2 sq mi (8.2 km^{2})

Population (2021)
  - Total: 158
  - Density: 50/sq mi (19/km^{2})
- Time zone: UTC+1 (CET)
  - Summer (DST): UTC+2 (CEST)
- Postal code: 52460 Buje
- Area code: 052

Krasica (Italian: Crasizza) is a village in the municipality of Buje, in northern Istria in Croatia.

== Demographics ==
According to the 2021 census, its population was 158. In 2001 it had a population of 152.
