= Kostanjica, Croatia =

Kostanjica Castagna
- Village
- Location within Croatia
- Coordinates: 45.3650064°N 13.7307196°E
- Country: Croatia
- County: Istria County
- Municipality: Grožnjan

Area
  - Total: 1.5 sq mi (3.9 km^{2})

Population (2021)
  - Total: 61
  - Density: 41/sq mi (16/km^{2})
- Time zone: UTC+1 (CET)
  - Summer (DST): UTC+2 (CEST)
- Postal code: 52429 Grožnjan
- Area code: 052

Kostanjica (Italian: Castagna) is a village in the municipality of Grožnjan-Grisignana in Istria, Croatia. Perched above the Ponte Porton valley and views of the Mirna River.

== History ==
First recorded mention in 1102 under the name Villa de Castan, when it was gifted to the Church of Aquileia by Margrave Ulrich II of Istria. The village played a role as an extension of the defensive system of nearby Završje in medieval times, with remnants of its walls still visible. Its architectural highlights the parish church dedicated to the Blessed Virgin Mary and Saints Peter and Paul, originally reconstructed in 1500 and expanded in 1769, and a Venetian-style bell tower

== Demographics ==
According to the 2021 census, its population was 61.
