= Plovanija, Istria County =

Plovanija Plovania
- Village
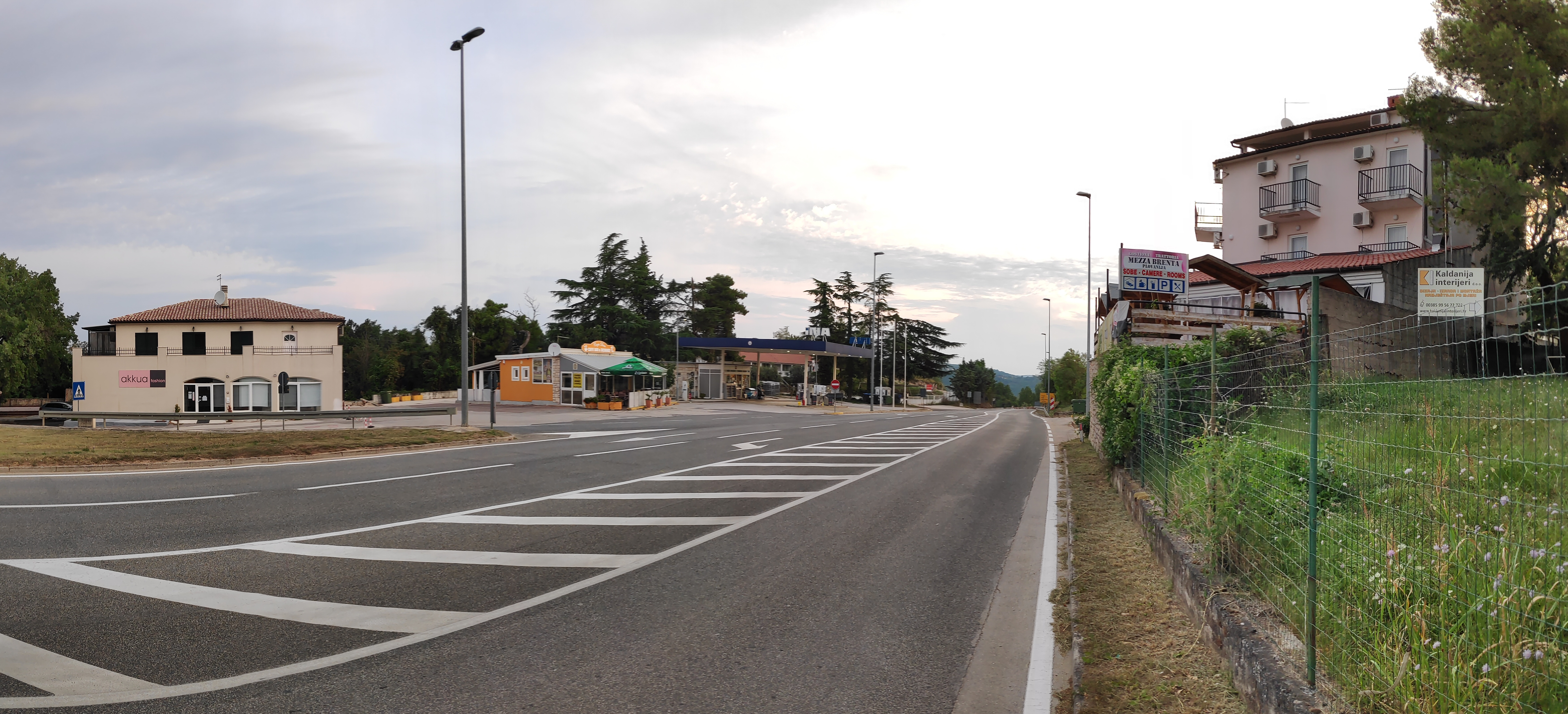

- Location within Croatia
- Coordinates: 45°27′N 13°38′E
- Country: Croatia
- County: Istria
- Municipality: Buje

Area
  - Total: 1.7 sq mi (4.5 km^{2})

Population (2021)
  - Total: 247
  - Density: 140/sq mi (55/km^{2})
- Time zone: UTC+1 (CET)
  - Summer (DST): UTC+2 (CEST)
- Postal code: 52460 Buje
- Area code: 052

Plovanija (Italian: Plovania) is a village in Croatia, near the border with Slovenia. It is connected by the D200 highway.

== Demographics ==
According to the 2021 census, its population was 247.
