= Kostanjica, Kotor =

Kostanjica Костањица
- Village
- Location within Montenegro
- Coordinates: 42.485182°N 18.669852°E
- Country: Montenegro
- Region: Coastal
- Municipality: Kotor

Population (2011)
  - Total: 127
- Time zone: UTC+1 (CET)
  - Summer (DST): UTC+2 (CEST)

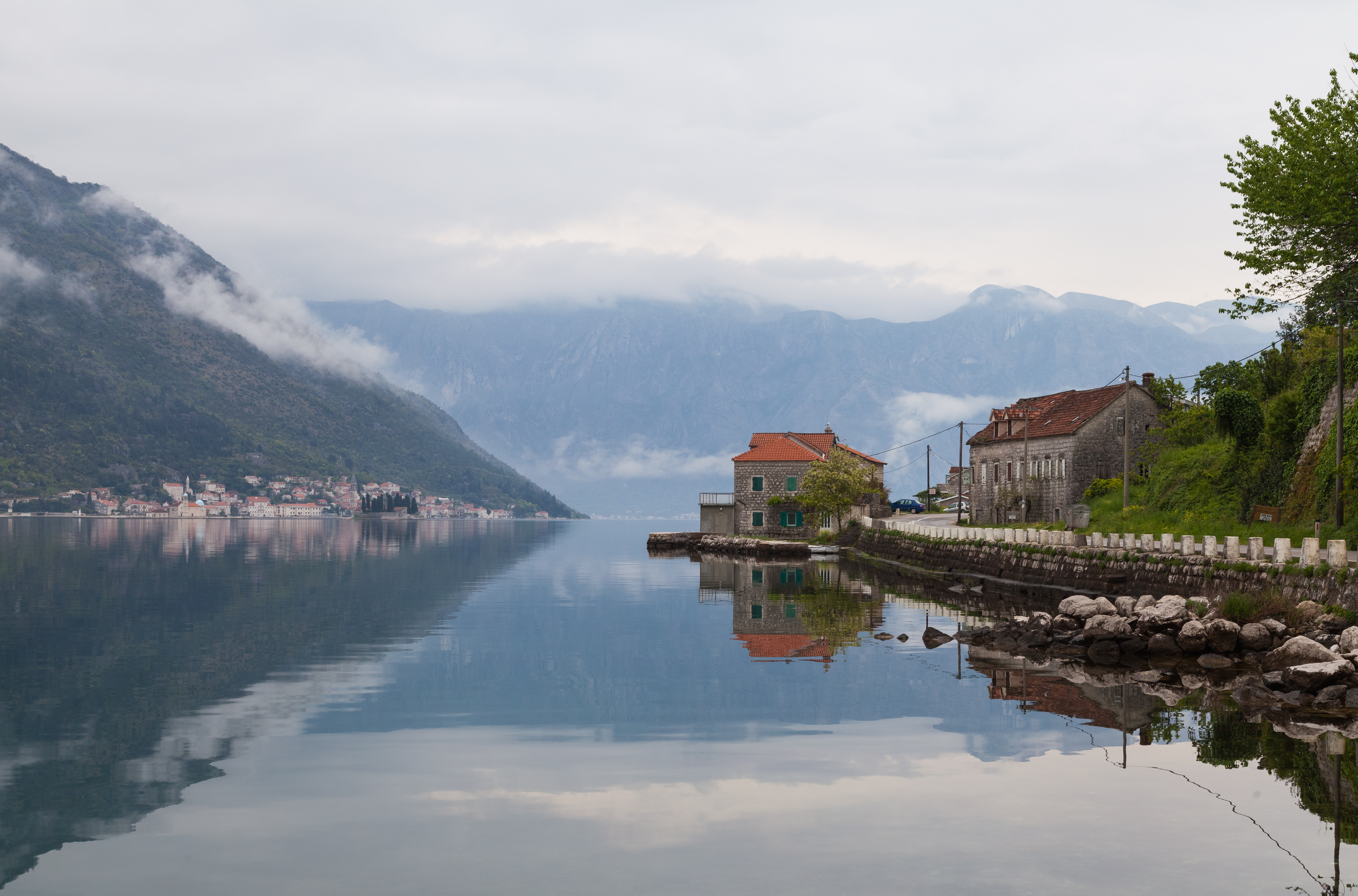
A view of the village from the Bay of Kotor

Kostanjica (Montenegrin: Костањица) is a village in the municipality of Kotor, Montenegro.

== Demographics ==
According to the 2011 census, its population was 127.

Ethnicity in 2011
Ethnicity	Number	Percentage
Montenegrins	61	48.0%
Serbs	42	33.1%
Croats	8	6.3%
other/undeclared	16	12.6%
Total	127	100%
