= Brič, Croatia =

Settlement in Istria County, Croatia

Brič
- Settlement
- Interactive map of Brič
- Location of Brič in Croatia
- Coordinates: 45°27′25″N 13°45′36″E
- Country: Croatia
- County: Istria County
- City: Buje

Area
  - Total: 2.2 km^{2} (0.85 sq mi)

Population (2021)
  - Total: 8
  - Density: 3.6/km^{2} (9.4/sq mi)
- Time zone: UTC+1 (CET)
  - Summer (DST): UTC+2 (CEST)
- Postal code: 52460 Buje
- Area code: +385 (0)52

Brič is a settlement in the City of Buje in Croatia. In 2021, its population was 8.

== Demographics ==
Brič: Population trends 1857–2021
v

population	142	150	134	126	129	113			117	78	62	33	23	18	16	13	8
	1857	1869	1880	1890	1900	1910	1921	1931	1948	1953	1961	1971	1981	1991	2001	2011	2021

Sources: Croatian Bureau of Statistics publications
