= Antonci, Grožnjan =

Antonci Antonzi
- Village
- Location within Croatia
- Coordinates: 45.3616044°N 13.7654832°E
- Country: Croatia
- County: Istria County
- Municipality: Grožnjan

Area
  - Total: 1.4 sq mi (3.5 km^{2})

Population (2021)
  - Total: 49
  - Density: 36/sq mi (14/km^{2})
- Time zone: UTC+1 (CET)
  - Summer (DST): UTC+2 (CEST)
- Postal code: 52428 Oprtalj
- Area code: 052

Antonci (Italian: Antonzi) is a village in the municipality of Grožnjan-Grisignana in Istria, Croatia.

== Demographics ==
According to the 2021 census, its population was 49.
