= Buje =

Buje Buie
- Town
- Town of Buje; Grad Buje - Città di Buie
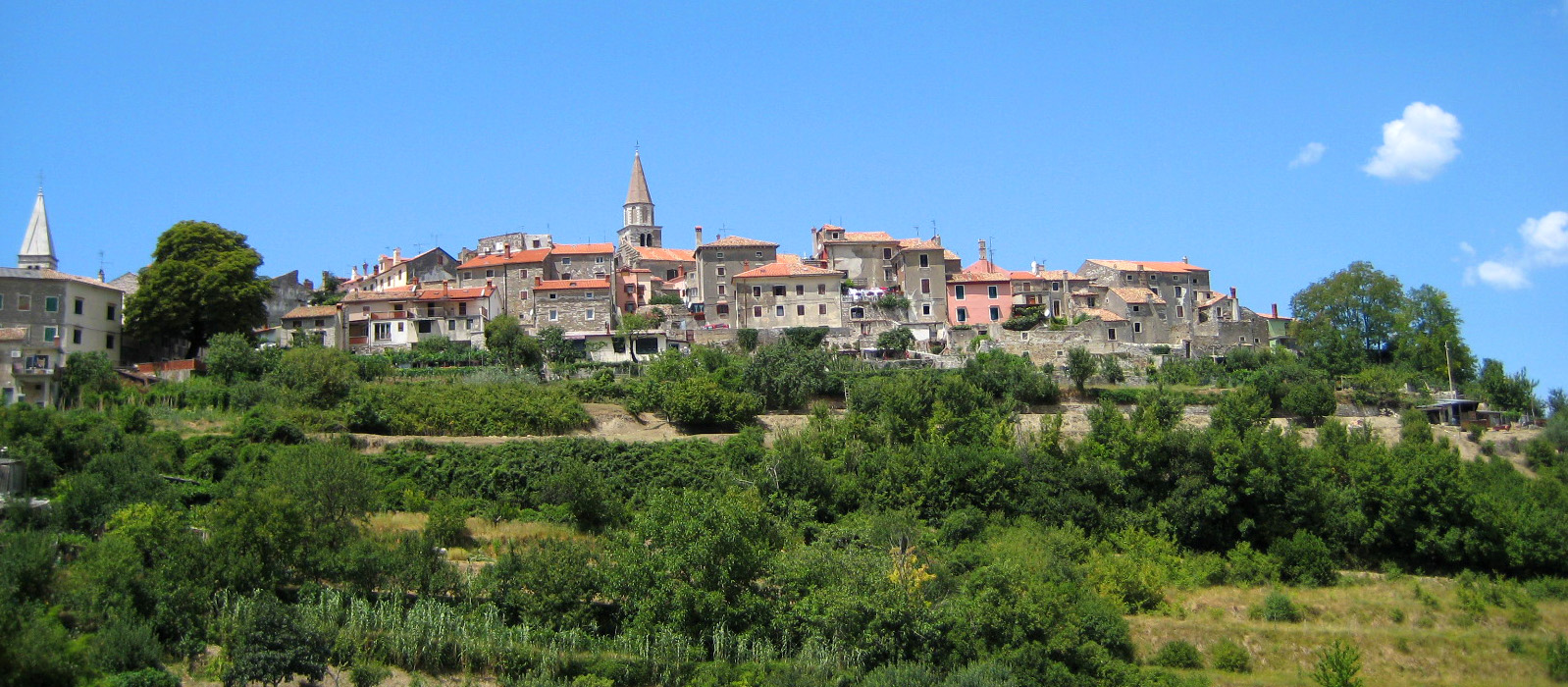

- Flag

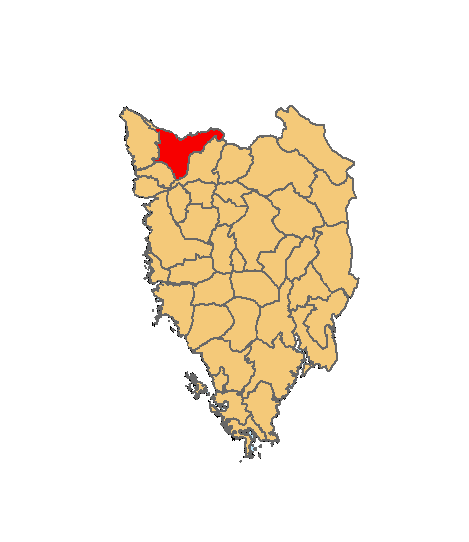
- Location of Buje municipality in Istria

- Location within Croatia
- Coordinates: 45°25′N 13°40′E
- Country: Croatia
- Region: Istria
- County: Istria County

Government
  - Mayor: Fabrizio Vižintin (IDS)

Area
  - Town: 38.3 sq mi (99.2 km^{2})
  - Urban: 6.4 sq mi (16.5 km^{2})

Population (2021)
  - Town: 4,441
  - Density: 116/sq mi (44.8/km^{2})
  - Urban: 2,087
  - Urban density: 328/sq mi (126/km^{2})
- Time zone: UTC+1 (CET)
  - Summer (DST): UTC+2 (CEST)
- Website: buje.hr

Buje (Italian: Buie; Venetian: Buje) is a town situated in Istria, Croatia's westernmost peninsula.

Buje was known as the "sentinel of Istria" for its hilltop site located 10 km (6.2 mi) inland from the Adriatic Sea.

== History ==
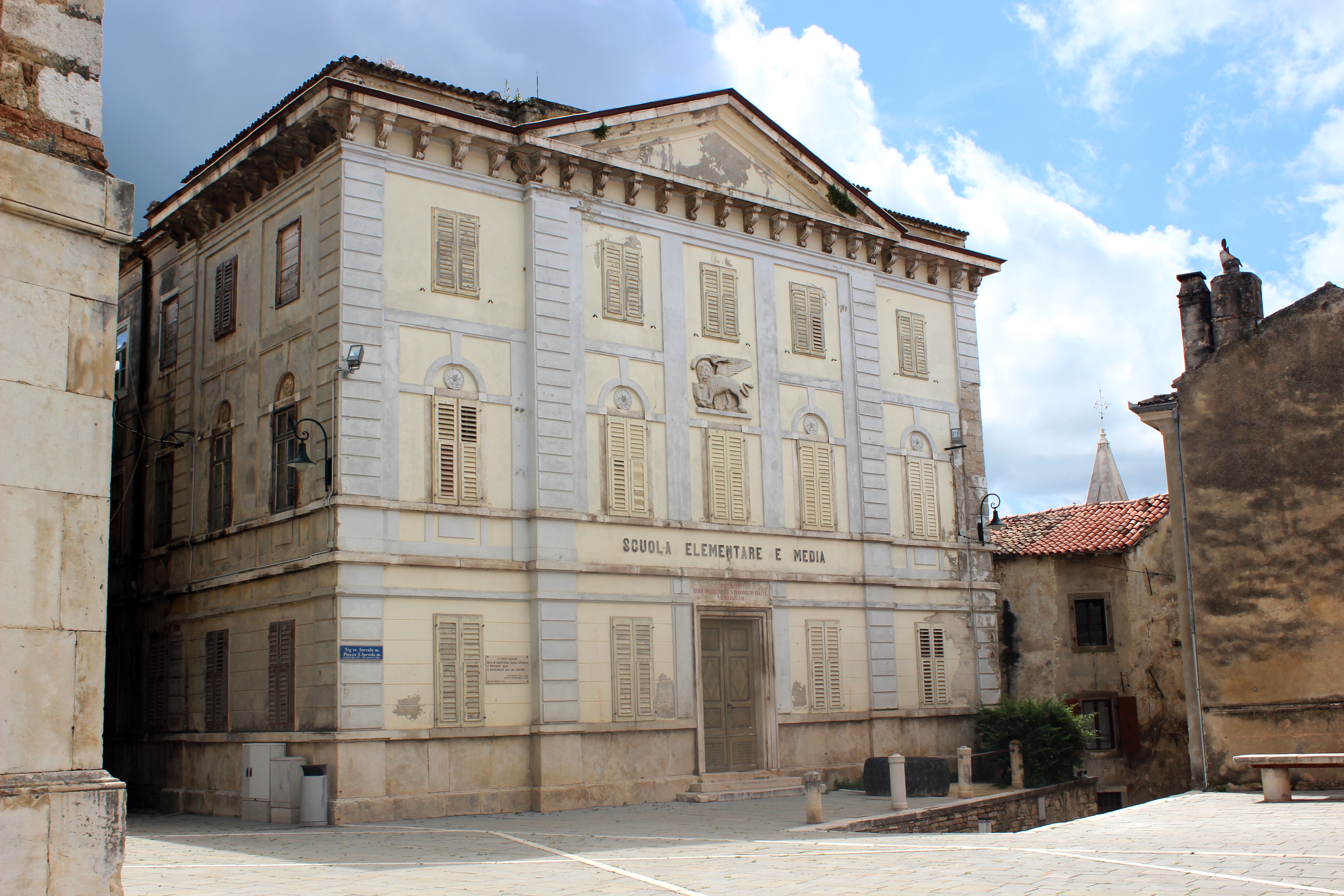
Neoclassical palace in Buje

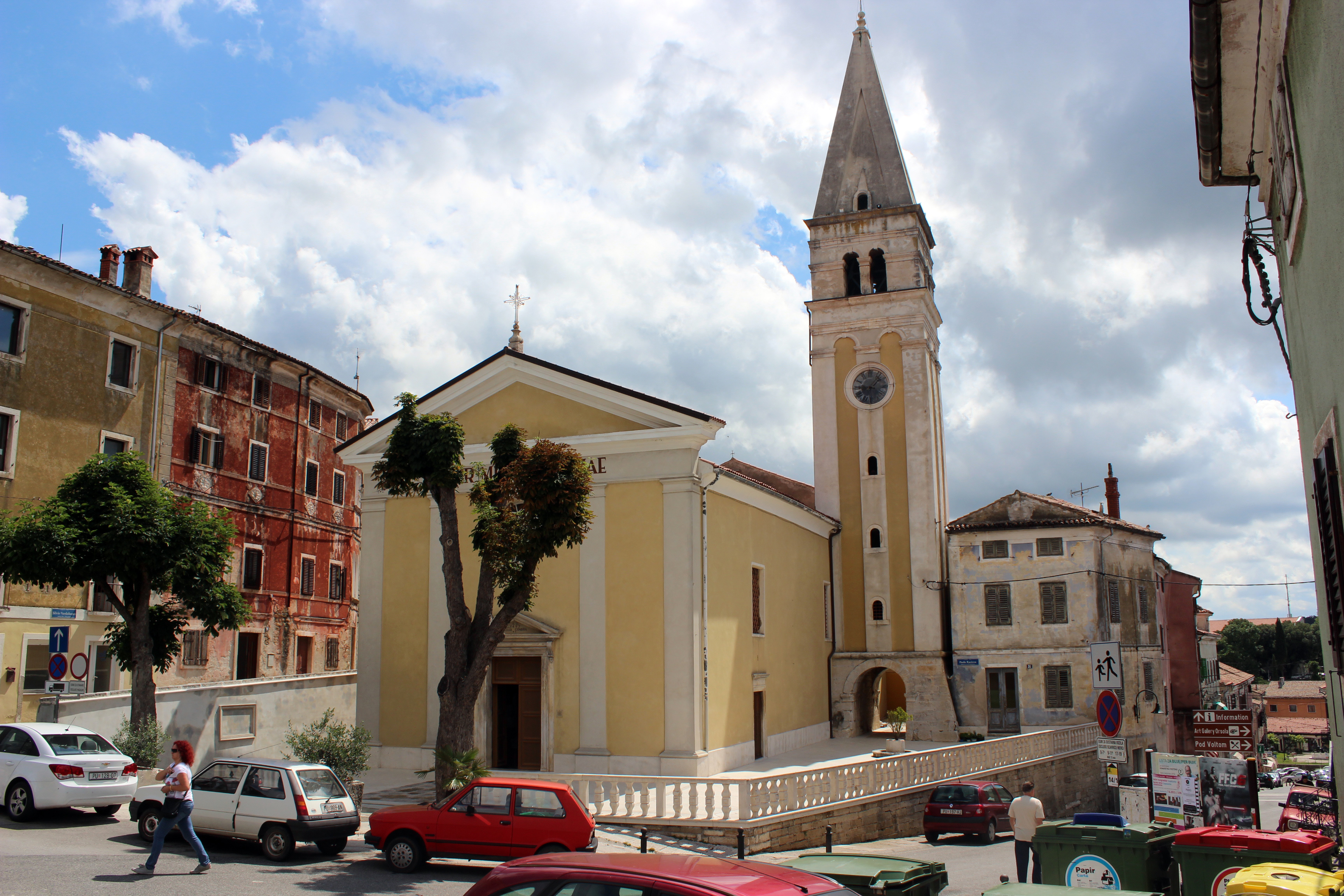
Church of Mother of Mercy in Buje

Buje has a rich history; traces of life in the region date back to prehistoric times. The town developed from a Roman and Venetian settlement into a medieval town. Buje was part of the Republic of Venice from 1358 until 1797, when the Treaty of Campo Formio handed it over to Austria. It was annexed by France after the Treaty of Schönbrunn in 1809 but restored to Austria at the Congress of Vienna in 1815. Buje passed to Italy at the end of World War I in 1918, where it remained until 1945. In 1947, it became part of the Free Territory of Trieste Zone B, which was administered by Yugoslavia. In October 1954, Zone B together with Buje was united with the Socialist Republic of Croatia, and remains part of independent Croatia today.

A Baroque style Church of Our Lady of Mercy from the 16th century, built on the foundations of an ancient Roman temple, dominates the central square. The old city was protected with stone fortifications, part of which have been preserved to modern times. With its narrow streets and a central square, the old town is a fine example of Medieval architecture with strong Venetian Renaissance architecture influences, as in the rest of the region.

After World War II Buje developed into an industrial, cultural, and economic center of this region of northwestern Croatia.

== Geography ==
The town is located in northwest Istria, 13 km from Umag. The town has an area of 103.28 km^{2}.

Buje has become a modern regional center, and outside of the old town center a modern city has sprung. Despite its development, the city has retained some features from its historical periods.

Being situated on a hill, the old town section offers views of the surrounding scenery, dominated by Mediterranean flora, vineyards, and olive groves.

Buje offers a blend of Mediterranean climate, regional cuisine, and a quiet setting away from the more touristic Istrian coastal resorts.

== Municipality ==
The Town of Buje consists of 21 settlements.

- Baredine
- Bibali
- Brdo / Collato
- Brič / Briz
- Buje / Buie
- Buroli
- Gamboci / Gambozzi
- Kaldanija / Caldania
- Kanegra / Canegra
- Kaštel / Castelvenere
- Krasica / Crassiza
- Kršete / Carsette
- Kućibreg / Cucciani
- Lozari / Losari
- Marušići / Marussici
- Merišće / Merischie
- Momjan / Momiano
- Oskoruš / Oscurus
- Plovanija / Plovania
- Sveta Marija na Krasu / Madonna del Carso
- Triban / Tribano

== Demographics ==
According to the 2021 census, its population was 4,441 with 2,087 living in the town proper.

The population of the whole administrative area of the Town of Buje in 2011 was 5,182, with 2,671 in the titular settlement itself.

Historical population of Buje
| Year | Pop. | ±% |
|---|---|---|
| 1880 | 6,980 | — |
| 1890 | 7,578 | +8.6% |
| 1900 | 8,311 | +9.7% |
| 1910 | 8,682 | +4.5% |
| 1921 | 8,989 | +3.5% |
| 1931 | 8,601 | −4.3% |
| 1948 | 8,013 | −6.8% |
| 1953 | 5,763 | −28.1% |
| 1961 | 5,344 | −7.3% |
| 1971 | 4,376 | −18.1% |
| 1981 | 4,957 | +13.3% |
| 1991 | 5,421 | +9.4% |
| 2001 | 5,340 | −1.5% |
| 2011 | 5,182 | −3.0% |
Source: Naselja i stanovništvo Republike Hrvatske 1857–2001, DZS, Zagreb, 2005

Grad Buje: Population trends 1857–2021
v

| population | 5811 | 6254 | 6980 | 7578 | 8311 | 8682 | 8989 | 8601 | 8013 | 5763 | 5344 | 4376 | 4957 | 5421 | 5340 | 5182 | 4441 |
| | 1857 | 1869 | 1880 | 1890 | 1900 | 1910 | 1921 | 1931 | 1948 | 1953 | 1961 | 1971 | 1981 | 1991 | 2001 | 2011 | 2021 |

Sources: Croatian Bureau of Statistics publications

=== Languages ===
According to the 1921 census, there were 7,341 residents who used Italian as their habitual language and a few dozen others, as opposed to 1910 when around 6520 people used Italian, and 580 Croatian and Slovene.

According to the 2011 census, 58.39% of the town's population had the Croatian language as their mother tongue, and 33.25% had the Italian language.

Buje has a high number of Italians, and an Italian language school, the "Leonardo da Vinci". It was 50% Italian in 1991, when the town's limits included Grožnjan/Grisignana.

Italian is an official language along with Croatian: although the Government of the Republic of Croatia does not guarantee official Croatian-Italian bilingualism, the statute of Buje/Buie itself guarantees it. Preserving traditional Italian place names and assigning street names to Italian historical figures is legally mandated and carried out.
