= Romanians =

Români
- Ethnic distribution of Romanians around the world

Total population
- c. 24.2 million (including foreign citizens of Romanian background , Romanian citizens of all ethnic groups living abroad and without counting around 3 million Moldovans)

Regions with significant populations
- Romania 17 million (2022 Romanian census); Moldova 192,800 (2014 Moldovan census; additional 2,068,058 Moldovans)
- Other countries
Europe
Italy	1,206,938 migrants from Romania, of all ethnic groups
Germany	909,795-1,100,000 (2023) migrants from Romania of all ethnic groups, including a wide range of Romanian Germans as well
Spain	630,795 Romanian citizens (2023)-1,079,726 including naturalized and second and third generation Romanians (2022)
United Kingdom	329,000-557,000 Romanian-born residents (2022)
France	200,000–500,000 (2024) Romanian citizens of all ethnic groups
Austria	153,363 Romanian citizens of all ethnic groups
Ukraine	150,989 (additional 258,619 Moldovans)
Belgium	105,358 migrants from Romania, of all ethnic groups
Greece	46,523 Romanian citizens of all ethnic groups
Denmark	46,486 Romanian-born and born to Romanian parents
Netherlands	39,654 migrants from Romania, of all ethnic groups
Portugal	39,000 Romanian citizens of all ethnic groups
Hungary	36,506
Sweden	32,294 born in Romania, of all ethnic groups
Ireland	29,186 Romanian citizens of all ethnic groups
Cyprus	24,376 Romanian citizens of all ethnic groups
Serbia	23,044 (additional 21,013 Timok Vlachs)
Switzerland	21,593 Romanian citizens of all ethnic groups
Norway	18,877 migrants of Romania, of all ethnic groups
Czech Republic	14,684 Romanian citizens of all ethnic groups
Turkey	14,411 Romanian citizens of all ethnic groups
Luxembourg	5,209 Romanian citizens of all ethnic groups
Poland	c. 5,000
Slovakia	4,941 Romanian citizens of all ethnic groups
Finland	4,902 Romanian citizens of all ethnic groups
Russia	3,201
Malta	2,000
Iceland	1,463 Romanian citizens of all ethnic groups
Bulgaria	891
Bosnia and Herzegovina	100
North America
United States	518,653–1,400,000 (incl. mixed origin)
Canada	204,625–400,000 (incl. mixed origin)
Mexico	569
South America
Brazil	40,000 migrants from Romania and Romanian citizens, of all ethnic groups
Venezuela	10,000 migrants from Romania, of all ethnic groups
Argentina	10,000 of Romanian origin, including Romanian Jews and Romanian Romani
Colombia	350
Uruguay	200
Peru	174
Oceania
Australia	20,998 first and second generation migrants from Romania, of all ethnic groups
New Zealand	3,100
Asia
Israel	100,823 (mostly Romanian Jews)
Japan	10,000
United Arab Emirates	6,444
Jordan	5,000
Qatar	3,000
Kazakhstan	421
Vietnam	100
Africa
South Africa	2,828
Egypt	420

Languages
- Romanian, Romanian Sign Language

Religion
- Predominantly Orthodox Christianity (Romanian Orthodox Church), also Roman Catholic, Greek Catholic, and Protestant

Related ethnic groups
- Other Eastern Romance-speaking peoples (most notably Moldovans, Aromanians, Megleno-Romanians, and Istro-Romanians)

Romanians (Romanian: români, pronounced [roˈmɨnʲ]; dated exonym Vlachs) are a Romance-speaking ethnic group and nation native to Central, Eastern, and Southeastern Europe. Romanians share a common culture, history, ancestry and language and live primarily in Romania and Moldova. There is a debate regarding the ethnic categorisation of the Moldovans, concerning whether they constitute a subgroup of the Romanians or a completely different ethnic group. The origin of the Romanians is also fiercely debated, one theory suggests that the ancestors of Romanians are the Daco-Romans, while the other theory suggests that Romanians are mainly the Thraco-Romans and Illyro-Romans from the inner Balkan Peninsula, who later migrated north of the Danube.

In one interpretation of the 1989 census results in Moldova, the majority of Moldovans were counted as ethnic Romanians as well. Romanians also form an ethnic minority in several nearby countries situated in Central, Southeastern, and Eastern Europe, most notably in Hungary, Serbia (including Timok), and Ukraine.

Estimates of the number of Romanian people worldwide vary from 24 to 30 million, in part depending on whether the definition of the term "Romanian" includes natives of both Romania and Moldova, their respective diasporas, and native speakers of both Romanian and other Eastern Romance languages. Other speakers of the latter languages are the Aromanians, the Megleno-Romanians, and the Istro-Romanians (native to Istria), all of them unevenly distributed throughout the Balkan Peninsula, which may be considered either Romanian subgroups or separated but related ethnicities.

== History ==
=== Antiquity ===
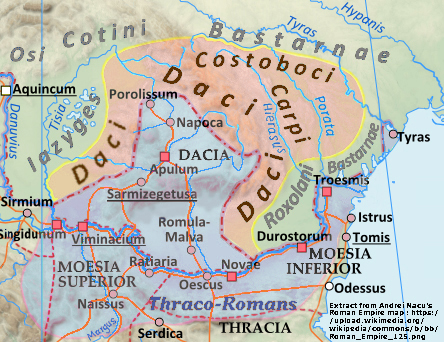
Map showing the area where Dacian was spoken. The blue area shows the Dacian lands conquered by the Roman Empire. The orange area was inhabited by Free Dacian tribes and others.

The territories of modern-day Romania and Moldova were inhabited by the ancient Getae and Dacian tribes. King Burebista who reigned from 82/61 BC to 45/44 BC, was the first king who successfully unified the tribes of the Dacian kingdom, which comprised the area located between the Danube, Tisza, and Dniester rivers. King Decebalus who reigned from 87 to 106 AD was the last king of the Dacian kingdom before it was conquered by the Roman Empire in 106 after two wars between Decebalus's army and Trajan's army. Prior to the two wars, Decebalus defeated a Roman invasion during the reign of Domitian between 86 and 88 AD.

The Roman administration retreated from Dacia between 271 and 275 AD, during the reign of emperor Aurelian under the pressure from the Goths and the Dacian Carpi tribe. The later Roman province Dacia Aureliana, was organized inside former Moesia Superior. It was reorganized as Dacia Ripensis (as a military province, devastated by an Avars invasion in 586) and Dacia Mediterranea (as a civil province, devastated by an Avar invasion in 602).

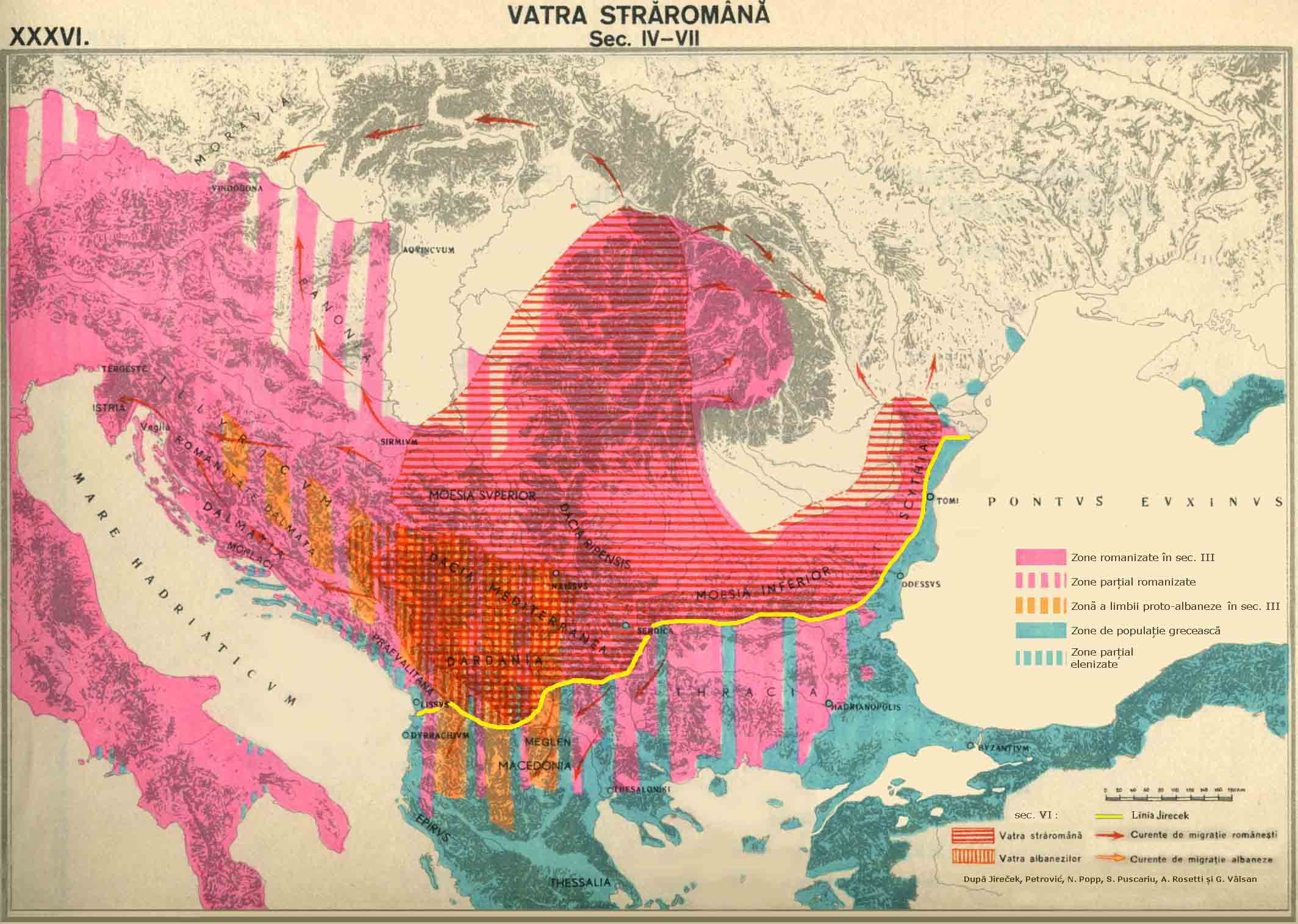
Map showing the area where the Latin language was spoken in pink during the Roman Empire between the 4th and 7th century (including the territory of present-day Romania)

The Diocese of Dacia (circa 337–602) was a diocese of the later Roman Empire, in the area of modern-day Balkans. The Diocese of Dacia was composed of five provinces, the northernmost provinces were Dacia Ripensis (the Danubian portion of Dacia Aureliana; one of the cities from Dacia Ripensis in modern-day Romania is Sucidava) and Moesia Prima (today in Serbia, near its border with Romania). The territory of the diocese was devastated by the Huns in the middle of the 5th century and finally overrun by the Avars and Slavs in late 6th and early 7th century.

Scythia Minor (c. 290 – c. 680) was a Roman province corresponding to the lands between the Danube and the Black Sea, today's Dobruja divided between Romania and Bulgaria. The capital of the province was Tomis (today Constanța). According to the Laterculus Veronensis of c. 314 and the Notitia Dignitatum of c. 400, Scythia belonged to the Diocese of Thrace. The indigenous population of Scythia Minor was Dacian and their material culture is apparent archaeologically into the sixth century. Roman fortifications mostly date to the Tetrarchy or the Constantinian dynasty. The province ceased to exist around 679–681, when the region was overrun by the Bulgars, which the Emperor Constantine IV was forced to recognize in 681.

=== Early Middle Ages to Late Middle Ages ===
During the Middle Ages Romanians were mostly known as Vlachs, a blanket term ultimately of Germanic origin, from the word Walha, used by ancient Germanic peoples to refer to Romance-speaking and Celtic neighbours. Besides the separation of some groups (Aromanians, Megleno-Romanians, and Istro-Romanians) during the Age of Migration, many Vlachs could be found all over the Balkans, in Transylvania, across Carpathian Mountains as far north as Poland and as far west as the regions of Moravia (part of the modern Czech Republic), some went as far east as Volhynia of western Ukraine, and the present-day Croatia where the Morlachs gradually disappeared, while the Catholic and Orthodox Vlachs took Croat and Serb national identity.

The first written record about a Romance language spoken in the Middle Ages in the Balkans, near the Haemus Mons is from 587 AD. A Vlach muleteer accompanying the Byzantine army noticed that the load was falling from one of the animals and shouted to a companion Torna, torna, fratre! (meaning "Return, return, brother!"). Theophanes the Confessor recorded it as part of a 6th-century military expedition by Comentiolus and Priscus against the Avars. Historian Gheorghe I. Brătianu considers that these words "represent an expression from the Romanian language, as it was formed at that time in the Balkan and Danube regions"; "they probably belong to one and the most significant of the substrates on which our (Romanian) language was built".

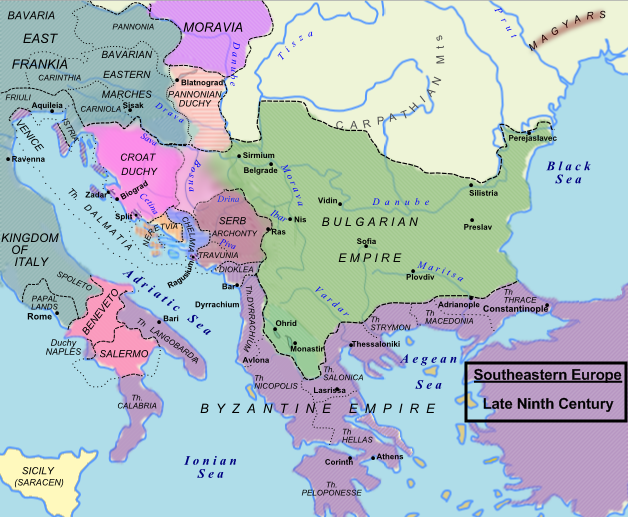
First Bulgarian Empire (681–1018) around 850

After the Avar Khaganate collapsed in the 790s, the First Bulgarian Empire became the dominant power of the region, occupying lands as far as the river Tisa. The First Bulgarian Empire had a mixed population consisting of the Bulgar conquerors, Slavs and Vlachs (Romanians) but the Slavicisation of the Bulgar elite had already begun in the 9th century. Following the conquest of Southern and Central Transylvania around 830, people from the Bulgar Empire mined salt from mines in Turda, Ocna Mureș, Sărățeni and Ocnița. They traded and transported salt throughout the Bulgar Empire.

A series of Arab historians from the 10th century are some of the first to mention Vlachs in Eastern/South Eastern Europe: Mutahhar al-Maqdisi (c.945-991) writes: "They say that in the Turkic neighborhood there are the Khazars, Russians, Slavs, Waladj (Vlachs), Alans, Greeks and many other peoples". Ibn al-Nadīm (early 932–998) published in 998 the work Kitāb al-Fihrist mentioning "Turks, Bulgars and Vlahs" (using Blagha for Vlachs).

The Byzantine chronicler Niketas Choniates writes that in 1164, Andronikos I Komnenos, the emperor Manuel I Komnenos's cousin, tried without success, to usurp the throne. Failing in his attempt, the Byzantine prince sought refuge in Halych but Andronikos I Komnenos was "captured by the Vlachs, to whom the rumor of his escape had reached, he was taken back to the emperor".

The Byzantine chronicler John Kinnamos, presenting the campaign of Manuel I Komnenos against Hungary in 1166, reports that General Leon Vatatzes had under his command "a great multitude of Vlachs, who are said to be ancient colonies of those in Italy", an army that attacked the Hungarian possessions "about the lands near the Pontus called the Euxine", respectively the southeastern regions of Transylvania, "destroyed everything without sparing and trampled everything it encountered in its passage".

By the 9th and 10th centuries, the nomadic Pechenegs conquered much of the steppes of Southeast Europe and the Crimean Peninsula.The Pecheneg wars against the Kievan Rus' caused some of the Slavs and Vlachs from North of the Danube to gradually migrate north of the Dniestr in the 10th and 11th centuries.

The Second Bulgarian Empire founded by the Asen dynasty consisting of Bulgarians and Vlachs was founded in 1185 and lasted until 1396. Early rulers from the Asen dynasty (particularly Kaloyan) referred to themselves as "Emperors of Bulgarians and Vlachs". Later rulers, especially Ivan Asen II, styled themselves "Tsars (Emperors) of Bulgarians and Romans". An alternative name used in connection with the pre-mid Second Bulgarian Empire 13th century period is the Empire of Vlachs and Bulgarians; variant names include the "Vlach–Bulgarian Empire", the "Bulgarian–Wallachian Empire".

Royal charters wrote of the "Vlachs' land" in southern Transylvania in the early 13th century, indicating the existence of autonomous Romanian communities. Papal correspondence mentions the activities of Orthodox prelates among the Romanians in Muntenia in the 1230s. Béla IV of Hungary's land grant to the Knights Hospitallers in Oltenia and Muntenia shows that the local Vlach rulers were subject to the king's authority in 1247.

The late 13th-century Hungarian chronicler Simon of Kéza states that the Vlachs were "shepherds and husbandmen" who "remained in Pannonia". An unknown author's Description of Eastern Europe from 1308 likewise states that the Vlachs "were once the shepherds of the Romans" who "had over them ten powerful kings in the entire Messia and Pannonia".

Testimonies from the 13th and the 14th centuries show that, although in Europe and beyond, they were called Vlachs or Wallachians (oláh in Hungarian, Vláchoi (Βλάχοι) in Greek, Volóxi (Воло́хи) in Russian, Walachen in German, Valacchi in Italian, Valaques in French, Valacos in Spanish), the Vlachs used the endonym rumân or român, from the Latin romānus, meaning 'Roman'.

In the 14th century the Danubian Principalities of Moldavia and Wallachia emerged to fight the Ottoman Empire. During the late Middle Ages, prominent medieval Romanian monarchs such as Bogdan of Moldavia, Stephen the Great, Mircea the Elder, Michael the Brave, or Vlad the Impaler took part actively in the history of Central Europe by waging tumultuous wars and leading noteworthy crusades against the then continuously expanding Ottoman Empire, at times allied with either the Kingdom of Poland or the Kingdom of Hungary in these causes.

=== Early Modern Age to Late Modern Age ===
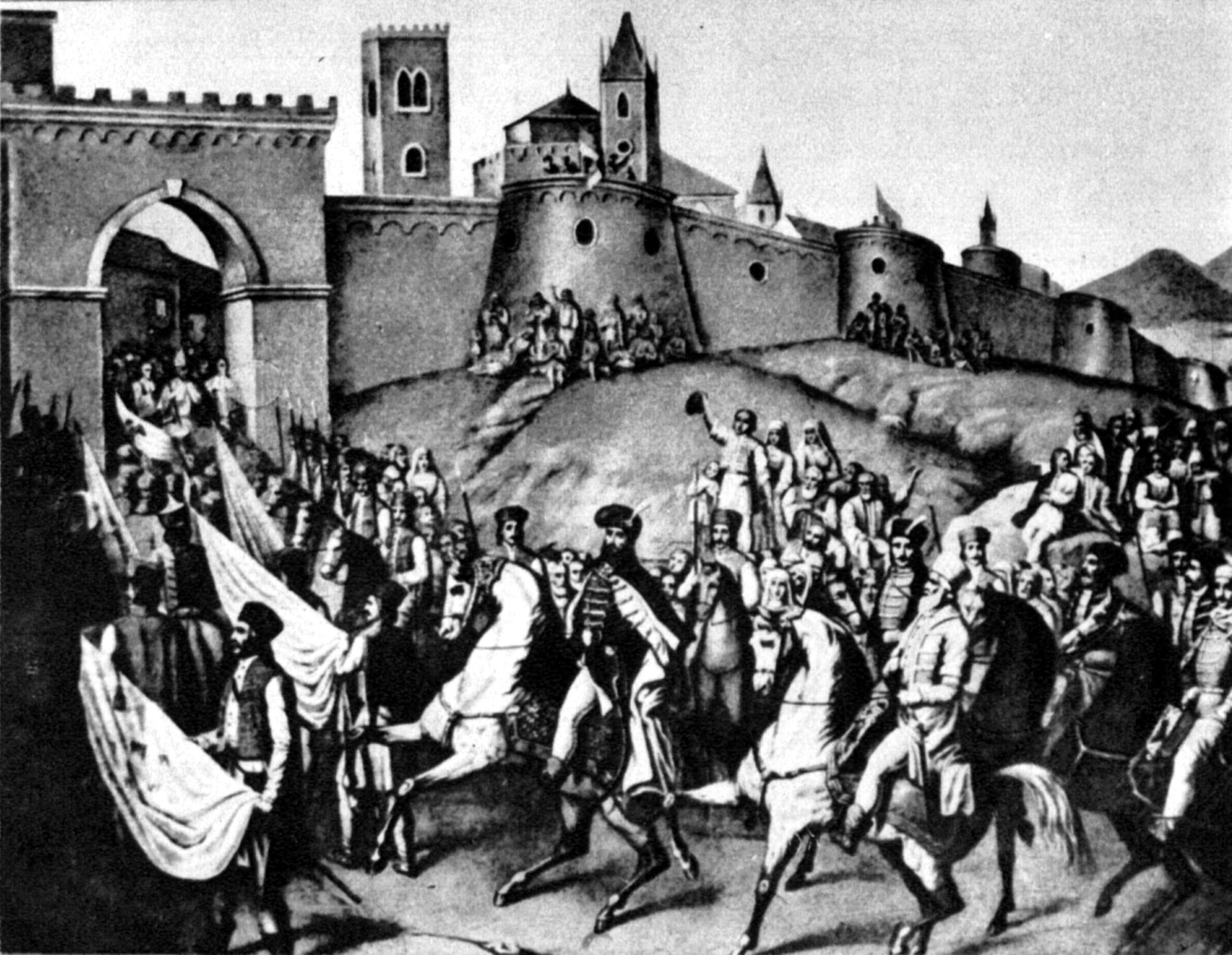
Michael the Brave entering Alba Iulia

Eventually the entire Balkan peninsula was annexed by the Ottoman Empire. However, Moldavia and Wallachia (extending to Dobruja and Bulgaria) were not entirely subdued by the Ottomans as both principalities became autonomous (which was not the case of other Ottoman territorial possessions in Europe). Transylvania, a third region inhabited by an important majority of Romanian speakers, was a vassal state of the Ottomans until 1687, when the principality became part of the Habsburg possessions. The three principalities were united for several months in 1600 under the authority of Wallachian Prince Michael the Brave.

Up until 1541, Transylvania was part of the Kingdom of Hungary, later (due to the conquest of Hungary by the Ottoman Empire) was a self-governed Principality governed by the Hungarian nobility. In 1699 it became a part of the Habsburg lands. By the end of the 18th century, the Austrian Empire was awarded by the Ottomans with the region of Bukovina and, in 1812, the Russians occupied the eastern half of Moldavia, known as Bessarabia through the Treaty of Bucharest of 1812.

Animated history of Romania's borders (mid 19th century–present)

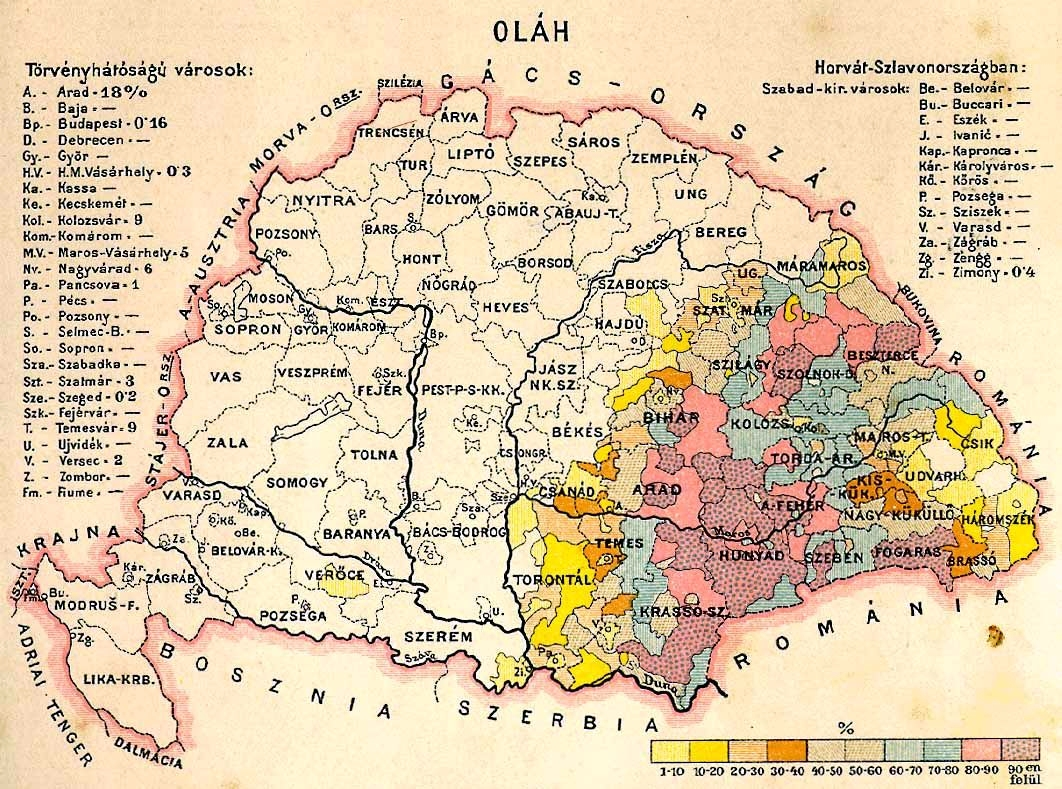
Romanians in the Kingdom of Hungary, according to the 1890 census

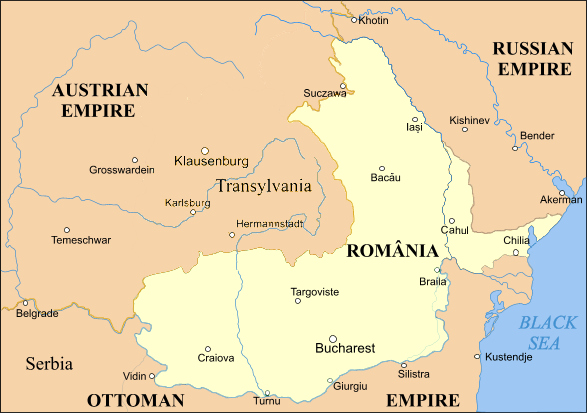
Map depicting the United Principalities of Wallachia and Moldavia between 1859 and 1878

In the context of the 1848 Romanticist and liberal revolutions across Europe, the events that took place in the Grand Principality of Transylvania were the first of their kind to unfold in the Romanian-speaking territories. On the one hand, the Transylvanian Saxons and the Transylvanian Romanians (with consistent support on behalf of the Austrian Empire) successfully managed to oppose the goals of the Hungarian Revolution of 1848, with the two noteworthy historical figures leading the common Romanian-Saxon side at the time being Avram Iancu and Stephan Ludwig Roth.

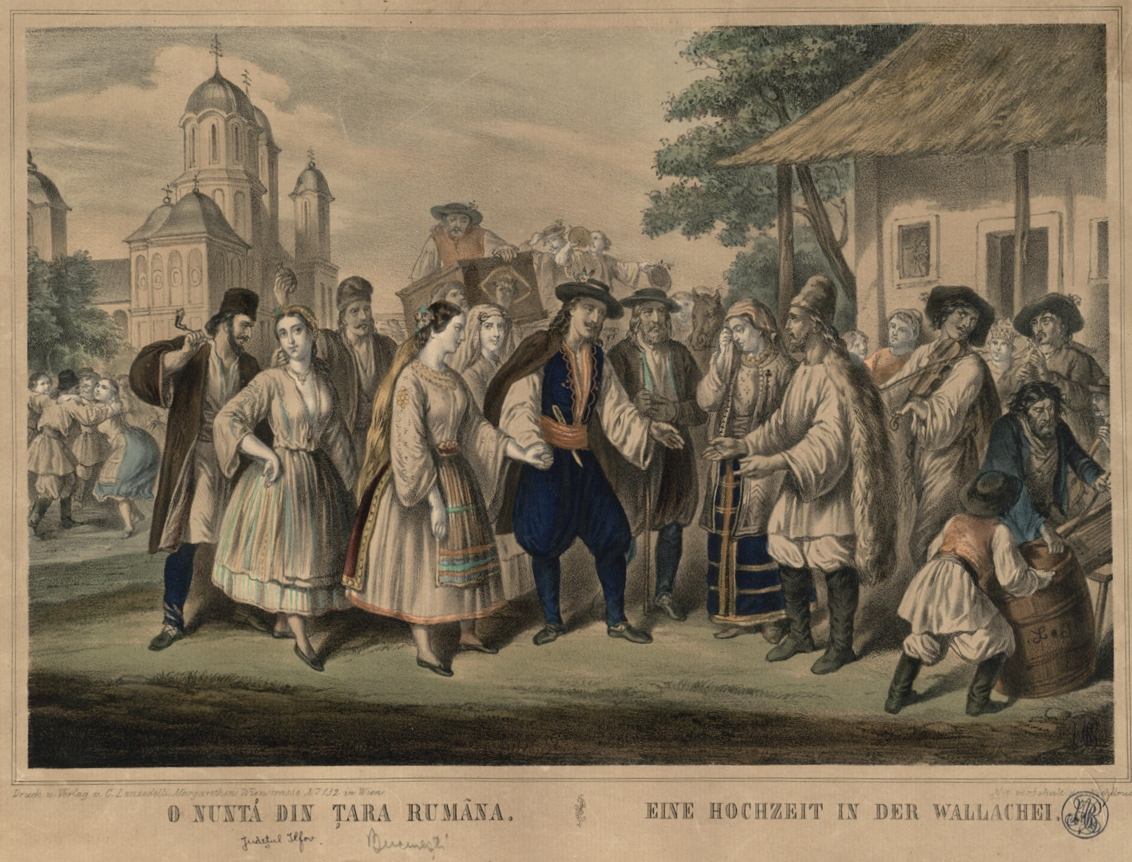
Romanian peasants in the 1840s

On the other hand, the Wallachian revolutions of 1821 and 1848 as well as the Moldavian Revolution of 1848, which aimed for independence from Ottoman and Russian foreign rulership, represented important impacts in the process of spreading the liberal ideology in the eastern and southern Romanian lands, in spite of the fact that all three eventually failed. Nonetheless, in 1859, Moldavia and Wallachia elected the same ruler, namely Alexander John Cuza (who reigned as Domnitor) and were thus unified de facto, resulting in the United Romanian Principalities for the period between 1859 and 1881.

During the 1870s, the United Romanian Principalities (then led by Hohenzollern-Sigmaringen Domnitor Carol I) fought a War of Independence against the Ottomans, with Romania's independence being formally recognised in 1878 at the Treaty of Berlin.

Although the relatively newly founded Kingdom of Romania initially allied with Austria-Hungary, Romania refused to enter World War I on the side of the Central Powers, because it was obliged to wage war only if Austria-Hungary was attacked. In 1916, Romania joined the war on the side of the Triple Entente.

As a result, at the end of the war, Transylvania, Bessarabia, and Bukovina were awarded to Romania, through a series of international peace treaties, resulting in an enlarged and far more powerful kingdom under King Ferdinand I. As of 1920, the Romanian people was believed to number over 15 million solely in the region of the Romanian kingdom, a figure larger than the populations of Sweden, Denmark, and the Netherlands combined.

During the interwar period, two additional monarchs came to the Romanian throne, namely Carol II and Michael I. This short-lived period was marked, at times, by political instabilities and efforts of maintaining a constitutional monarchy in favour of other, totalitarian regimes such as an absolute monarchy or a military dictatorship.

=== Contemporary Era ===
During World War II, the Kingdom of Romania lost territory both to the east and west, as Northern Transylvania became part of the Kingdom of Hungary through the Second Vienna Award, while Bessarabia and northern Bukovina were taken by the Soviets and included in the Moldavian SSR, respectively Ukrainian SSR. The eastern territory losses were facilitated by the Molotov–Ribbentrop Nazi-Soviet non-aggression pact.

After the end of the war, the Romanian Kingdom managed to regain territories lost westward but was nonetheless not given Bessarabia and northern Bukovina back, the aforementioned regions being forcefully incorporated into the Soviet Union (USSR). Subsequently, the Soviet Union imposed a communist government and King Michael was forced to abdicate and leave for exile, subsequently settling in Switzerland, while Petru Groza remained the head of the government of the Socialist Republic of Romania (RSR). Nicolae Ceaușescu became the head of the Romanian Communist Party (PCR) in 1965 and his severe rule of the 1980s was ended by the Romanian Revolution of 1989.

The chaos of the 1989 revolution brought to power the dissident communist Ion Iliescu as president (largely supported by the FSN). Iliescu remained in power as head of state until 1996, when he was defeated by CDR-supported Emil Constantinescu in the 1996 general elections, the first in post-communist Romania that saw a peaceful transition of power. Following Constantinescu's single term as president from 1996 to 2000, Iliescu was re-elected in late 2000 for another term of four years. In 2004, Traian Băsescu, the PNL-PD candidate of the Justice and Truth Alliance (DA), was elected president. Five years later, Băsescu (solely supported by the PDL this time) was narrowly re-elected for a second term in the 2009 presidential elections.

In 2014, the PNL-PDL candidate (as part of the larger Christian Liberal Alliance or ACL for short; also endorsed by the Democratic Forum of Germans in Romania, FDGR/DFDR for short respectively) Klaus Iohannis won a surprise victory over former Prime Minister and PSD-supported contender Victor Ponta in the second round of the 2014 presidential elections. Thus, Iohannis became the first Romanian president stemming from an ethnic minority of the country (as he belongs to the Romanian-German community, being a Transylvanian Saxon). In 2019, the PNL-supported Iohannis was re-elected for a second term as president after a second round landslide victory in the 2019 Romanian presidential election (being also supported in that round by PMP and USR as well as by the FDGR/DFDR in both rounds).

In the meantime, Romania's major foreign policy achievements were the alignment with Western Europe and the United States by joining the North Atlantic Treaty Organization (NATO) in 2004, the European Union in 2007 and the Schengen Area in 2025. Current national objectives of Romania include adhering to the eurozone as well as the OECD (i.e. Organisation for Economic Co-operation and Development).

== Language ==
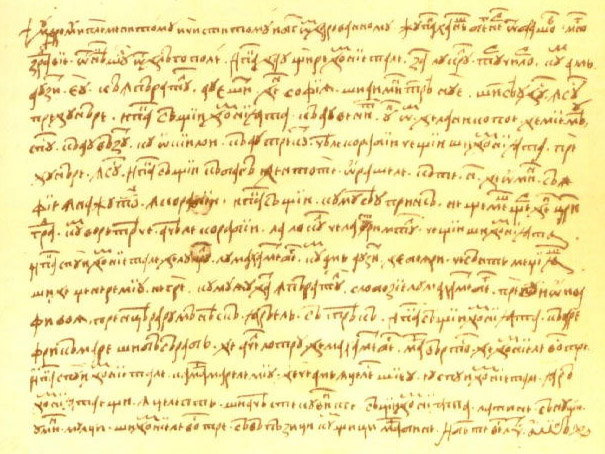
Neacșu's letter to Johannes Benkner (former Transylvanian Saxon mayor of Kronstadt/Brașov) is the oldest document written in Romanian that can be precisely dated.

During the Middle Ages, Romanian was isolated from the other Romance languages, and borrowed words from the nearby Slavic languages (see Slavic influence on Romanian). Later on, it borrowed a number of words from German, Hungarian, and Turkish. During the modern era, most neologisms were borrowed from French and Italian, though the language has increasingly begun to adopt English borrowings.

The origins of the Romanian language, a Romance language, can be traced back to the Roman colonisation of the region. The basic vocabulary is of Latin origin, although there are some substratum words that are assumed to be of Dacian origin. It is the most spoken Eastern Romance language and is closely related to Aromanian, Megleno-Romanian, and Istro-Romanian, all three part of the same sub-branch of Romance languages.

Romanian language, as part of the Eastern Romance sub-branch of Romance languages, alongside and related to Aromanian, Megleno-Romanian, and Istro-Romanian.

Since 2013, the Romanian Language Day is officially celebrated on 31 August in Romania. In Moldova, it is officially celebrated on the same day since 2023.

As of 2017, an Ethnologue estimation puts the (worldwide) number of Romanian speakers at approximately 24.15 million. The 24.15 million, however, represent only speakers of Romanian, not all of whom are necessarily ethnic Romanians. Also, this number does not include ethnic-Romanians who no longer speak the Romanian language.

== Names for Romanians ==
=== Etymology of the name Romanian (român) ===
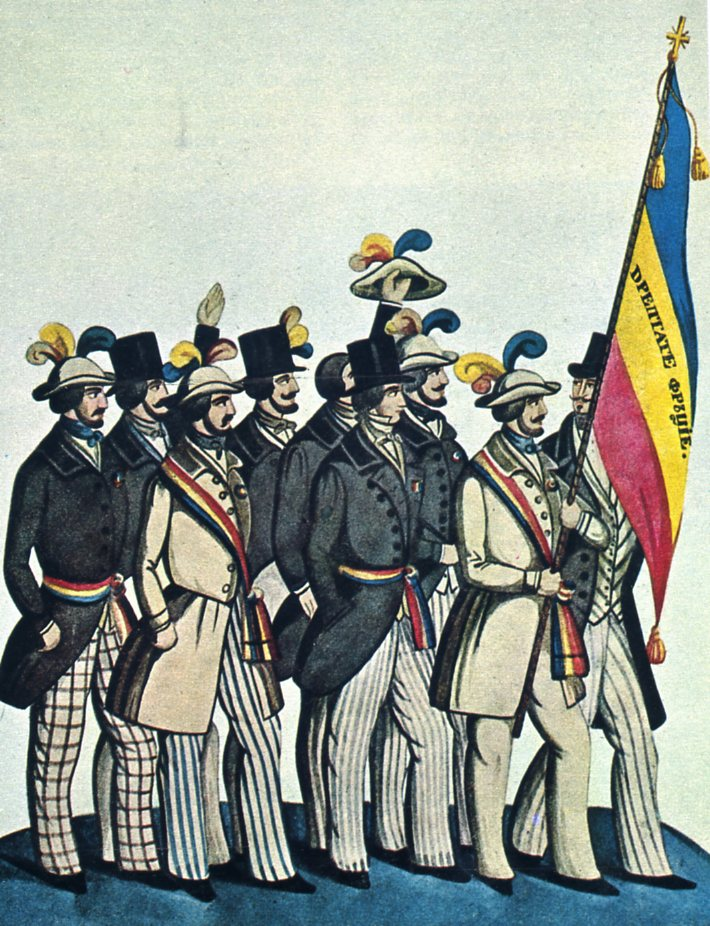
Romanian revolutionaries of 1848 waving the tricolor flag

The name Romanian is derived from Latin romanus, meaning "Roman". Under regular phonetical changes that are typical to the Romanian language, the name romanus over the centuries transformed into rumân [ruˈmɨn]. An older form of român was still in use in some regions. Socio-linguistic evolutions in the late 18th century led to a gradual preponderance of the român spelling form, which was then generalised during the National awakening of Romania of early 19th century. Several historical sources show the use of the term "Romanian" among the medieval or early modern Romanian population. One of the earliest examples comes from the Nibelungenlied, a German epic poem from before 1200 in which a "Duke Ramunc from the land of Vlachs (Wallachia)" is mentioned. "Vlach" was an exonym used almost exclusively for the Romanians during the Middle Ages. It has been argued by some Romanian researchers that "Ramunc" was not the name of the duke, but a name that highlighted his ethnicity. Other old documents, especially Byzantine or Hungarian ones, make a correlation between the old Romanians as Romans or their descendants. Several other documents, notably from Italian travelers into Wallachia, Moldavia and Transylvania, speak of the self-identification, language and culture of the Romanians, showing that they designated themselves as "Romans" or related to them in up to 30 works. One example is Tranquillo Andronico's 1534 writing that states that the Vlachs "now call themselves Romans". Another one is Francesco della Valle's 1532 manuscripts that state that the Romanians from Wallachia, Moldavia and Transylvania preserved the name "Roman" and cites the sentence "Sti Rominest?" (știi românește?, "do you speak Romanian?"). Authors that travelled to modern Romania who wrote about it in 1574, 1575 and 1666 also noted the use of the term "Romanian". From the Middle Ages, Romanians bore two names, the exonym (one given to them by foreigners) Wallachians or Vlachs, under its various forms (vlah, valah, valach, voloh, blac, olăh, vlas, ilac, ulah, etc.), and the endonym (the name they used for themselves) Romanians (Rumâni/Români). The first mentions by Romanians of the endonym are contemporary with the earliest writings in Romanian from the sixteenth century.

According to Tomasz Kamusella, at the time of the rise of Romanian nationalism during the early 19th century, the political leaders of Wallachia and Moldavia were aware that the name România was identical to Romania, a name that had been used for the former Byzantine Empire by its inhabitants. Kamusella continues by stating that they preferred this ethnonym in order to stress their presumed link with Ancient Rome and that it became more popular as a nationalistic form of referring to all Romanian-language speakers as a distinct and separate nation during the 1820s. Raymond Detrez asserts that român, derived from the Latin Romanus, acquired at a certain point the same meaning of the Greek Romaios; that of Orthodox Christian. Wolfgang Dahmen claims that the meaning of romanus (Roman) as "Christian", as opposed to "pagan", which used to mean "non-Roman", may have contributed to the preservation of this word as an ethonym of the Romanian people, under the meaning of "Christian".

==== Daco-Romanian ====
To distinguish Romanians from the other Romanic peoples of the Balkans (Aromanians, Megleno-Romanians, and Istro-Romanians), the term Daco-Romanian is sometimes used to refer to those who speak the standard Romanian language and live in the former territory of ancient Dacia (today comprising mostly Romania and Moldova) and its surroundings (such as Dobruja or the Timok Valley, the latter region part of the former Roman province of Dacia Ripensis).

=== Etymology of the term Vlach ===
The name of "Vlachs" is an exonym that was used by Slavs to refer to all Romanized natives of the Balkans. It holds its origin from ancient Germanic—being a cognate to "Welsh" and "Walloon"—and perhaps even further back in time, from the Roman name Volcae, which was originally a Celtic tribe. From the Slavs, it was passed on to other peoples, such as the Hungarians (Oláh) and Greeks (Vlachoi) (see the Etymology section of Vlachs). Wallachia, the Southern region of Romania, takes its name from the same source.

Nowadays, the term Vlach is more often used to refer to the Romanized populations of the Balkans who speak Daco-Romanian, Aromanian, Istro-Romanian, and Megleno-Romanian.

== Romanians outside Romania ==
Countries with a significant Romanian population and descendants from Romanians: Romania +1,000,000 +100,000 +10,000 +1,000

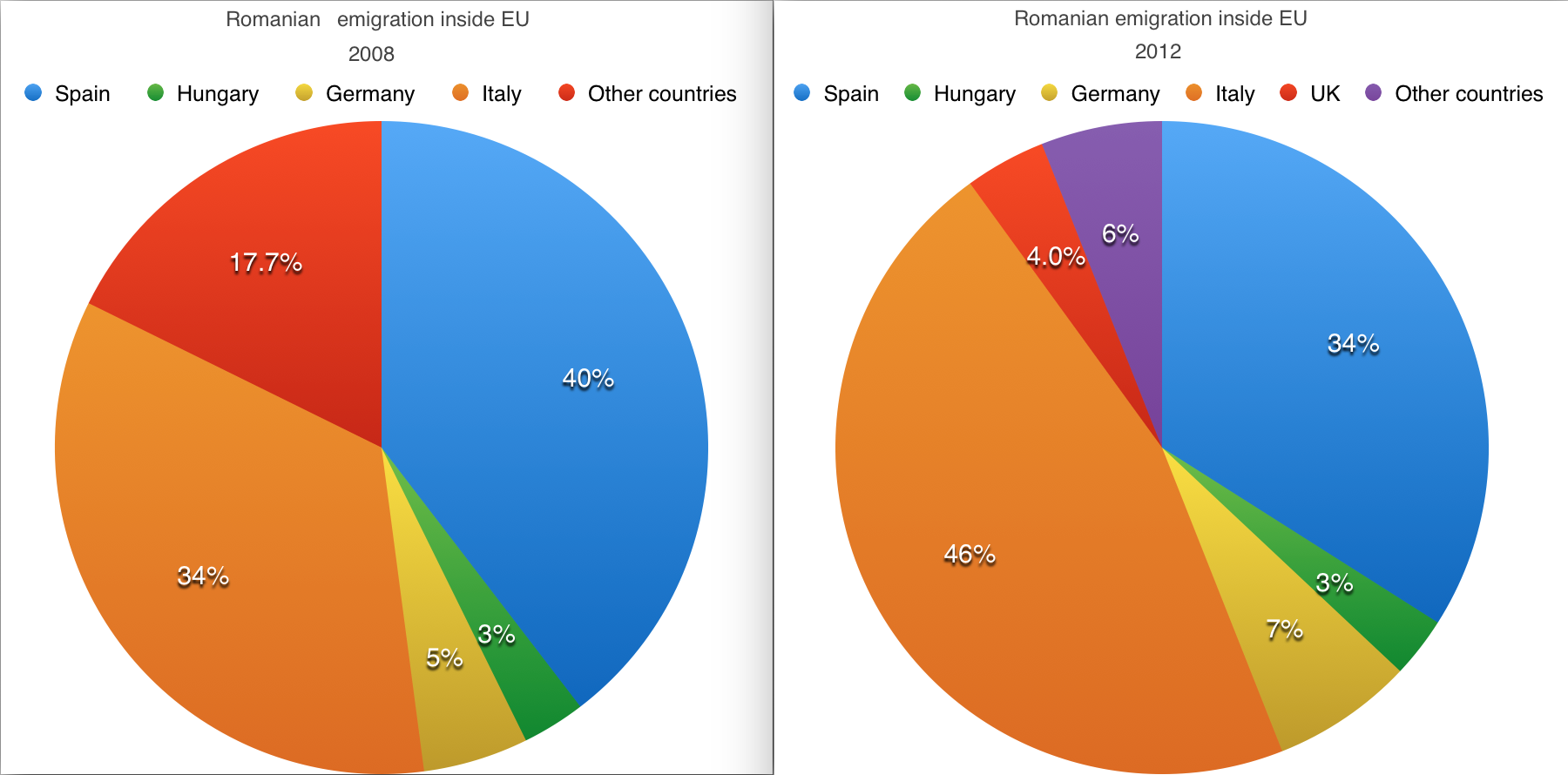
Charts depicting share of Romanians living abroad within other states of the European Union

Most Romanians live in Romania, where they constitute a majority; Romanians also constitute a minority in the countries that neighbour Romania. Romanians can also be found in many countries, notably in the other EU countries, particularly in Italy, Spain, Germany, the United Kingdom and France; in North America in the United States and Canada; in Israel; as well as in Brazil, Australia, Argentina, and New Zealand among many other countries. Italy and Spain have been popular emigration destinations, due to a relatively low language barrier, and both are each now home to about a million Romanians. With respect to geopolitical identity, many individuals of Romanian ethnicity in Moldova prefer to identify themselves as Moldovans.

The contemporary total population of ethnic Romanians cannot be stated with any degree of certainty. A disparity can be observed between official sources (such as census counts) where they exist, and estimates which come from non-official sources and interested groups. Several inhibiting factors (not unique to this particular case) contribute towards this uncertainty, which may include:

- A degree of overlap may exist or be shared between Romanian and other ethnic identities in certain situations, and census or survey respondents may elect to identify with one particular ancestry but not another, or instead identify with multiple ancestries;
- Counts and estimates may inconsistently distinguish between Romanian nationality and Romanian ethnicity (i.e. not all Romanian nationals identify with Romanian ethnicity, and vice versa);
- The measurements and methodologies employed by governments to enumerate and describe the ethnicity and ancestry of their citizens vary from country to country. Thus the census definition of "Romanian" might variously mean Romanian-born, of Romanian parentage, or also include other ethnic identities as Romanian which otherwise are identified separately in other contexts.

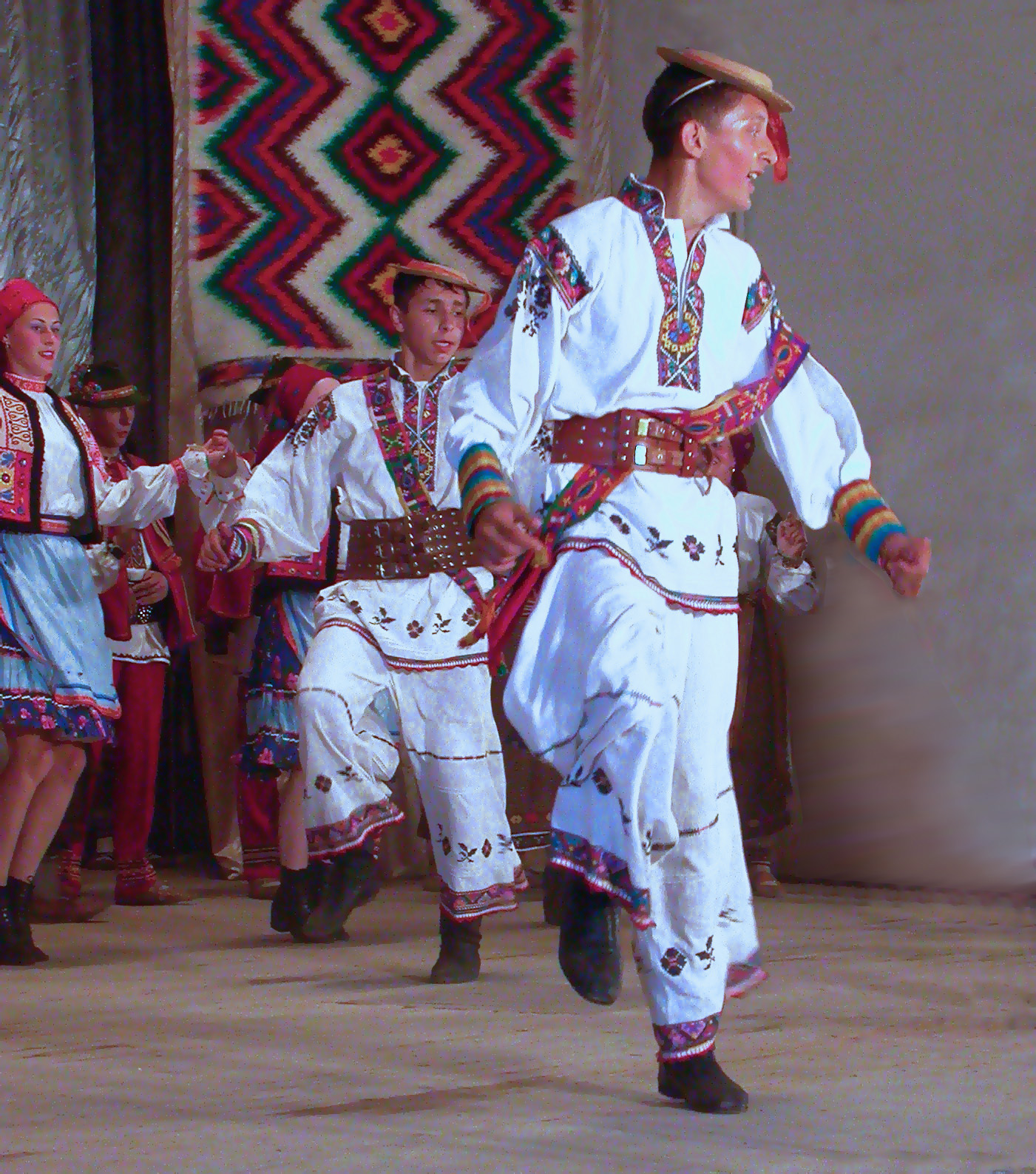
Romanians of Zakarpattia Oblast in Carpathian Ruthenia, western Ukraine, performing a traditional dance.

For example, the decennial US Census of 2000 calculated (based on a statistical sampling of household data) that there were 367,310 respondents indicating Romanian ancestry (roughly 0.1% of the total population).

The actual total recorded number of foreign-born Romanians was only 136,000. However, some non-specialist organisations have produced estimates which are considerably higher: a 2002 study by the Romanian-American Network Inc. mentions an estimated figure of 1,200,000 for the number of Romanian Americans. Which makes the United States home to the largest Romanian community outside Romania.

This estimate notes however that "...other immigrants of Romanian national minority groups have been included such as: Armenians, Germans, Gypsies, Hungarians, Jews, and Ukrainians". It also includes an unspecified allowance for second- and third-generation Romanians, and an indeterminate number living in Canada. An error range for the estimate is not provided. For the United States 2000 Census figures, almost 20% of the total population did not classify or report an ancestry, and the census is also subject to undercounting, an incomplete (67%) response rate, and sampling error in general.

In Republika Srpska, one of the two entities constituting Bosnia and Herzegovina together with the Federation of Bosnia and Herzegovina, Romanians are legally recognized as an ethnic minority.

== Culture ==
=== Contributions to contemporary culture ===
Romanians have played and contributed a major role in the advancement of the arts, culture, sciences, technology and engineering.

In the history of aviation, Traian Vuia and Aurel Vlaicu built and tested some of the earliest aircraft designs, while Henri Coandă discovered the Coandă effect of fluidics. Victor Babeș discovered more than 50 germs and a cure for a disease named after him, babesiosis; biologist Nicolae Paulescu was among the first scientists to identify insulin. Another biologist, Emil Palade, received the Nobel Prize for his contributions to cell biology. George Constantinescu created the theory of sonics, while mathematician Ștefan Odobleja has been claimed as "the ideological father behind cybernetics" – his work The Consonantist Psychology (Paris, 1938) was supposedly the main source of inspiration for N. Wiener's Cybernetics (Paris, 1948). Lazăr Edeleanu was the first chemist to synthesize amphetamine and also invented the modern method of refining crude oil.

In sports, Romanians have excelled in a variety of fields, such as football (Gheorghe Hagi), gymnastics (Nadia Comăneci, Lavinia Miloșovici etc.), tennis (Ilie Năstase, Ion Țiriac, Simona Halep), rowing (Ivan Patzaichin) and handball (four times men's World Cup winners). Count Dracula is a worldwide icon of Romania. This character was created by the Irish fiction writer Bram Stoker, based on some stories spread in the late Middle Ages by the frustrated German tradesmen of Kronstadt (Brașov) and on some vampire folk tales about the historic Romanian figure of Prince Vlad Țepeș.

=== Religion ===
Almost 90% of all Romanians consider themselves religious. The vast majority are Eastern Orthodox Christians, belonging to the Romanian Orthodox Church (a branch of Eastern Orthodoxy, or Eastern Orthodox Church, together with the Greek Orthodox, Orthodox Church of Georgia and Russian Orthodox Churches, among others). Romanians form the third largest ethno-linguistic group among Eastern Orthodox in the world.

According to the 2022 census, 91.5% of ethnic Romanians in Romania identified themselves as Romanian Orthodox (in comparison to 73.6% of Romania's total population, including other ethnic groups), followed by 3.6% as Protestants and 2.5% as Catholics. However, the actual rate of church attendance is significantly lower and many Romanians are only nominally believers. For example, according to a 2006 Eurobarometer poll, only 23% of Romanians attend church once a week or more. A 2006 poll conducted by the Open Society Foundations found that only 33% of Romanians attended church once a month or more.

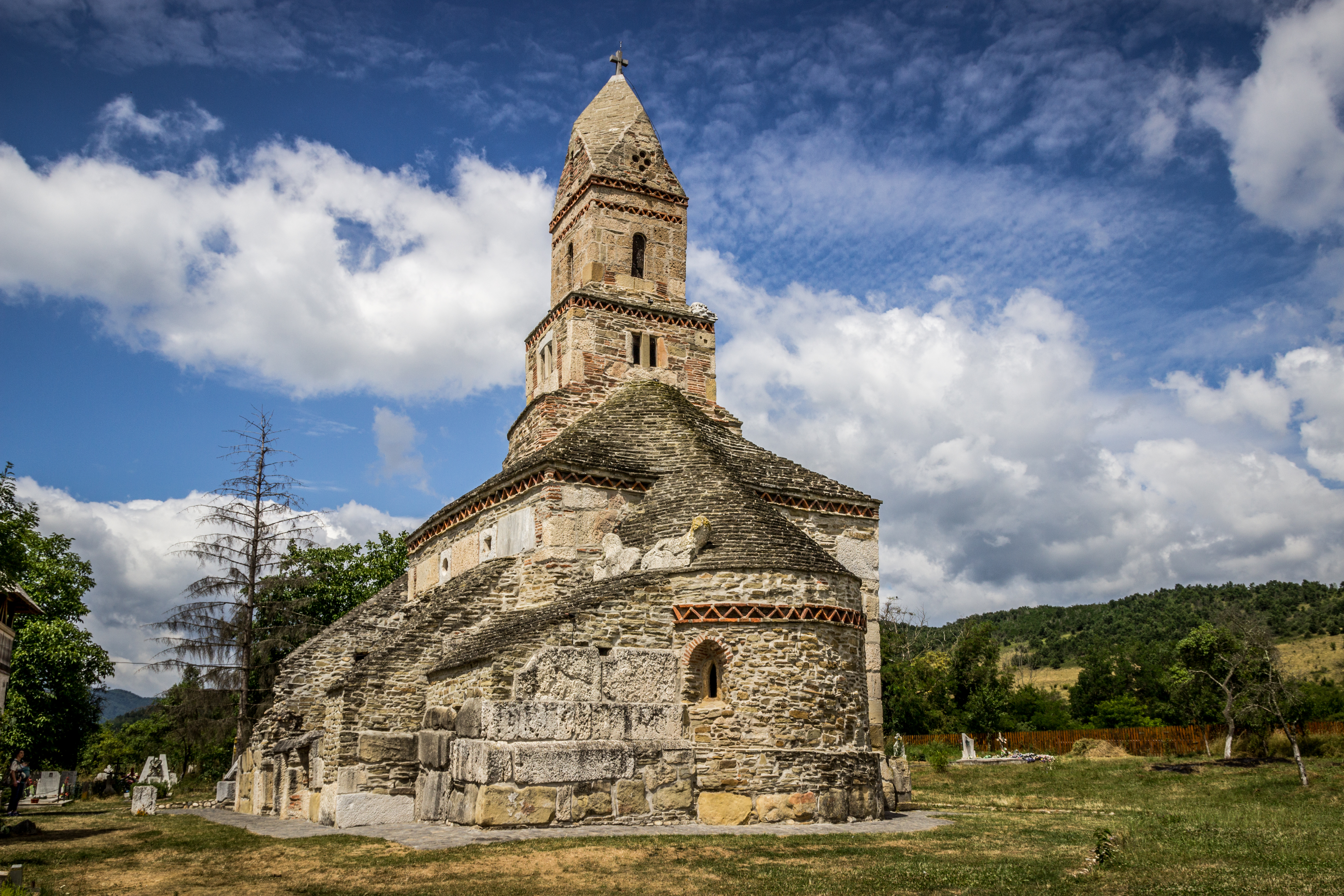
Romano-Gothic Densuș Church, Hunedoara, Transylvania

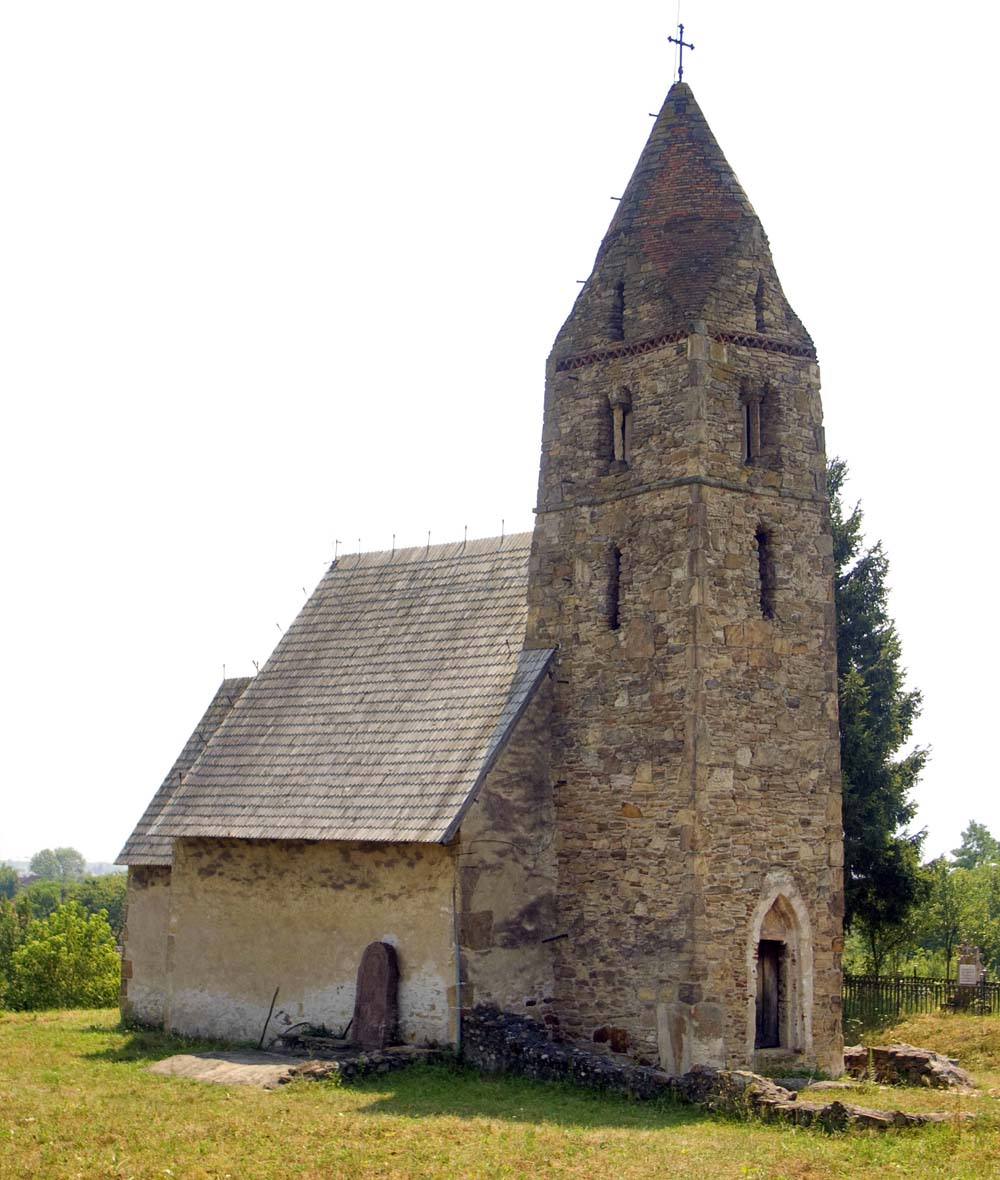
Romano-Gothic Strei Church, Hunedoara, Transylvania

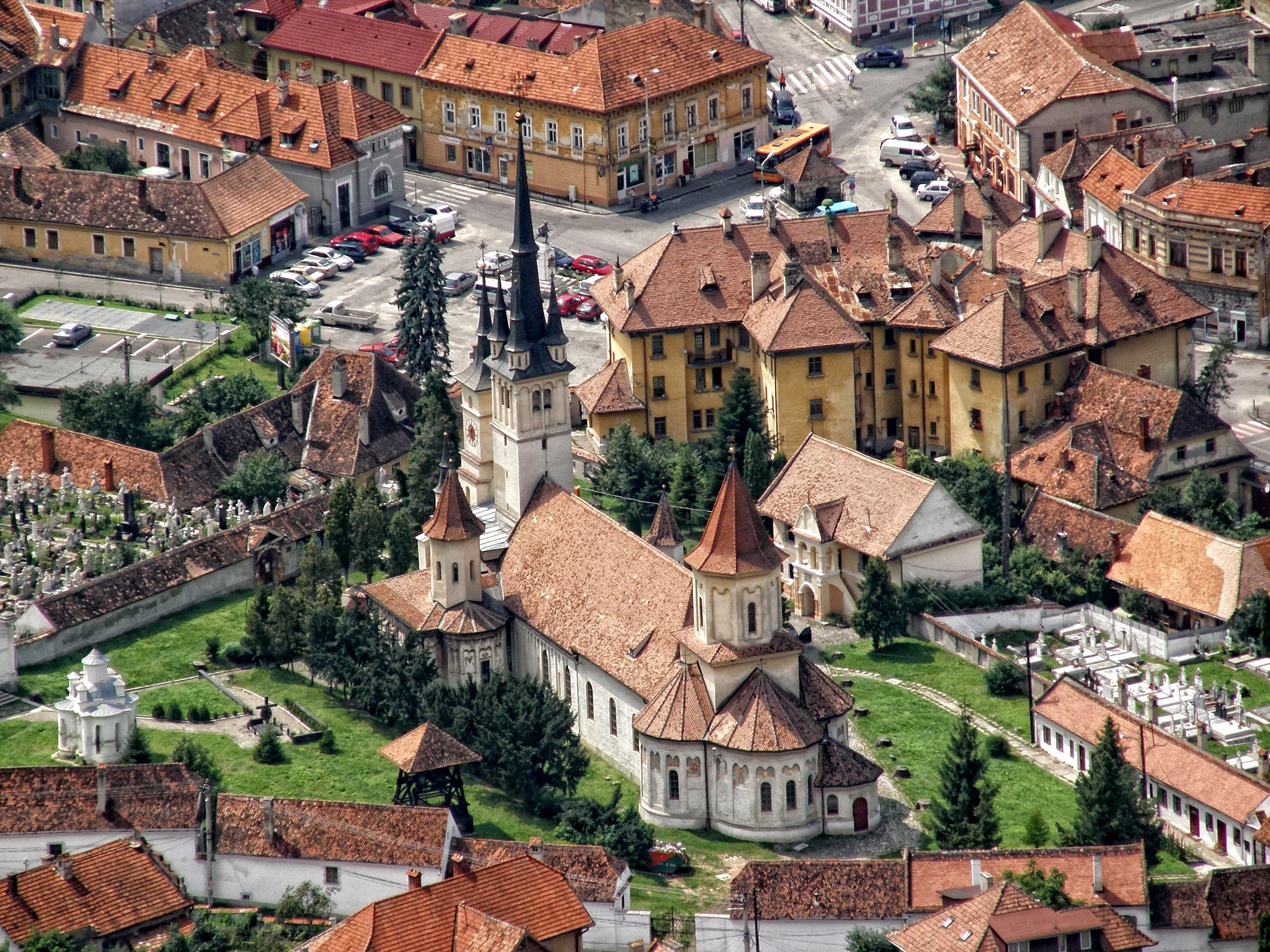
St. Nicholas Church, Brașov, Transylvania

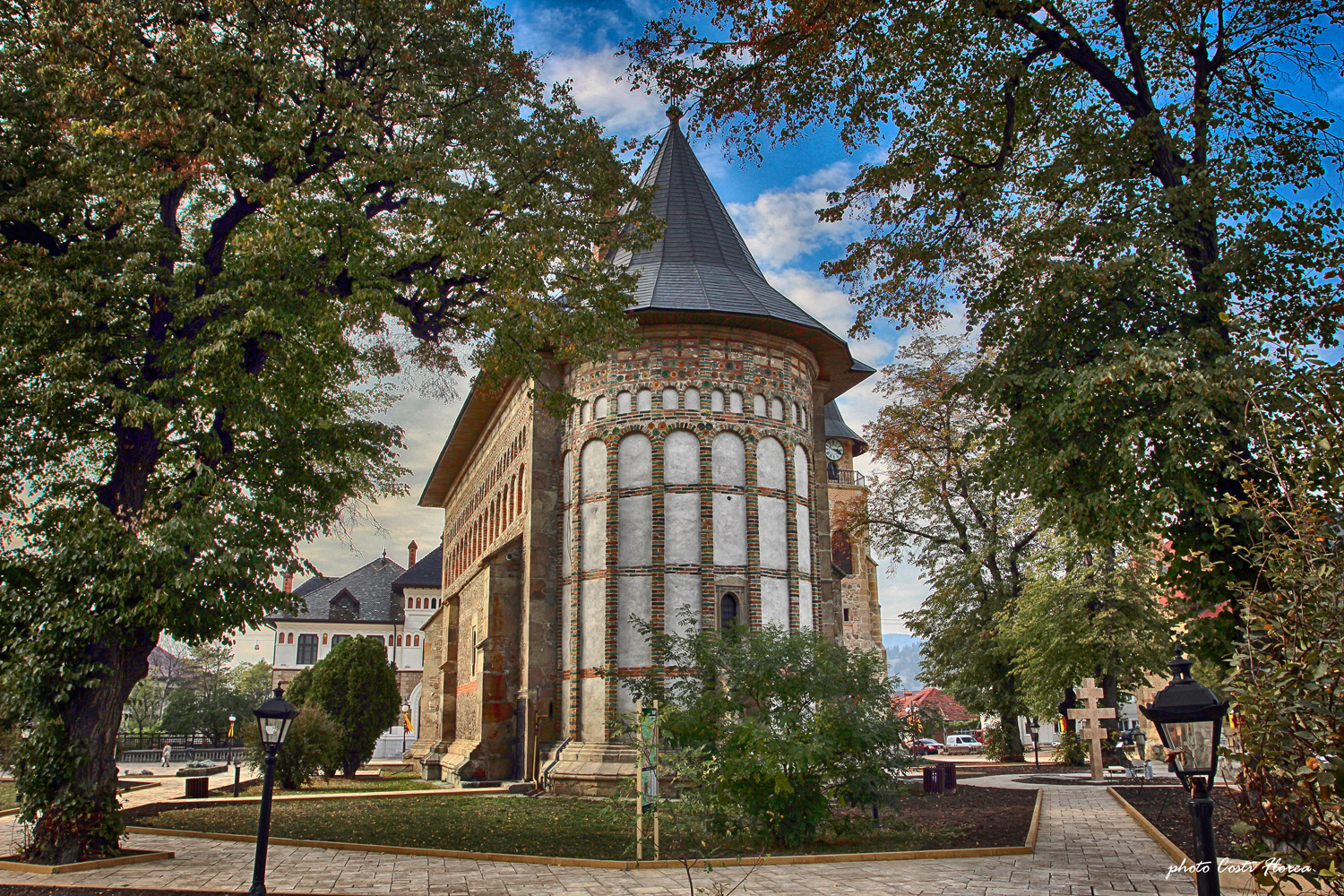
Nativity of St. John the Baptist Church, Piatra Neamț, Moldavia

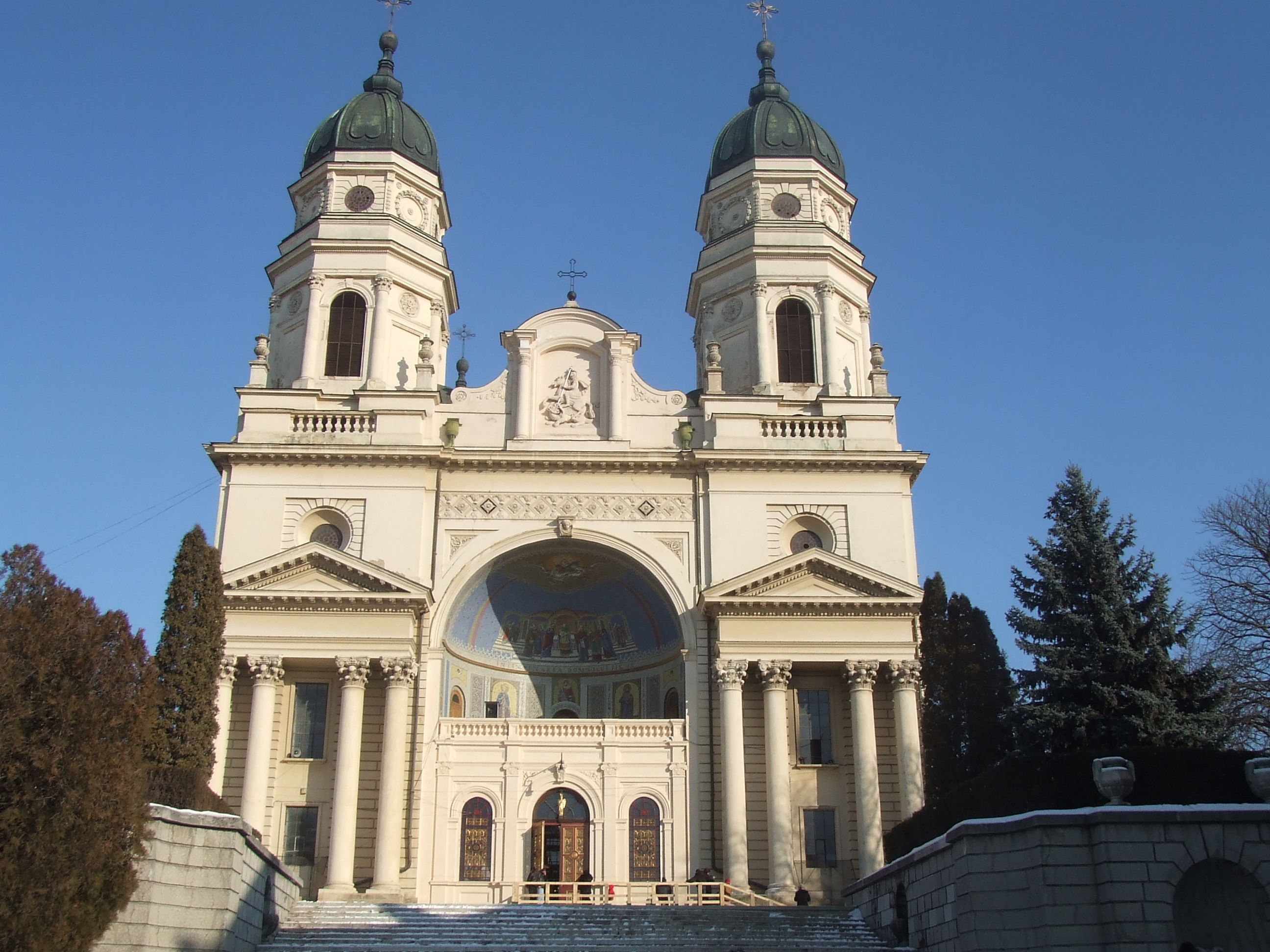
Metropolitan Cathedral, Iași, Moldavia

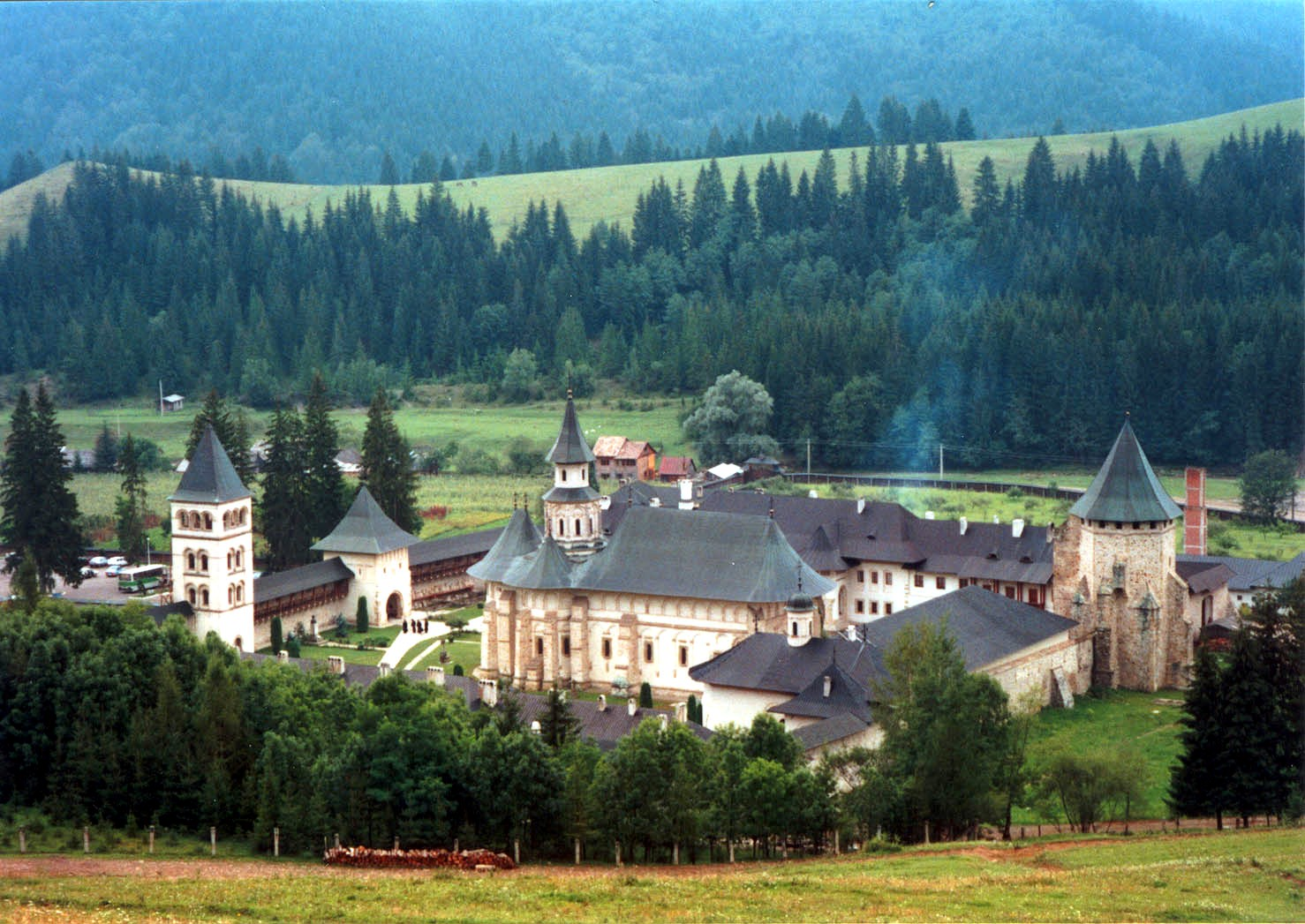
Putna Monastery, Bukovina

Romanian Catholics are present in Transylvania, Banat, Bukovina, Bucharest, and parts of Moldavia, belonging to both the Roman Catholic Church (297,246 members) and the Romanian Greek Catholic Church (124,563 members). According to the 2011 Romanian census, 2.5% of ethnic Romanians in Romania identified themselves as Catholic (in comparison to 5% of Romania's total population, including other ethnic groups). Around 1.6% of ethnic Romanians in Romania identify themselves as Pentecostal, with the population numbering 276,678 members. Smaller percentages are Protestant, Jews, Muslims, agnostic, atheist, or practice a traditional religion.

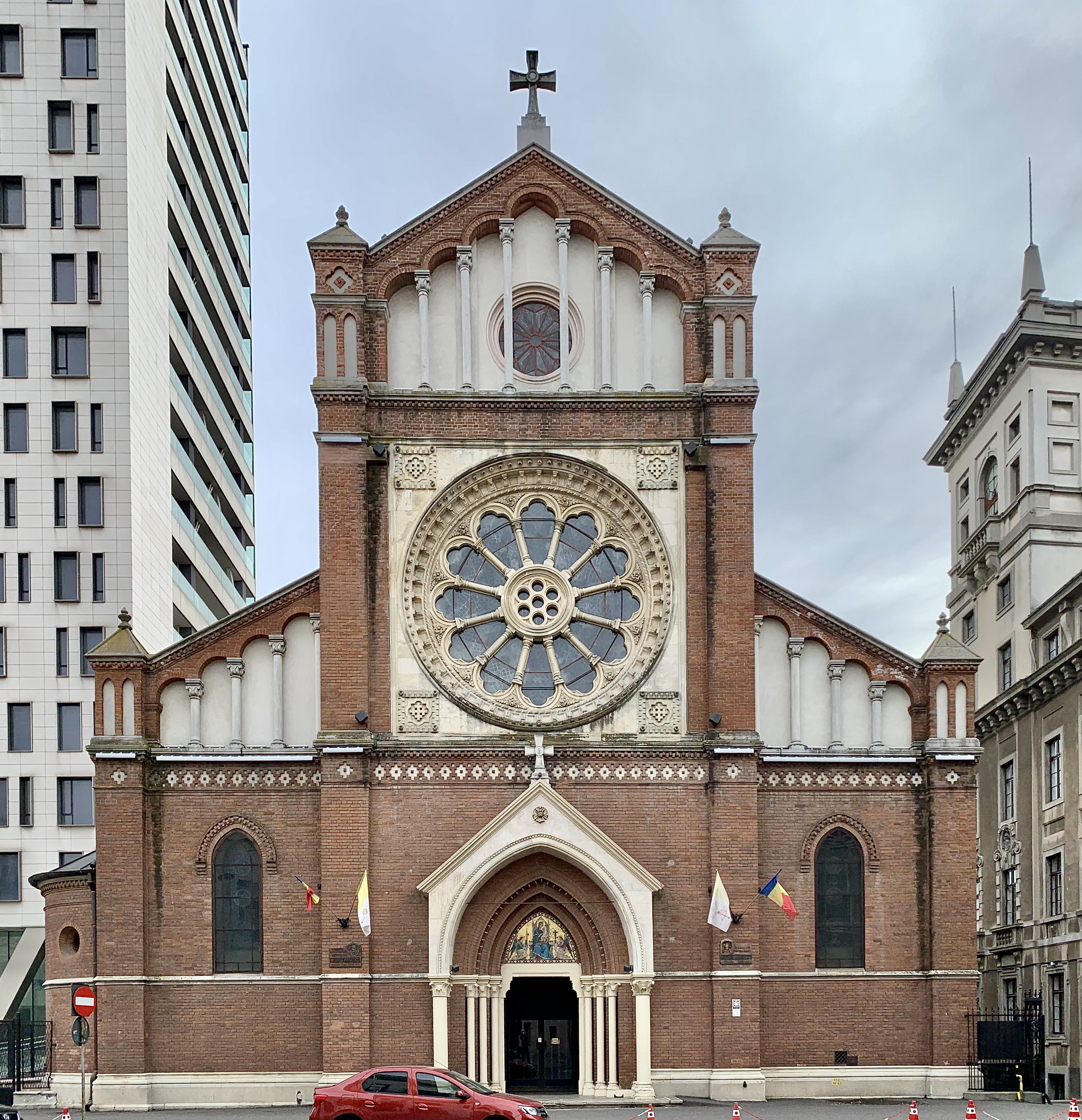
Roman Catholic Saint Joseph Cathedral, Bucharest, Wallachia

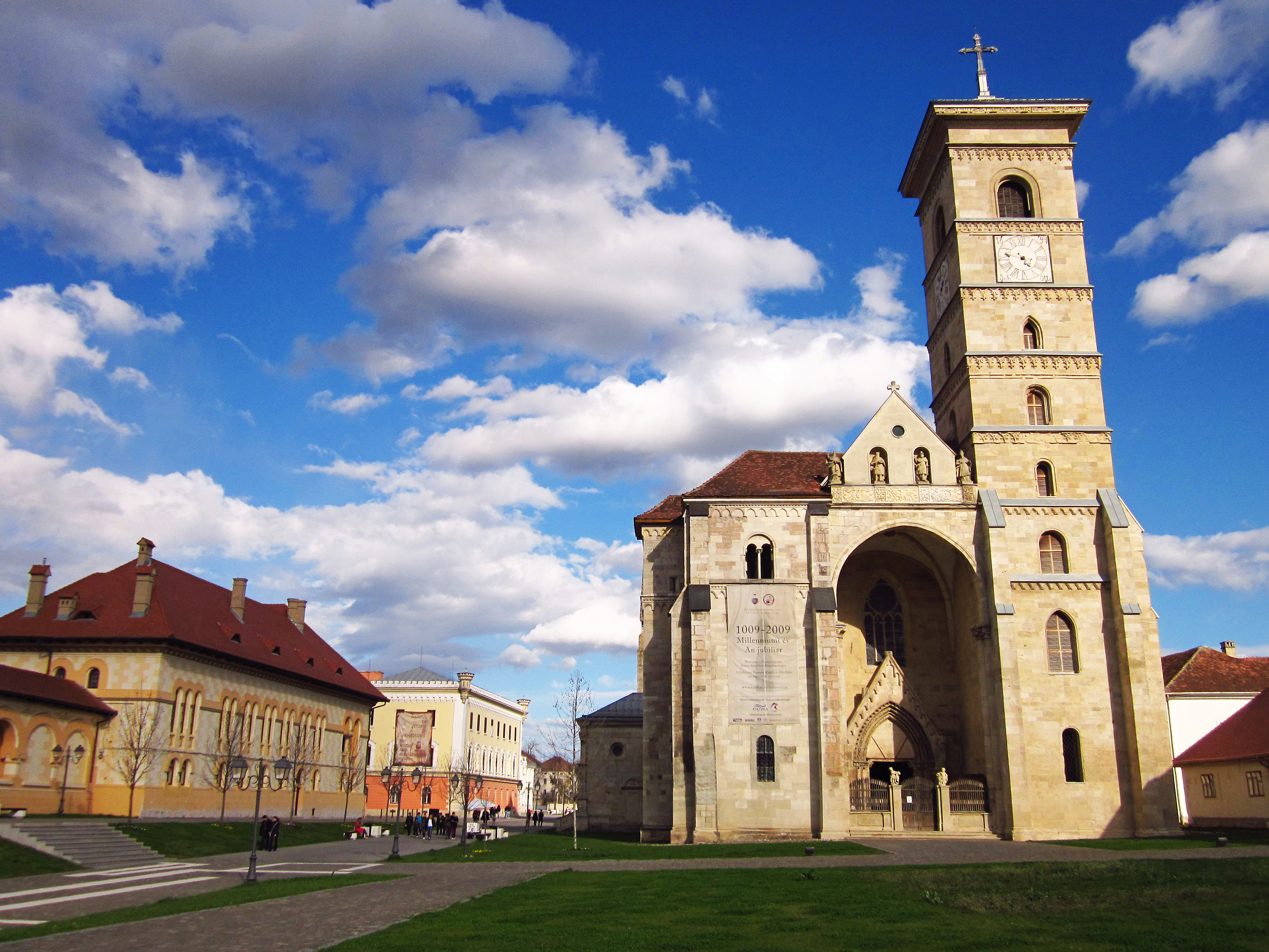
Roman Catholic St. Michael's Cathedral, Alba Iulia, Transylvania

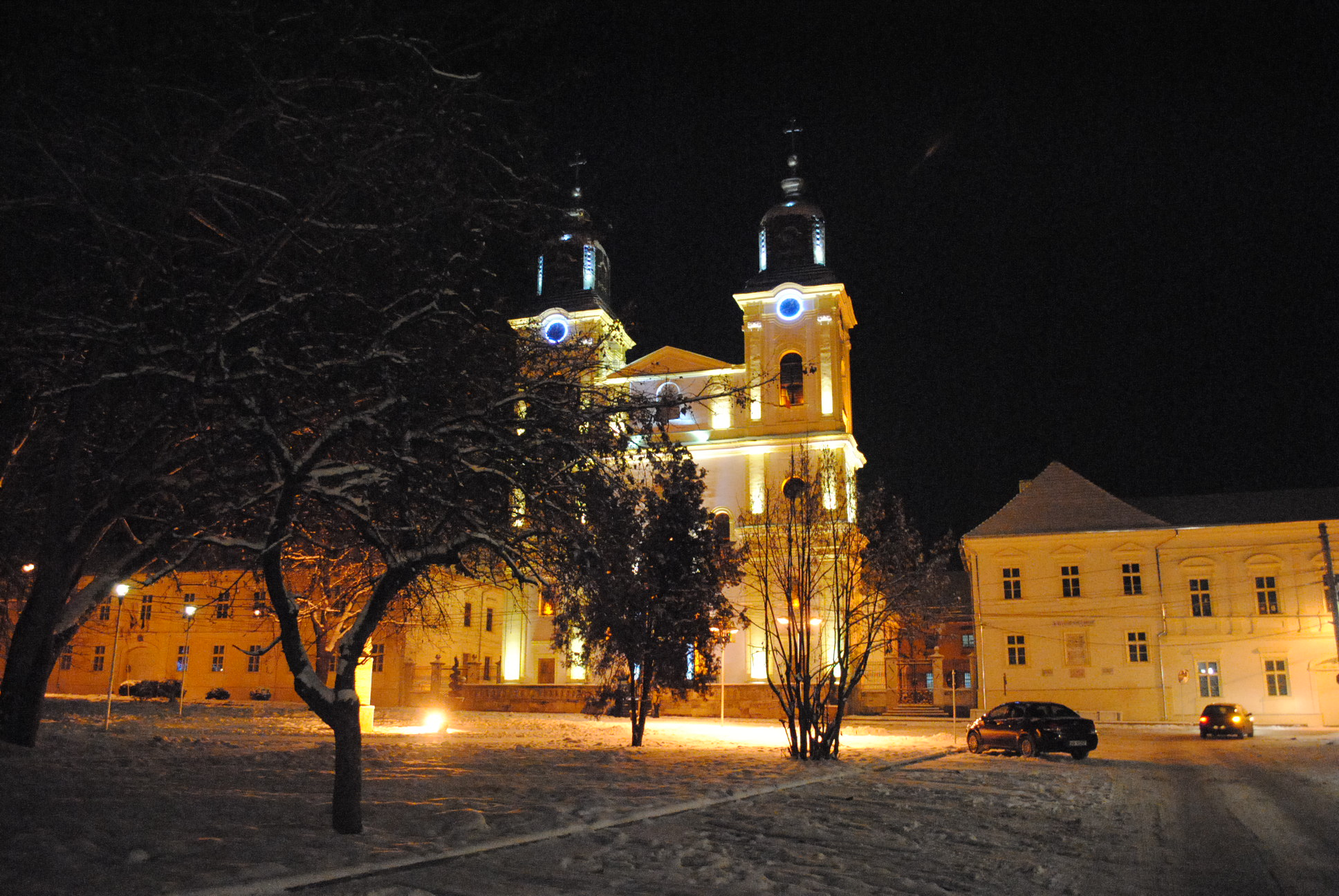
Greek Catholic Cathedral of the Holy Trinity, Blaj, Transylvania

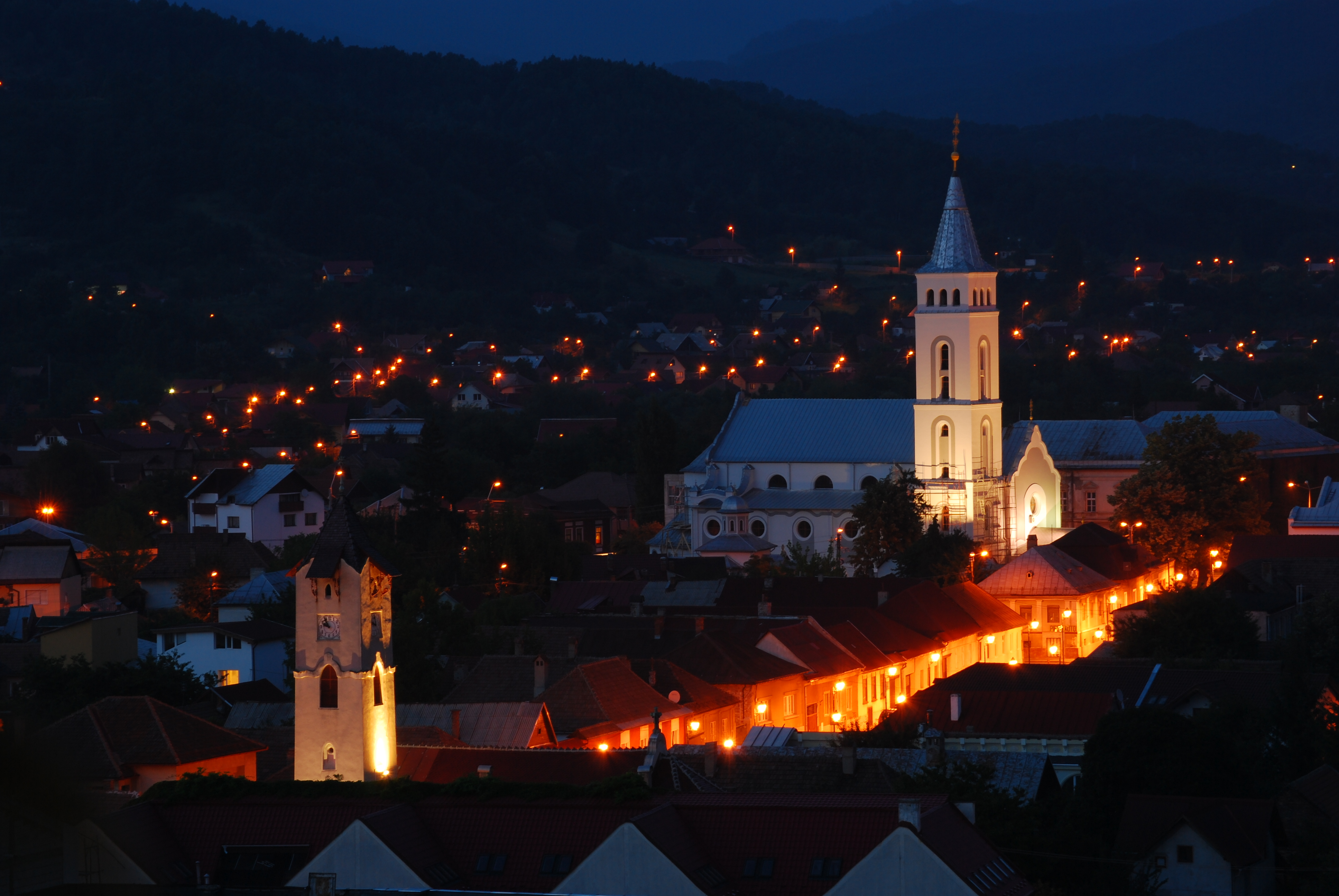
Greek Catholic Assumption of Mary Cathedral, Baia Mare, Transylvania

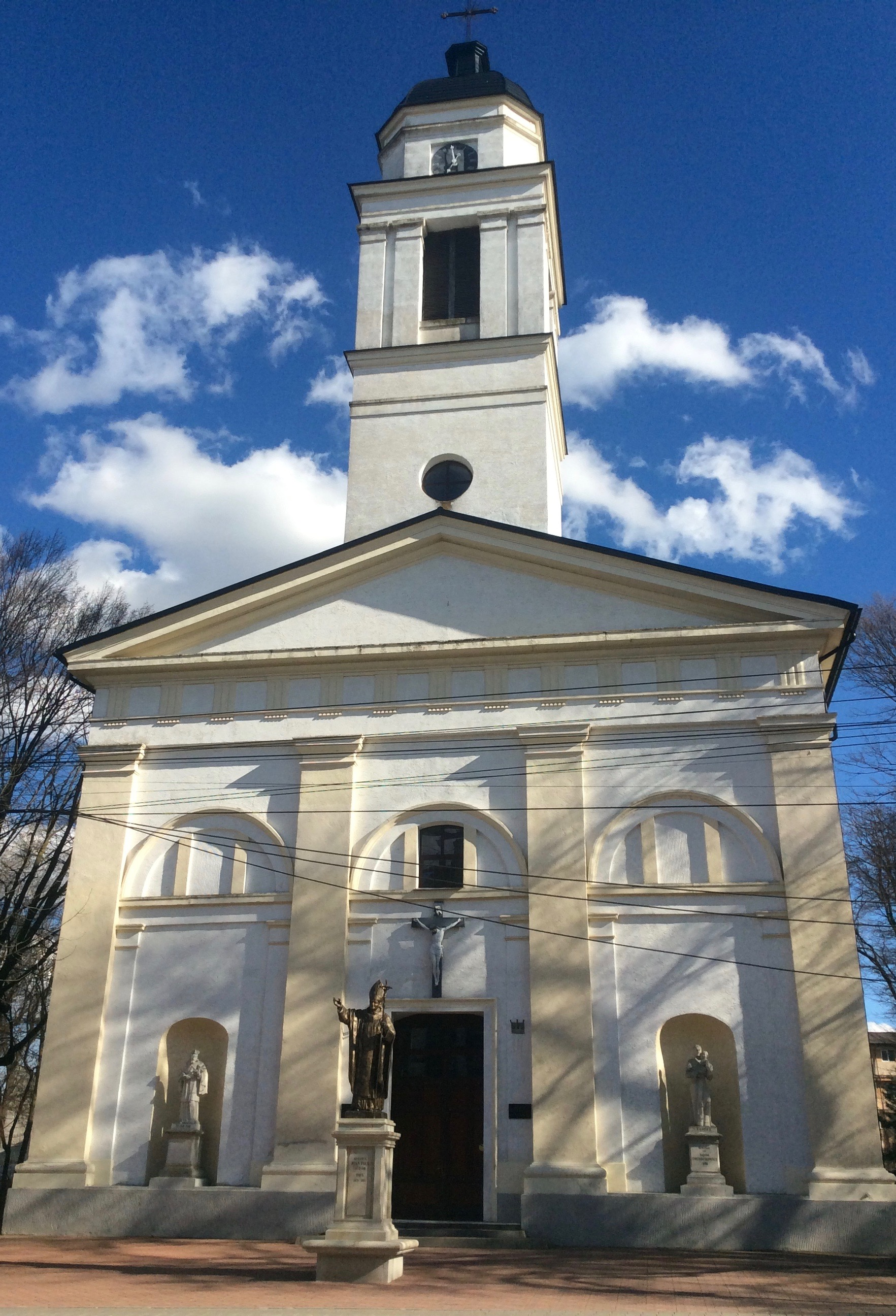
Roman Catholic St. John of Nepomuk Church, Suceava, Bukovina

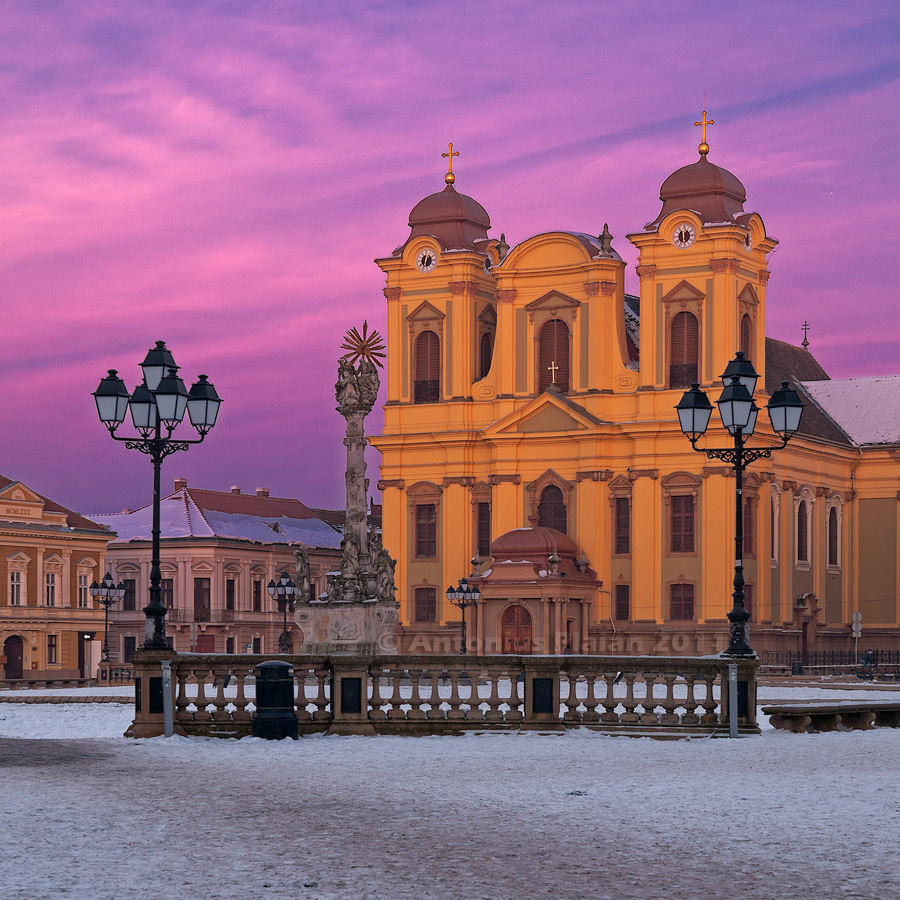
Roman Catholic St. George Cathedral in Timișoara, Banat

There are no official dates for the adoption of religions by the Romanians. Based on linguistic and archaeological findings, historians suggest that the Romanians' ancestors acquired polytheistic religions in the Roman era, later adopting Christianity, most likely by the 4th century AD when decreed by Emperor Constantine the Great as the official religion of the Roman Empire. Like in all other Romance languages, the basic Romanian words related to Christianity are inherited from Latin, such as God (Dumnezeu < Domine Deus), church (biserică < basilica), cross (cruce < crux, -cis), angel (înger < angelus), saint (regional: sfân(t) < sanctus), Christmas (Crăciun < creatio, -onis), Christian (creștin < christianus), Easter (paște < paschae), sin (păcat < peccatum), to baptise (a boteza < batizare), priest (preot < presbiterum), to pray (a ruga < rogare), faith (credință < credentia), and so on.

After the Roman Catholic-Eastern Orthodox Schism of 1054, there existed a Roman Catholic Diocese of Cumania for a short period of time, from 1228 to 1241. However, this seems to be the exception, rather than the rule, as in both Wallachia and Moldavia the state religion was Eastern Orthodox. Until the 17th century, the official language of the liturgy was Old Church Slavonic (a.k.a. Middle Bulgarian). Then, it gradually changed to Romanian.

=== Symbols ===
National symbols of Romania: the flag (left) and the coat of arms (right)

In addition to the colours of the Romanian flag, each historical province of Romania has its own characteristic symbol:

- Banat: Trajan's Bridge
- Dobruja: Dolphin
- Moldavia (including Bukovina and Bessarabia): Aurochs/Wisent
- Oltenia: Lion
- Transylvania (including Crișana and Maramureș): Black eagle or Turul
- Wallachia: Eagle

The coat of arms of Romania combines these together.

=== Customs ===
==== Traditional costumes ====
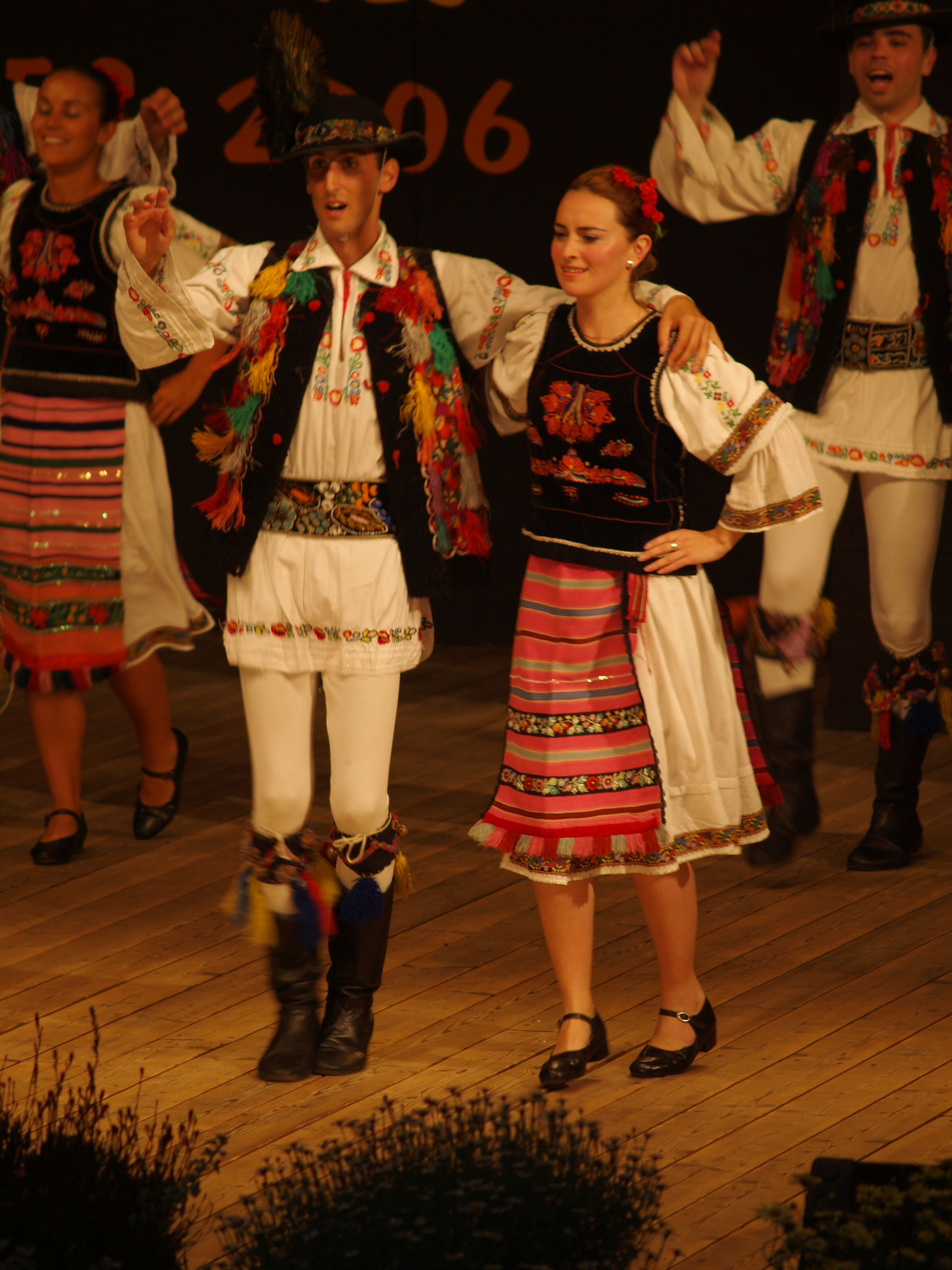
Romanians from Cluj-Napoca, Cluj County, Transylvania, Romania, in traditional folk costumes, dancing on the occasion of the Mărțișor holiday (2006).

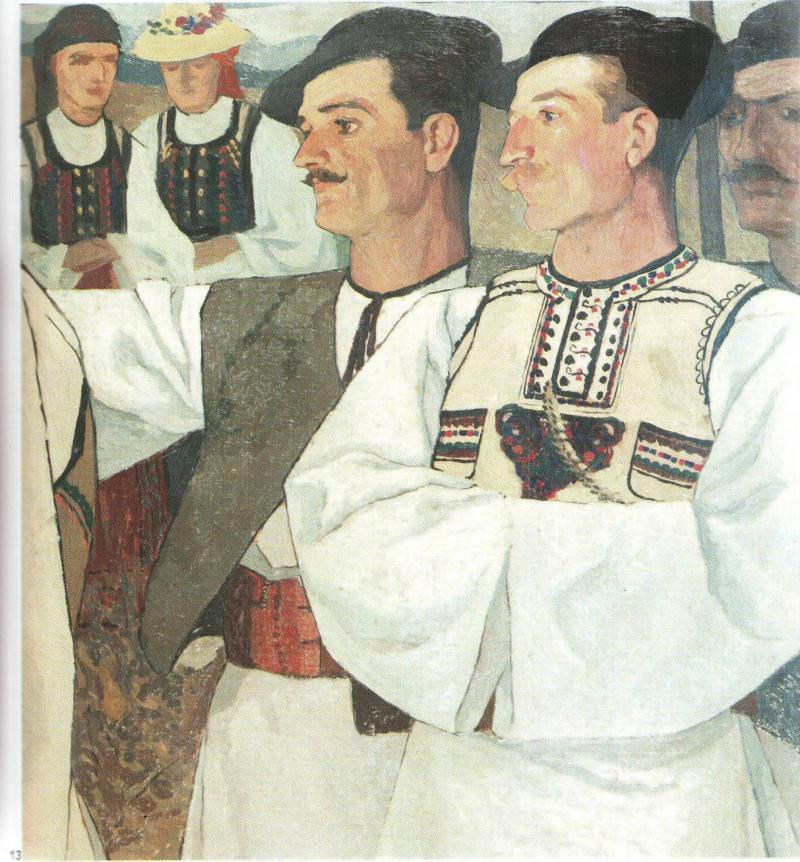
Painting of Transylvanian Romanian peasants from Abrud by Ion Theodorescu-Sion

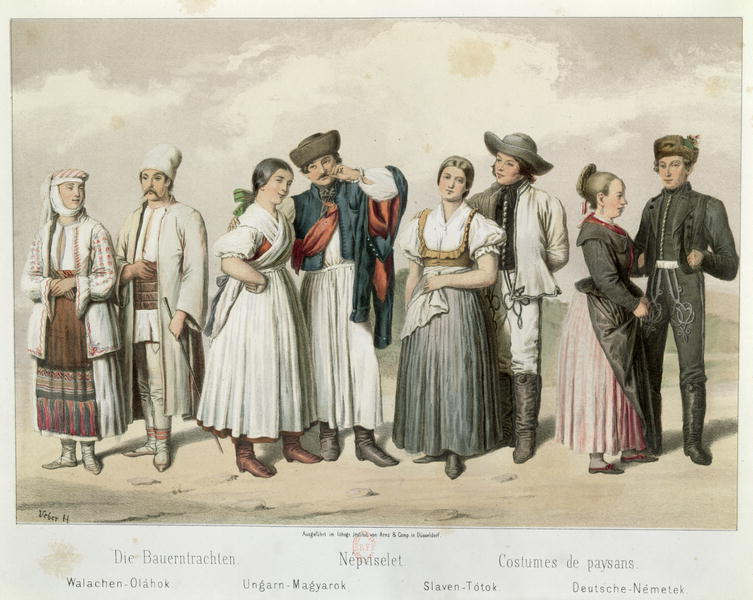
Traditional Romanian peasant costumes to the left, followed from left to right by Hungarian, Slavic, and German ones

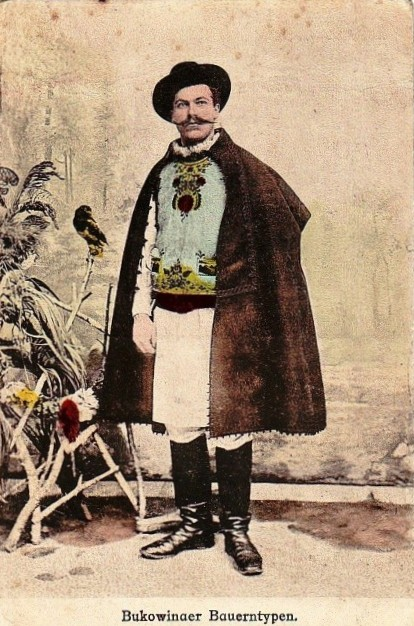
Romanian peasant costume from Bukovina, early 20th century

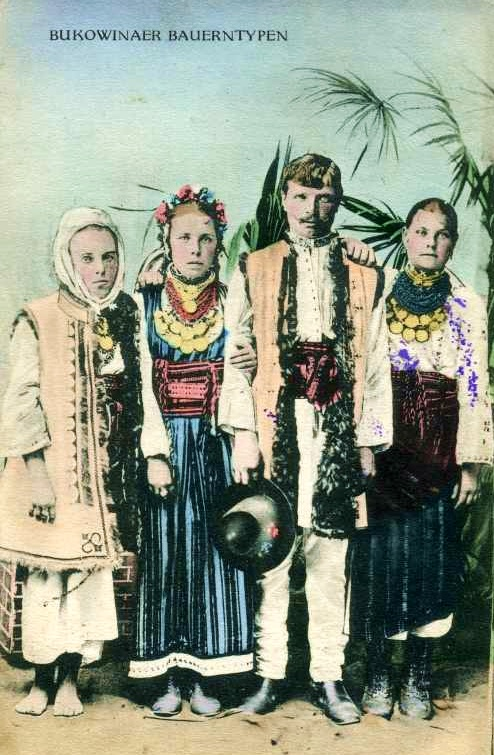
Romanians from Bukovina, early 20th century postcard

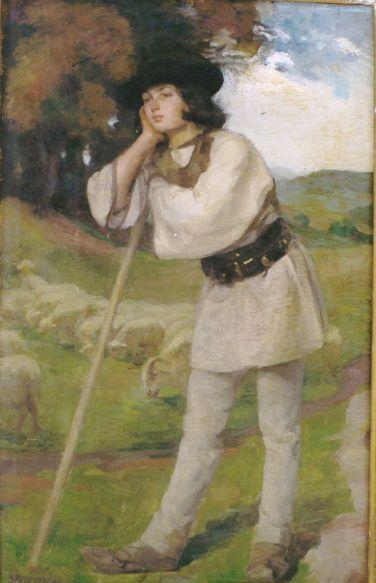
Painting of a young Wallachian shepherd in the early 20th century by Ipolit Strâmbu

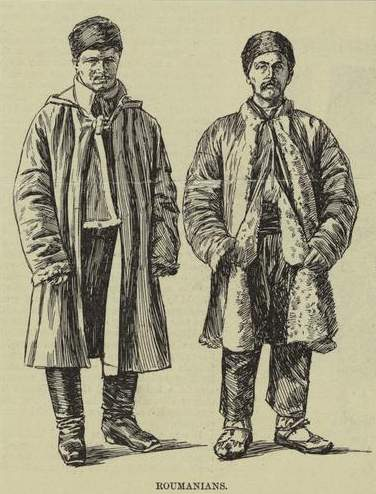
Romanian immigrants in New York City, late 19th century

== Relationship to other ethnic groups ==
The closest ethnic groups to the Romanians are the other Romanic peoples of Southeastern Europe: the Aromanians (Macedo-Romanians), the Megleno-Romanians, and the Istro-Romanians. The Istro-Romanians are the closest ethnic group to the Romanians, and it is believed they left Maramureș, Transylvania about a thousand years ago and settled in Istria, Croatia. Numbering about 500 people still living in the original villages of Istria while the majority left for other countries after World War II (mainly to Italy, United States, Canada, Spain, Germany, France, Sweden, Switzerland, Romania, and Australia), they speak the Istro-Romanian language, the closest living relative of Romanian. On the other hand, the Aromanians and the Megleno-Romanians are Romance peoples who live south of the Danube, mainly in Greece, Albania, North Macedonia and Bulgaria although some of them migrated to Romania in the 20th century. It is believed that they diverged from the Romanians in the 7th to 9th century, and currently speak the Aromanian language and Megleno-Romanian language, both of which are Eastern Romance languages, like Romanian, and are sometimes considered by traditional Romanian linguists to be dialects of Romanian.

== Genetics ==
Romanian haplogroups by regions.

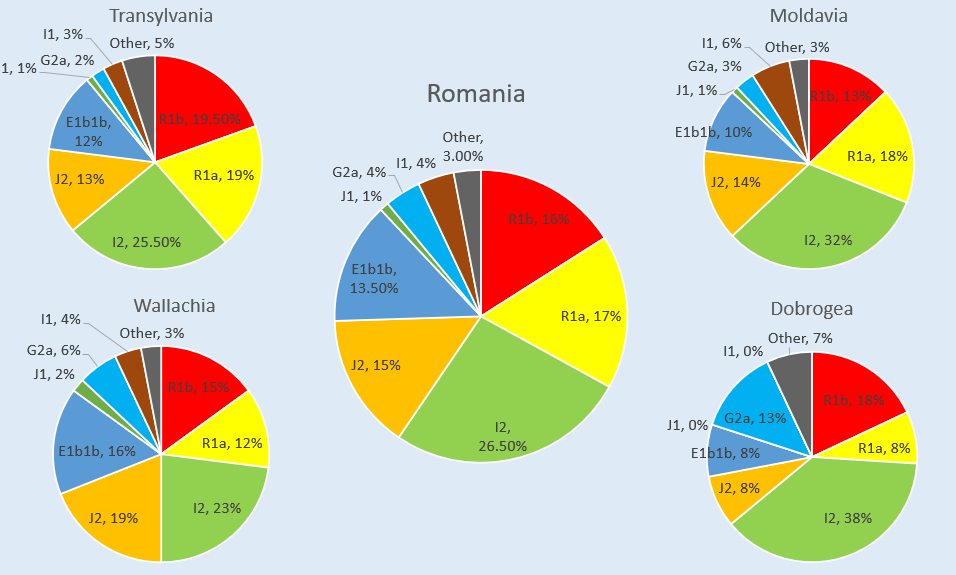
Main Y-DNA haplogroups for average Romanian population and per historical regions.

A Bulgarian study from 2013 shows genetic similarity between Thracians (8-6 century BC), medieval Bulgarians (8–10 century AD), and modern Bulgarians, highlighting highest resemblance between them and Romanians, Northern Italians and Northern Greeks. A genetic study published in Scientific Reports in 2019 examined the mtDNA of 25 Thracian remains in Bulgaria from the 3rd and 2nd millennia BC. They were found to harbor a mixture of ancestry from Western Steppe Herders (WSHs) and Early European Farmers (EEFs), supporting the idea that Southeast Europe was the link between Eastern Europe and the Mediterranean.

The prevailing Y-chromosome in Wallachia (Ploiești, Dolj), Moldavia (Piatra Neamț, Buhuși), Dobruja (Constanța), and northern Republic of Moldova is recorded to be Haplogroup I. Subclades I1 and I2 can be found in most present-day European populations, with peaks in some Northern European and Southeastern European countries. Haplogroup I occurs at 32% in Romanians. The frequency of I2a1 (I-P37) in the Balkans according to older researches was considered to be the result of "pre-Slavic" paleolithic settlement. Peričić et al. (2005) for instance placed its expansion to have occurred "not earlier than the YD to Holocene transition and not later than the early Neolithic". However, the prehistoric autochthonous origin of the haplogroup I2 in the Balkans is now considered as outdated, as already Battaglia et al. (2009) observed highest variance of the haplogroup in Ukraine, and Zupan et al. (2013) noted that it suggests it arrived with Slavic migration from the homeland which was in present-day Ukraine. Although it is dominant among the modern Slavic peoples on the territory of the former Balkan provinces of the Roman Empire, until now it was not found among the samples from the Roman period and is almost absent in contemporary population of Italy. According to Pamjav et al. (2019) and Fóthi et al. (2020), the distribution of such ancestral subclades among contemporary carriers indicates a rapid expansion from Southeastern Poland, and is mainly related to the Slavs and their medieval migration, which led to the largest demographic explosion that occurred in the Balkans. According to a 2023 archaeogenetic study, I2a-L621 is absent in the antiquity and appears only since the Early Middle Ages "always associated with Eastern European related ancestry in the autosomal genome, which supports that these lineages were introduced in the Balkans by Eastern European migrants during the Early Medieval period."

A similar result was cited in a study investigating the genetic pool of people from Republic of Moldova, concluded about the representative samples taken for comparison from Romanians from the towns of Piatra-Neamț and Buhuși that "the most common Y haplogroup in this population was I-M423 (40.7%). This is the highest frequency of the I-M423 haplogroup reported so far outside of the northwest Balkans. The next most frequent among Romanian males was haplogroup R-M17* (16.7%), followed by R-M405 (7.4%), E-v13 and R-M412* (both 5.6%)." The I-M423 haplogroup is a subclade of I2a, a haplogroup prosperous in the Starcevo culture and its possible offshoot Cucuteni–Trypillia culture (4800-3000 BCE). The high concentration of I2a1b-L621, the main subclade, is attributed to the medieval Slavic migrations.

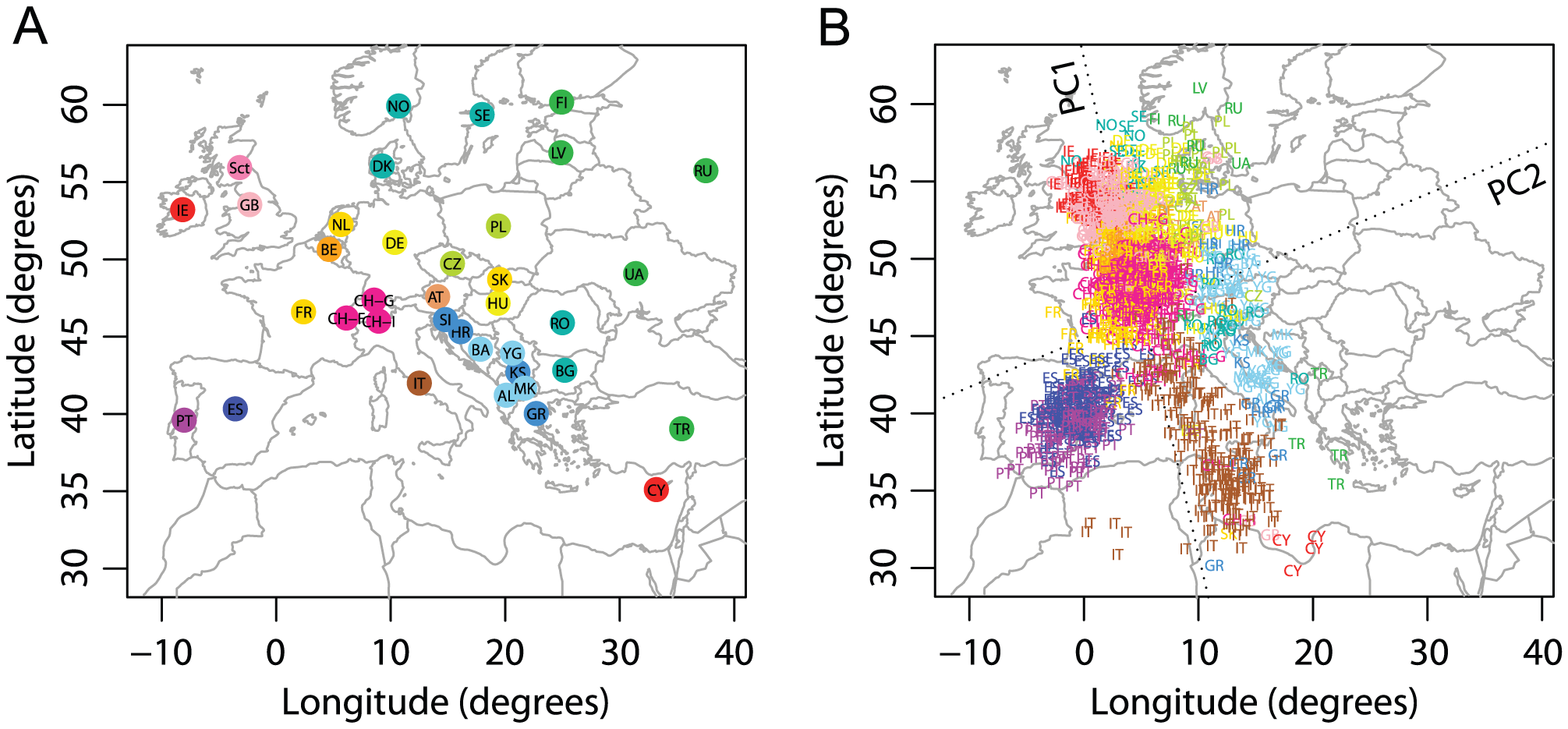
Procrustes-transformed PCA plot of genetic variation of European populations. (A) Geographic coordinates of 37 populations. (B) Procrustes-transformed PCA plot of genetic variation. The Procrustes analysis is based on the unprojected latitude-longitude coordinates and PC1-PC2 coordinates of 1378 individuals.

According to a Y-chromosome analysis of 335 sampled Romanians, 15% of them belong to R1a. Haplogroup R1a, is a human Y-chromosome DNA haplogroup which is distributed in a large region in Eurasia, extending from Scandinavia and Central Europe to southern Siberia and South Asia. Haplogroup R1a among Romanians is entirely from the Eastern European variety Z282 and may be a result of Baltic, Thracian or Slavic descent. 12% of the Romanians belong to Haplogroup R1b, the Alpino-Italic branch of R1b is at 2% a lower frequency recorded than other Balkan peoples. The eastern branches of R1b represent 7%, they prevail in parts of Eastern and Central Europe as a result of Ancient Greek colonisation – in parts of Sicily as well. Other studies analyzing the haplogroup frequency among Romanians came to similar results.

Delving into the regional differences of Mitochondrial DNA of Romanians, a 2014 study emphasised the different position of North and South Romanian populations (i.e. inside and outside of the Carpathian range) in terms of mitochondrial haplotype variability. The population within the Carpathian range was found to have haplogroup H at 59.7% frequency, U at 11.3%, K and HV at 3.23% each, and M, X and A at 1.61% each. The South Romanian population also showed the highest frequency in haplogroup H at 47% (lower than in the sample from the North of Romania), haplogroup U showed a noticeable frequency at 17% (higher than in the sample from North Romania), haplogroups HV and K at 10.61% and 7.58%, respectively, while haplogroups M, X and A were absent. Comparing the results to European and international samples, the study proposes a weak differentiated distribution of mitochondrial haplogroups between inner and outer Carpathian population (rather than north–south boundary) based on higher frequency for the haplogroup J and haplogroup K2a in the Southern Romanian sample - considered as markers of the Neolithic expansion in Europe from the Near East, the absence of K2a and the presence of haplogroup M in Northern Romanian sample - with higher frequency in Western and Southern Asia, and the inclusion of both Romanian populations within the range of the European mitochondrial variability, rather than being closer to the Near Eastern populations. The North Romanian sample was also found to be slightly separated from the other samples included in the study.

A 2017 paper concentrated on the Mitochondrial DNA of Romanians, showed how Romania has been "a major crossroads between Asia and Europe" and thus "experienced continuous migration and invasion episodes"; while stating that previous studies show Romanians "exhibit genetic similarity with other Europeans". The paper also mentions how "signals of Asian maternal lineages were observed in all Romanian historical provinces, indicating gene flow along the migration routes through East Asia and Europe, during different time periods, namely, the Upper Paleolithic period and/or, with a likely greater preponderance, the Middle Ages", at low frequency (2.24%). The study analysed 714 samples, representative to the 41 counties of Romania, and grouped them in 4 categories corresponding to historical Romanian provinces: Wallachia, Moldavia, Transylvania, and Dobruja. The majority was classified within 9 Eurasian mitochondrial haplogroups (H, U, K, T, J, HV, V, W, and X), while also finding sequences that belonged to the most frequent Asian haplogroups (haplogroups A, C, D, I - at 2.24% overall frequency, and M and N) and African haplogroup L (two samples in Wallachia and one in Dobruja). The H, V, and X haplogroups were detected at higher frequencies in Transylvania, while the frequency of U and N was lower, with M being absent, interpreted as an indicator of genetic proximity of Transylvania to Central European populations, in contrast to the other three provinces, which showed resemblance to Balkan populations. The Dobrujan samples showed a larger contribution of genes from Southwestern Asia which the authors attributed to a larger Asian influence historically and/or its smaller sample size compared to that of the other populations included.

A 2023 archaeogenetic study published in Cell, argued that the spread of Slavic language in Southeastern Europe was because of large movements of people with specific Eastern European ancestry, and that more than half of the ancestry of most peoples in the Balkans today originates from the medieval Slavic migrations, with around 67% in Croats, 58% in Serbs, 55% in Romanians, 51% in Bulgarians, 40% in Greek Macedonians, 31% in Albanians, 30% in Peloponnesian Greeks, and 4–20% in Greeks from the Aegean Islands.

A 2025 archaeogenetic study calculates Medieval Slavic ancestry among Romanians in different regions between 39-50%.

According to genetic study based on Y-dna haplogroups from 2026, the five most frequent haplogroups in Romania are Rla (n = 188; 20.26%), I2a (n = 150; 16.16%), E1b1b (n = 142; 15.30%), J2a (n = 141; 15.19%), and R1b (n = 127; 13.69%), together accounting for 80.6% of the population.

== Ethnogenesis ==
Three theories account for the ethnogenesis of the Romanian people. One, known as the Daco-Roman continuity theory, posits that they are descendants of Romans and Romanized indigenous peoples (Dacians) living in the Roman Province of Dacia, while the other posits that the Romanians are descendants of Romans and Romanized indigenous populations of the former Roman provinces of Illyricum, Moesia, Thracia, and Macedonia, and the ancestors of Romanians later migrated from these Roman provinces south of the Danube into the area which they inhabit today. The third theory also known as the admigration theory, proposed by Dimitrie Onciul (1856–1923), posits that the formation of the Romanian people occurred in the former "Dacia Traiana" province, and in the central regions of the Balkan Peninsula. However, the Balkan Vlachs' northward migration ensured that these centers remained in close contact for centuries. This theory is a compromise between the immigrationist and the continuity theories.

== Demographics ==
The largest ethnic group in Romania is ethnic Romanians, followed by Hungarians and Romani people.

== Maps ==
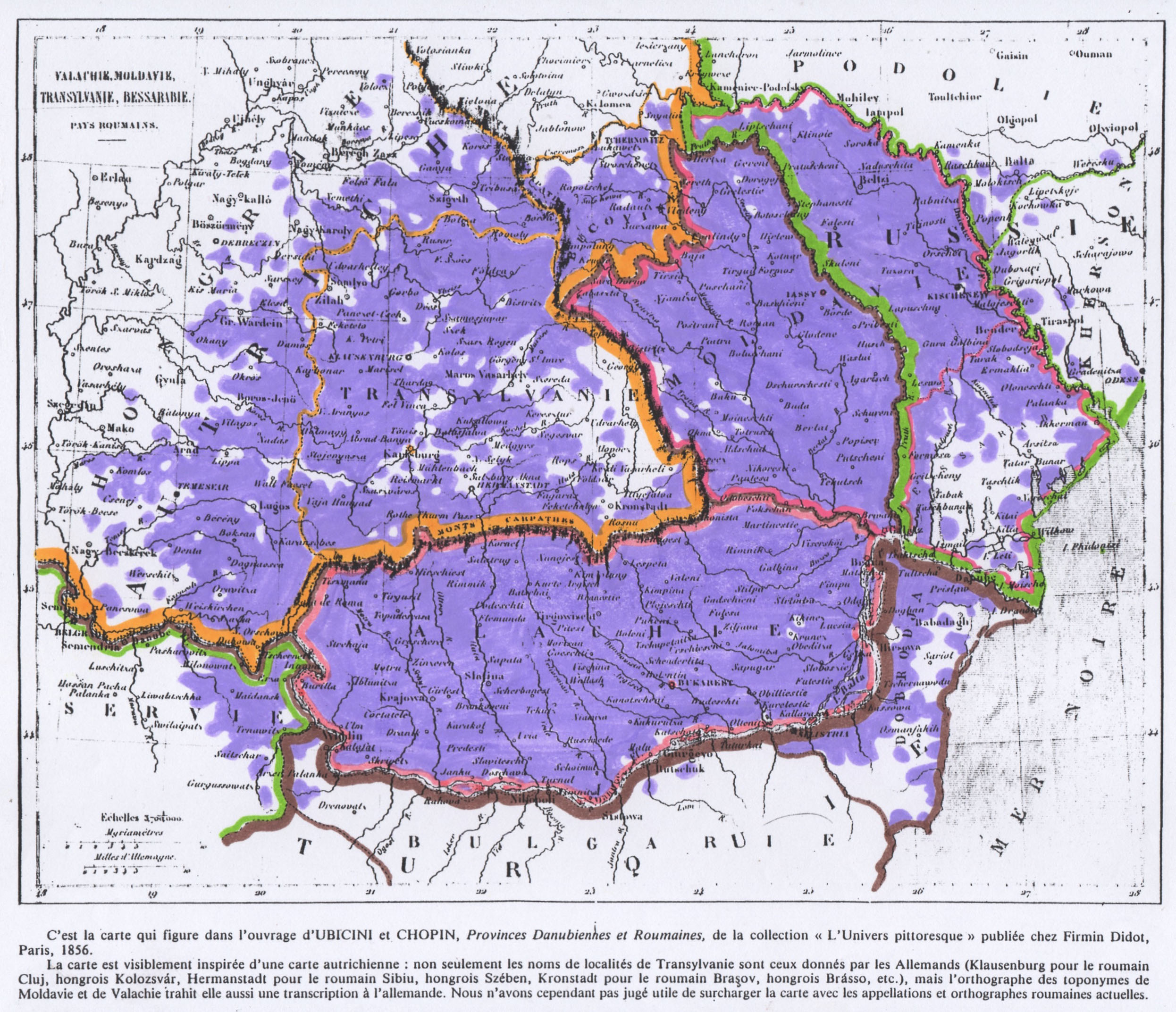
Mid-19th century French map depicting Romanians in Central and Eastern Europe

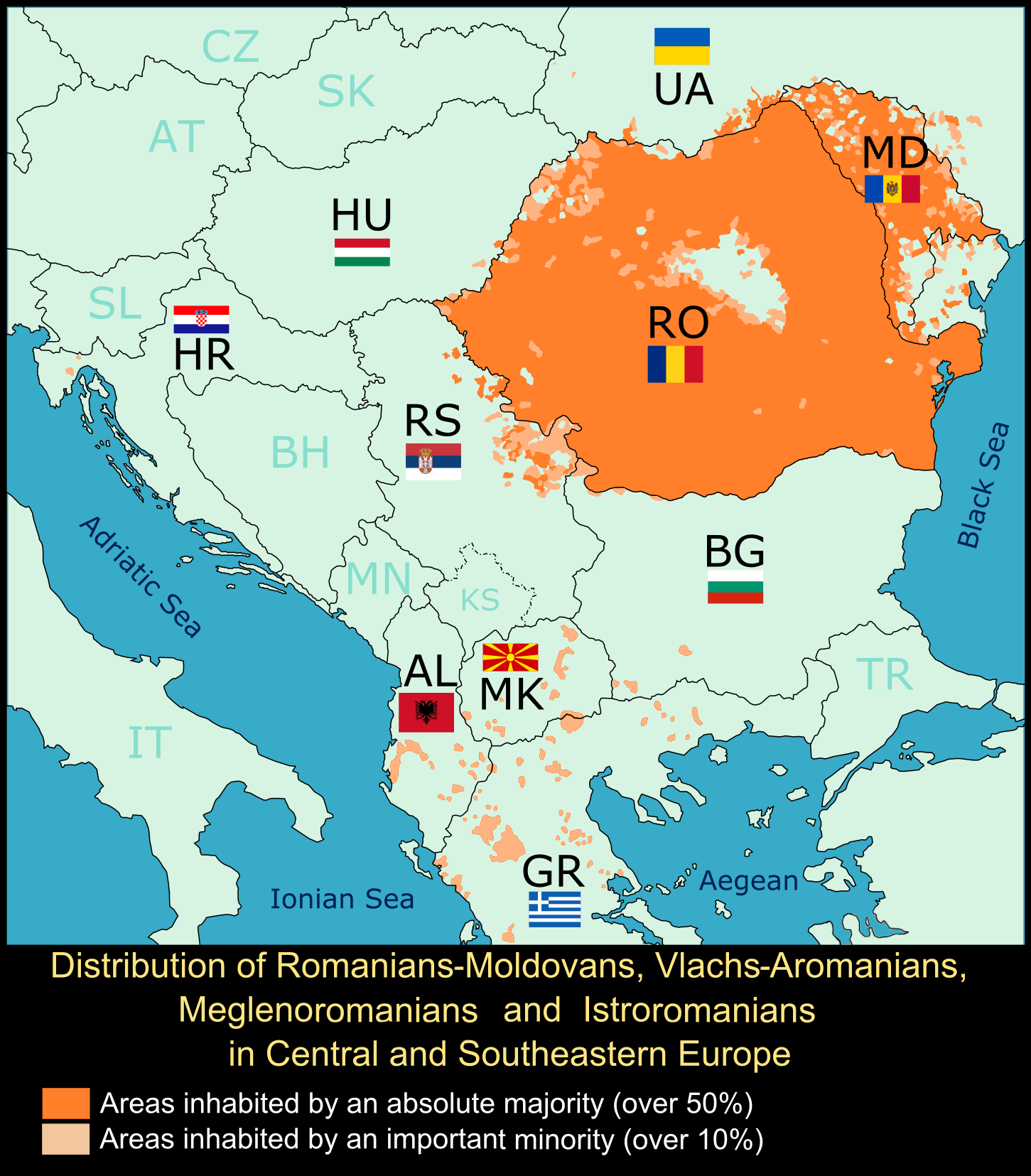
Modern distribution of the Eastern Romance-speaking ethnic groups (including, most notably, the Romanians)

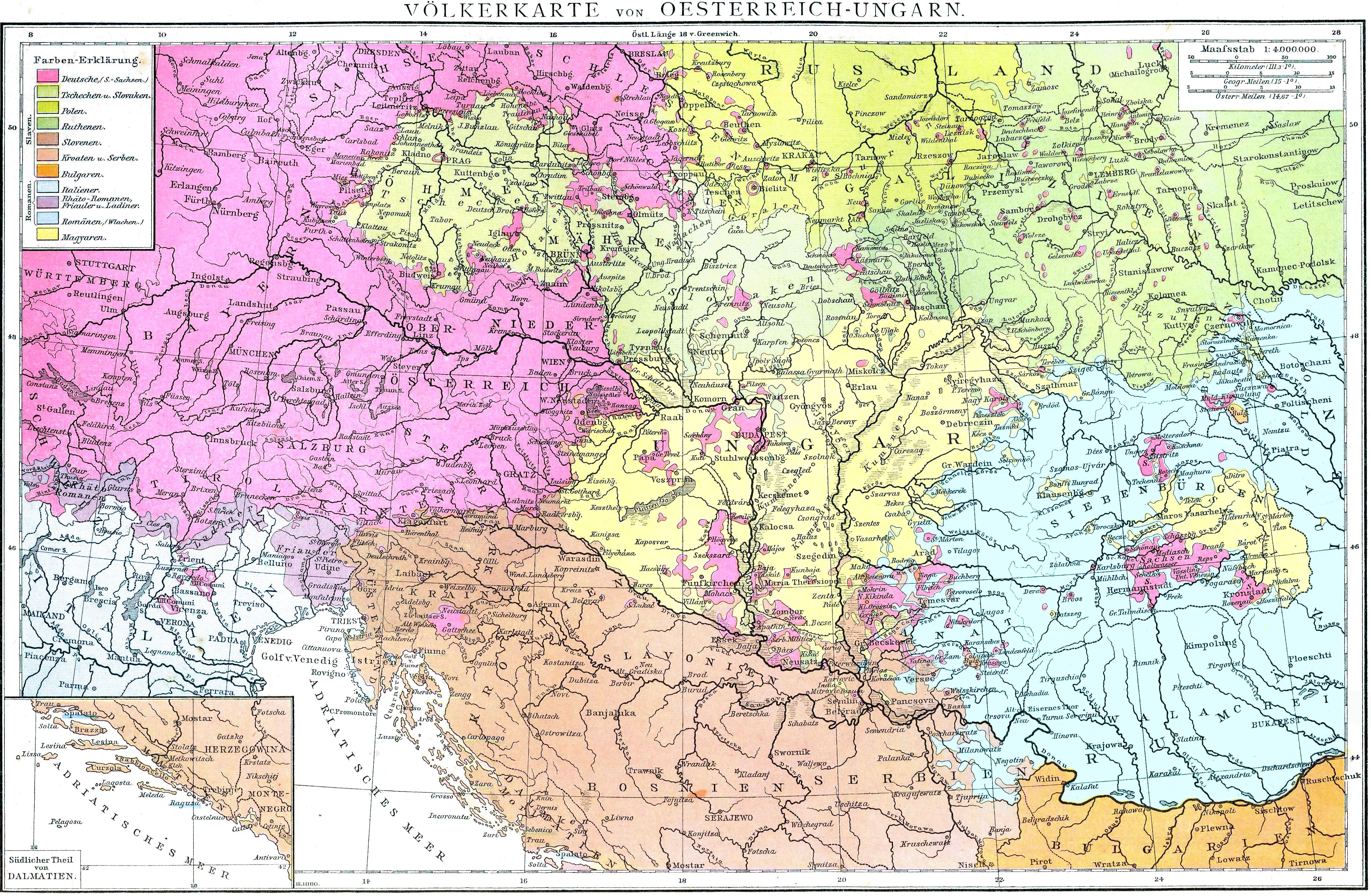
Romanians in Central Europe (coloured in blue), 1880

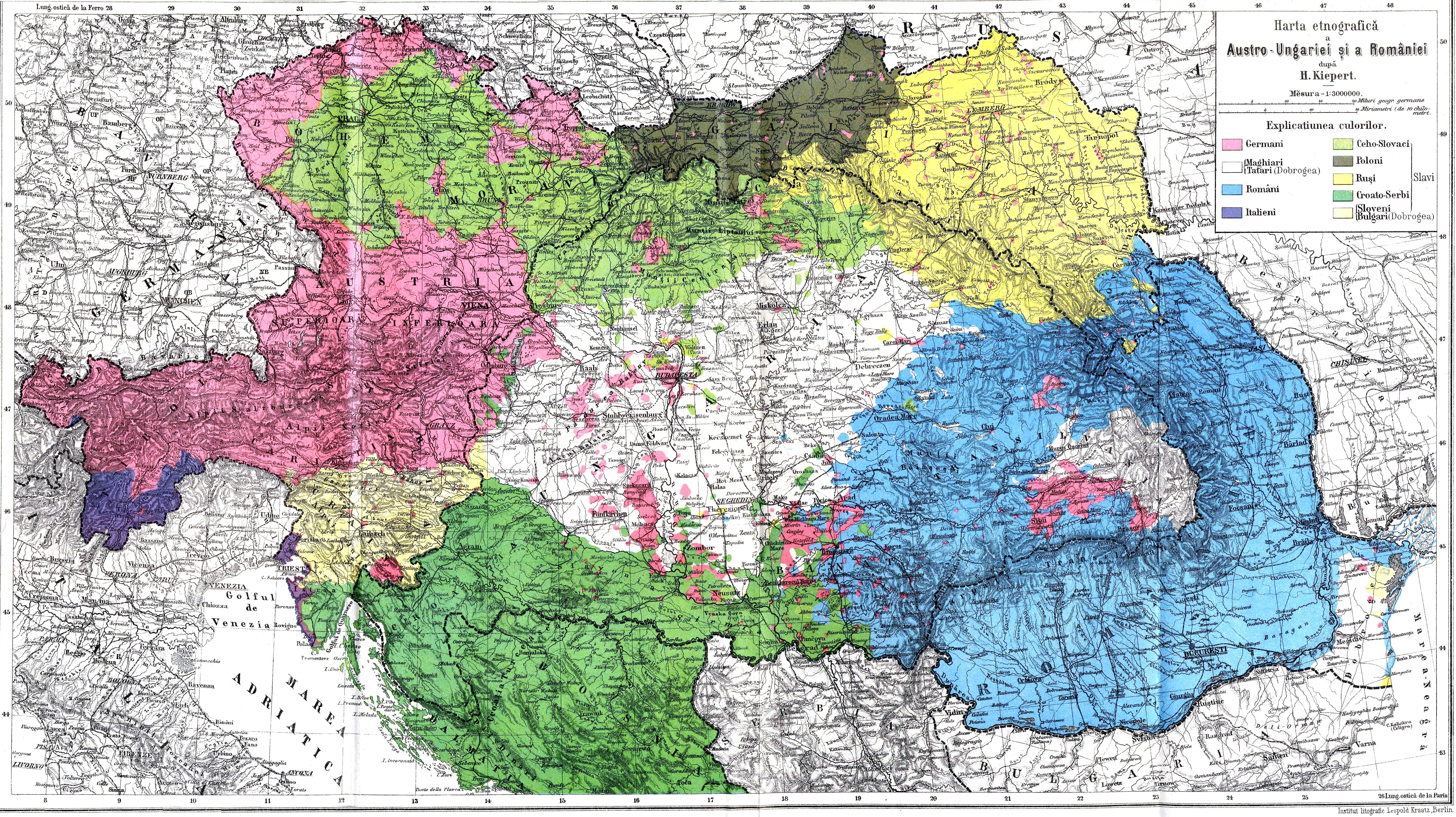
Ethnic map of Austria-Hungary and Romania, 1892

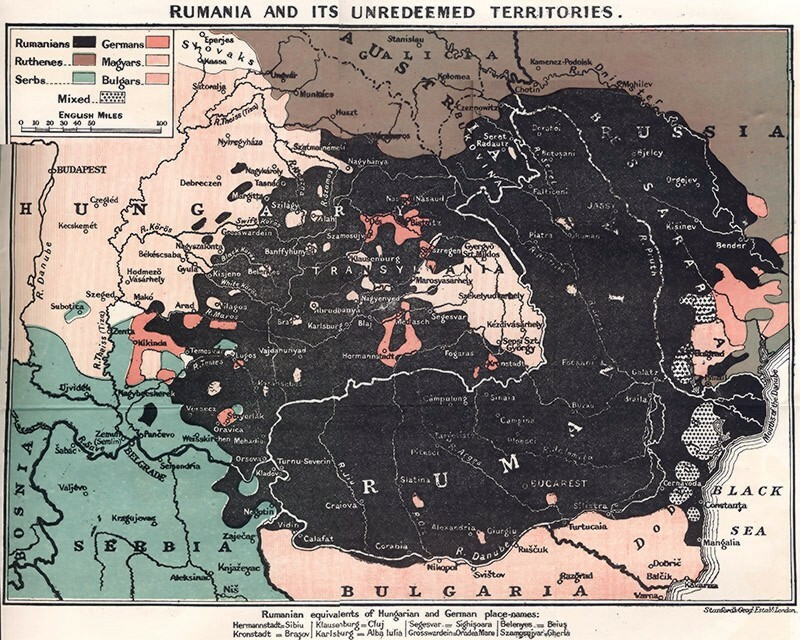
British map depicting territories inhabited by Eastern Romance peoples before the outbreak of World War I

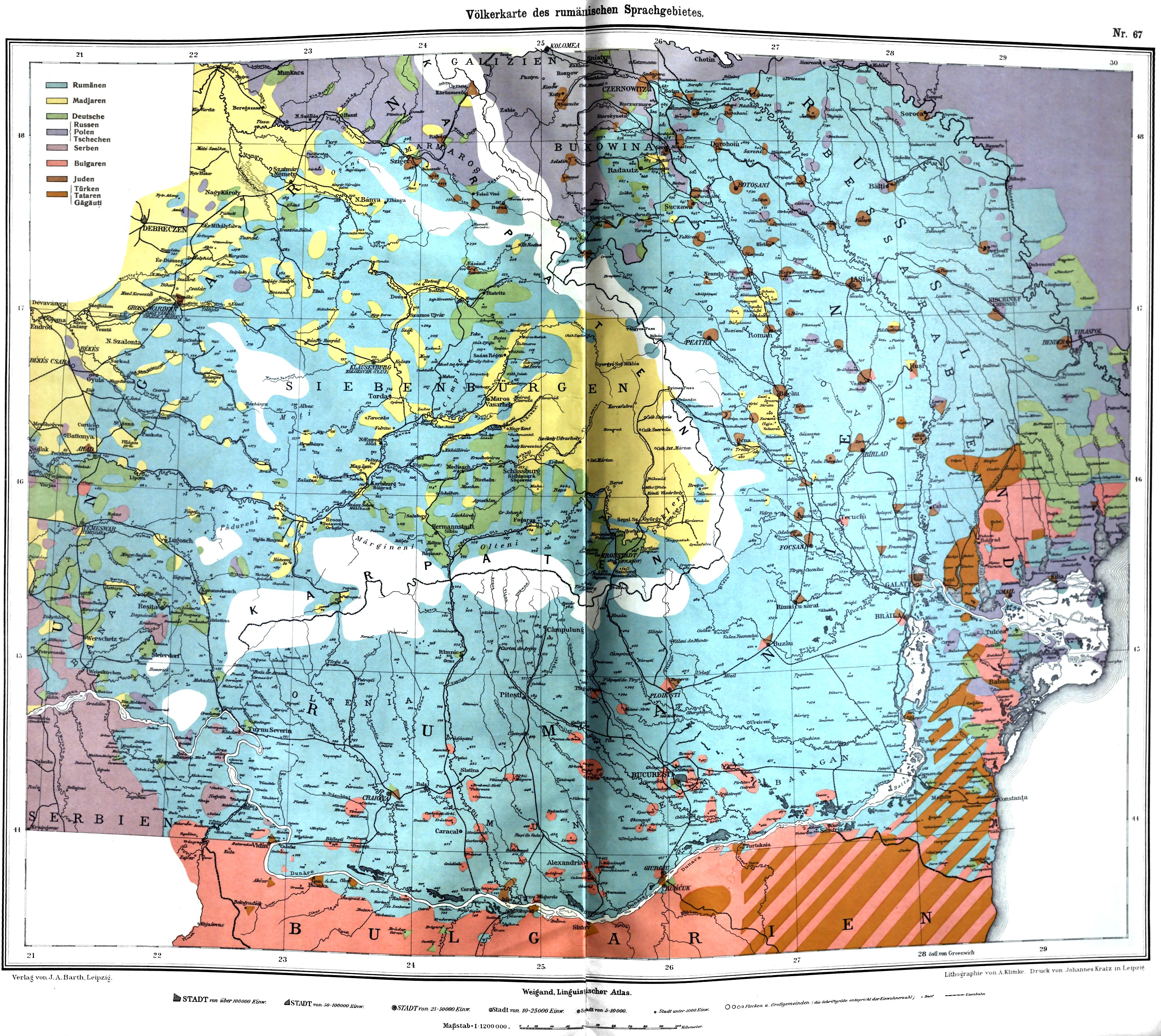
Romanian speakers in Central and Eastern Europe, early 20th century

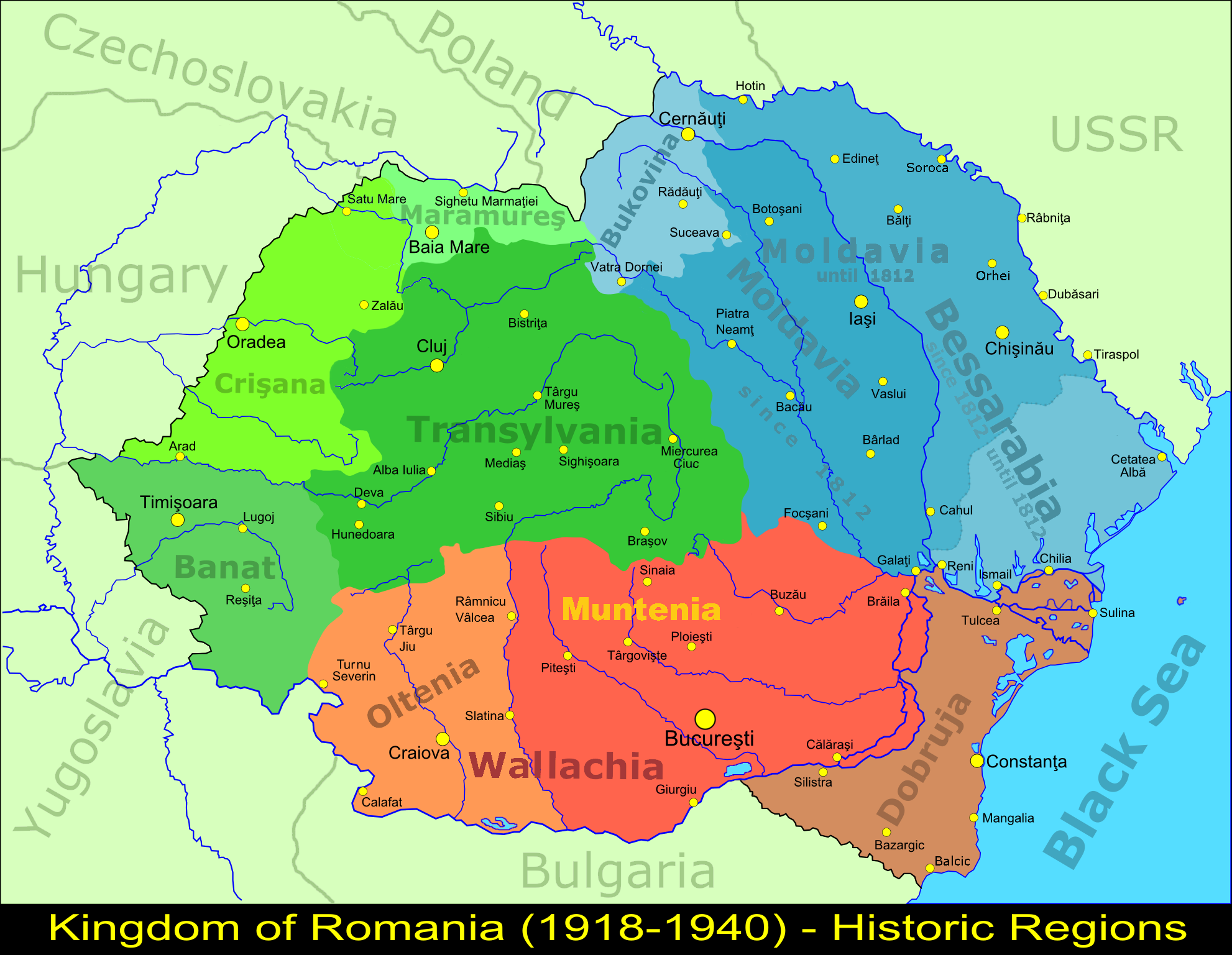
Map of the Kingdom of Romania at its greatest extent (1920–1940)

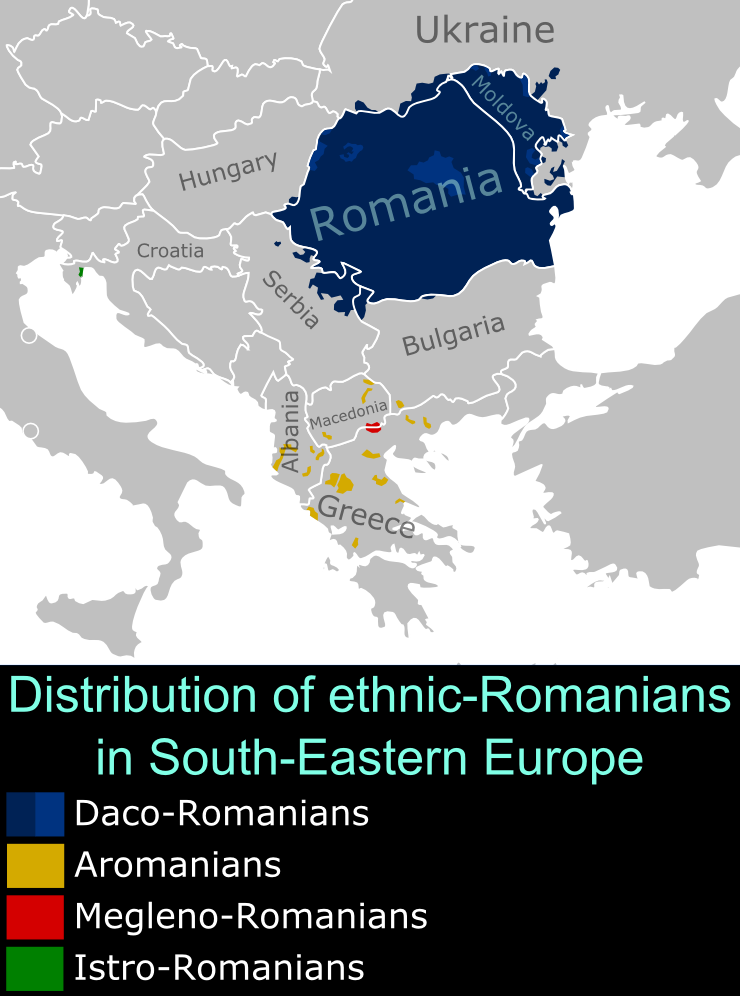
Geographic distribution of ethnic Romanians in the early 21st century

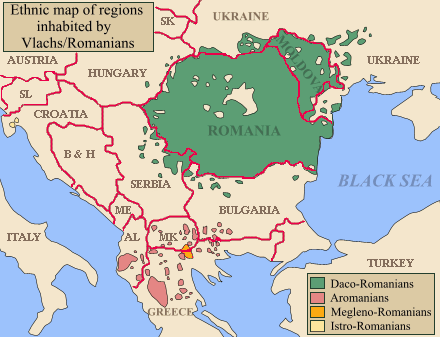
Notable regions with inhabited by Eastern Romance speakers at the beginning of the 21st century

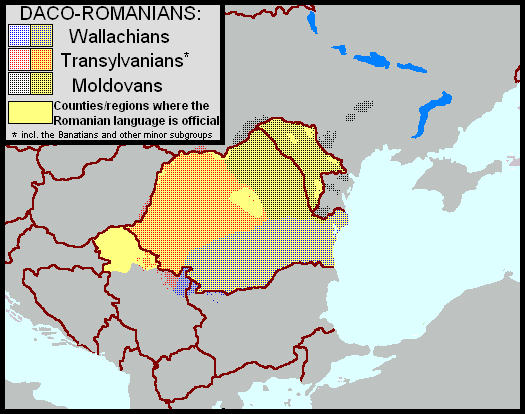
Map highlighting the three main sub-groups of Daco-Romanians

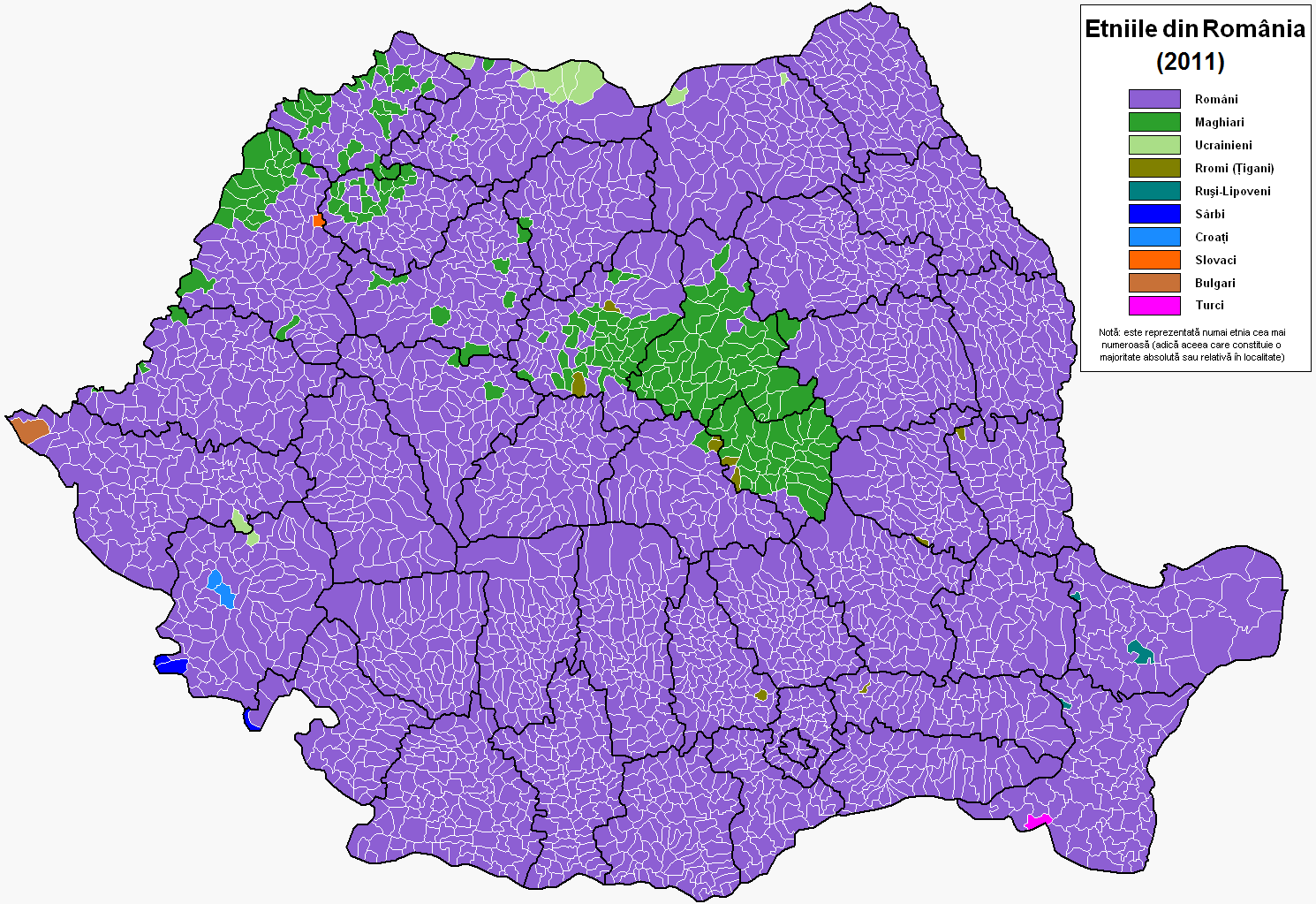
Geographic distribution of Romanians in Romania (coloured in purple) at commune level (2011 census)

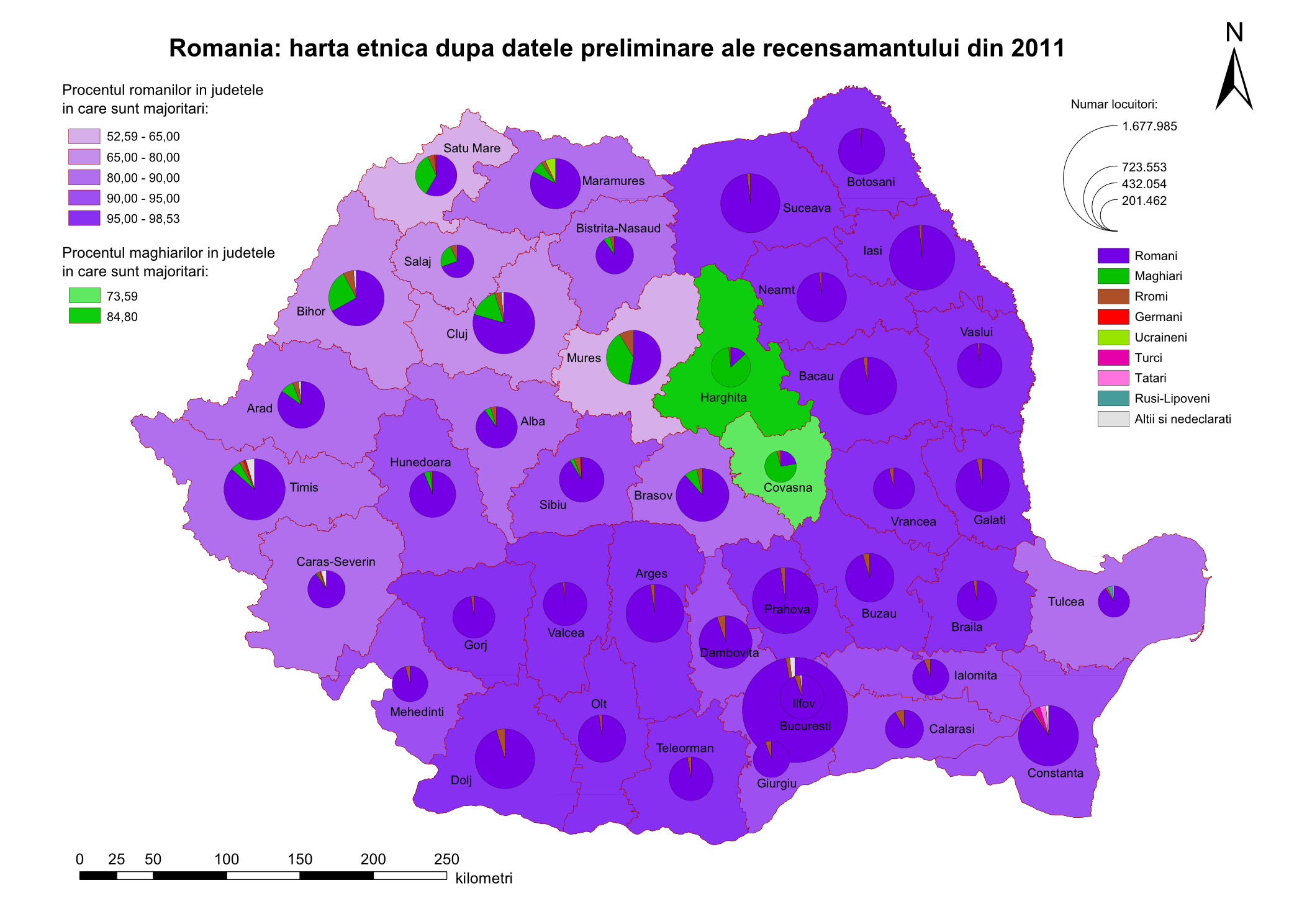
Geographic distribution of Romanian in Romania (coloured in purple) at county level (2011 census)

== See also ==
- List of notable Romanians
- List of Romanian inventors and discoverers
- Romance languages
- Slavic influence on Romanian
- Legacy of the Roman Empire
- Romanian diaspora
- Romanians in Germany
- Romanian British
- Romanian French
- Romanians of Italy
- Romanians of Spain
- Romanian Australians
- Romanian Americans
- Romanian Canadians
- Romanians of Serbia
- Romanian language in Serbia
- Romanians of Ukraine
- Romanians of Hungary
- Romanians of Bulgaria
- History of Romania
- Thraco-Roman
- Daco-Roman
- Brodnici
- Morlachs
- Gorals
- Moravian Wallachia
- Culture of Romania
- Art of Romania
- Geography of Romania
- Folklore of Romania
- Music of Romania
- Sport in Romania
- Name of Romania
- Romanian cuisine
- Romanian literature
- Minorities in Romania

== Bibliography ==
- Boia, Lucian (2001). History and Myth in Romanian Consciousness (Translated by James Christian Brown). CEU Press. ISBN 978-963-9116-96-2.
- Bóna, István (1994). "From Dacia to Transylvania: The Period of the Great Migrations (271–895); The Hungarian–Slav Period (895–1172)". In Köpeczi, Béla; Barta, Gábor; Bóna, István; Makkai, László; Szász, Zoltán; Borus, Judit (eds.). History of Transylvania. Akadémiai Kiadó. pp. 62–177. ISBN 963-05-6703-2.
- Curta, Florin (2001). The Making of the Slavs: History and Archaeology of the Lower Danube Region, c. 500–700. Cambridge: Cambridge University Press. ISBN 978-1-139-42888-0. Archived from the original on 27 September 2023.
- Curta, Florin (2006). Southeastern Europe in the Middle Ages, 500–1250. Cambridge: Cambridge University Press.
- Georgescu, Vlad (1991). The Romanians: a history. Columbus: Ohio State University Press. ISBN 978-0-8142-0511-2.
- Gyóni, Mátyás (1944). Elekes, Lajos (ed.). "A legrégibb vélemény a román nép eredetéről" [The oldest opinion about the origin of the Romanian people] (PDF). Századok (in Hungarian). 78. Budapest. Archived (PDF) from the original on 16 March 2023.
- Hind, J. G. F. (1984). "Whatever Happened to the 'Agri Decumates'?". Britannia. 15: 187–92. doi:10.2307/526591. JSTOR 526591. S2CID 163324047.
- Hitchins, Keith (2014). A Concise History of Romania. Cambridge University Press. ISBN 978-0-521-87238-6. Archived from the original on 30 April 2023.
- Janković, Đorđe (2004). "The Slavs in the 6th Century North Illyricum". Гласник Српског Археолошког Друштва. 20: 39–61. Archived from the original on 23 January 2013.
- Jones, C. P. (1988). "An Epigram from Ratiaria". The American Journal of Philology. 109 (2). Johns Hopkins University Press: 231–38. doi:10.2307/294583. JSTOR 294583.
- Kazhdan, Alexander, ed. (1991). The Oxford Dictionary of Byzantium. Oxford and New York: Oxford University Press. ISBN 0-19-504652-8.
- Madgearu, Alexandru (2001). "The Church Organization at the Lower Danube, between 971 and 2001". Études byzantines et post-byzantines. IV. Academia română: 71–85. ISSN 1222-4766. Archived from the original on 19 June 2022.
- Madgearu, Alexandru (2005). The Romanians in the Anonymous "Gesta Hungarorum": truth and fiction. Cluj-Napoca: Center for Transylvanian Studies, Romanian Cultural Institute. ISBN 973-7784-01-4.
- Pană Dindelegan, Gabriela (2013). "Introduction: Romanian – a brief presentation". In Pană Dindelegan, Gabriela (ed.). The Grammar of Romanian. Oxford University Press. pp. 1–7. ISBN 978-0-19-964492-6.
- Schramm, Gottfried (1997). Ein Damm bricht. Die römische Donaugrenze und die Invasionen des 5-7. Jahrhunderts in Lichte der Namen und Wörter [=A Dam Breaks: The Roman Danube frontier and the Invasions of the 5th-7th Centuries in the Light of Names and Words] (in German). R. Oldenbourg Verlag. ISBN 978-3-486-56262-0.
- Soulis, George C. (1963). "Thessalian Vlachia". Zbornik Radova Vizantološkog Instituta. 8 (1): 271–273.
- Spinei, Victor (2009). The Romanians and the Turkic nomads north of the Danube Delta from the tenth to the mid-thirteenth century. Leiden: Brill. ISBN 978-90-04-17536-5.
- Wiewiorowski, Jacek (2008). "Duces of Scythia Minor: A Prosopographical Study". Xenia Posnaniensia. VIII. Poznán. ISBN 978-83-60251-15-7. Archived from the original on 29 June 2023.
- Zahariade, Mihail (2006). Scythia Minor: A History of a Later Roman Province (284–681). Hakkert.
