= Istro-Romanians =

Ethnic group primarily living in Istria, Croatia

Istro-Romanians Rumeri, rumâri
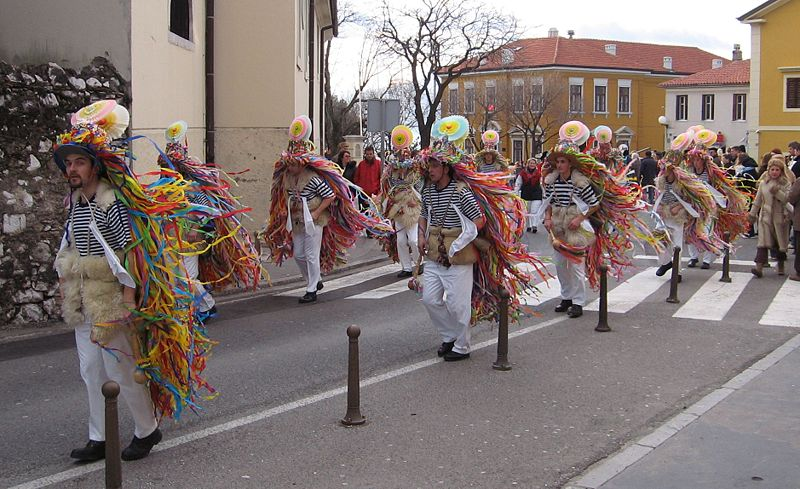
- Istro-Romanians from Žejane with their traditional zvončari costumes during the carnival in Rijeka, 2006

Total population
- c. 1,000

Regions with significant populations
- Istria c. 120
- Croatia: c. 450 (elsewhere)
- Rest of the world: c. 500

Languages
- Istro-Romanian, Croatian (Chakavian dialect), Italian

Religion
- Catholicism

Related ethnic groups
- Aromanians, Megleno-Romanians, Romanians

The Istro-Romanians (Istro Romanian: rumeri or rumâri) are a Romance ethnic group native to or associated with the Istrian Peninsula. Historically, they inhabited vast parts of it, as well as the western side of the island of Krk until 1875. However, due to several factors such as the industrialization and modernization of Istria during the socialist regime of Yugoslavia, many Istro-Romanians emigrated to other places, be they Croatian cities such as Pula and Rijeka or places such as New York City, Trieste and Western Australia. The Istro-Romanians dwindled severely in number, being reduced to eight settlements on the Croatian side of Istria in which they do not represent the majority.

It is known that the Istro-Romanians are not descendants of a historical Roman population native to Istria, since the differences between the Istro-Romanian language and the geographically close, now extinct Dalmatian language, are notable. Additionally, similarities to Transylvanian Romanians and Timok Vlachs suggest that Istro-Romanians may originate from areas west of Romania or Serbia. Although it is not known exactly how and when, the Istro-Romanians settled in Istria, where they would remain for centuries until they began to assimilate. Even now, with several associations and projects aiming to preserve their culture and with the support from both the Croatian and Romanian governments, the Istro-Romanians are not officially recognized as a national minority.

Although it has become widely popular and is now used almost exclusively, the term "Istro-Romanian" is a somewhat controversial scientific invention, which is not used by them to self-identify. The Istro-Romanians prefer to use names derived from their native villages, which are Jesenovik, Kostrčani, Letaj, Nova Vas, Šušnjevica, Zankovci, the Brdo area and the isolated Žejane. Others also use "Vlach", but to refer to the entire Istro-Romanian population, the names rumâri and rumeri are often employed. Their language is highly similar to Romanian, both being part of the Eastern Romance languages family alongside Aromanian and Megleno-Romanian, all descending from Proto-Romanian. However, Romania regards these ethnic groups as part of a "broad definition" of what a Romanian is, which is debatable and does not have a widely accepted view.

The Istro-Romanian culture has costumes, dances and songs with many similarities to those of Romania. Literature in Istro-Romanian is small, with the first book published in 1905. Historically, they were peasants and shepherds, with many of them being poor and without having received education until the 20th century. Today, the Istro-Romanian language has little use in education, media and religion, with Croatian imposing itself in these and other domains. They are so few that they have been described as "the smallest ethnolinguistic group in Europe". It is thought that if their situation does not change, the Istro-Romanians will disappear in the following decades.

== Names ==
=== Endonym ===
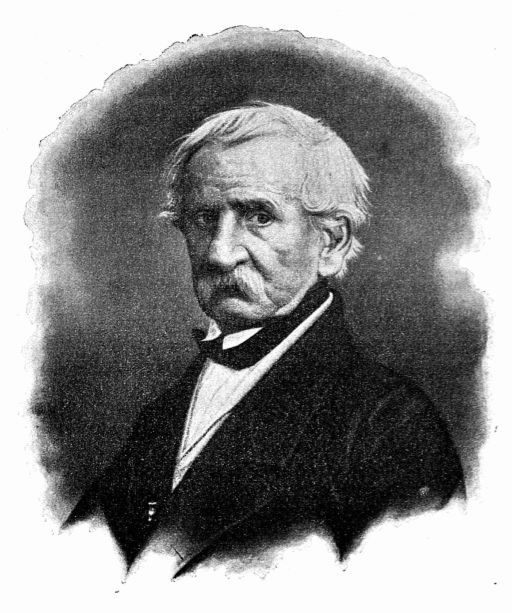
Gheorghe Asachi, the first person to use the name "Istro-Romanian"

The term "Istro-Romanian" is commonly used among researchers and linguists to identify this Eastern Romance people from the Istrian Peninsula. However, it is a relatively recent creation from the middle of the 19th century based on geographic rather than scientific criteria. This denomination was used for the first time by the Romanian writer and historian Gheorghe Asachi (as istroromâni), and then by the Slovene philologist Franz Miklosich, (as istrischen Rumunen and istro-rumunisch), from which the name of the Istro-Romanian language and its speakers would be generalized. Nowadays, it is almost exclusively employed, and highlights the similarity of this language with the Romanian one. However, the Istro-Romanians do not identify with this name, and the use of "Istro-Romanian" outside the context of linguistics can be controversial until a certain point. Some people use the more recent name "Vlashki and Zheyanski language".

To refer to themselves as a whole, the Istro-Romanians may use rumâri, derived from the Latin romanus. The similar rumeri is also used since the 17th century, but this endonym (internal name, used by the ethnic group in question) does not appear in documents until its reuse by the Istro-Romanian writer and professor Andrei Glavina and the Romanian historian Constantin Diculescu and then by the Romanian journalist and professor Alexandru Leca Morariu in the 20th century. Due to the influence of Romanian researchers, Istro-Romanians also use the Croatian word rumunji, especially in contact with foreigners. Given the weakness of Istro-Romanian national sentiment, some elder people call themselves Romanians or Romanian-speaking Croats or even Italians (except in Žejane) to differentiate themselves from the surrounding Croats.

Many Istro-Romanians prefer to use a demonym derived from the name of their native village. For example, those from Šušnjevica use șușnevți and șușnevski or šušnjevski for their language, those from Nova Vas use novosani and novosanski or novošånski for their language, those from Kostrčani use costărčånți and those from the Brdo area use brijånski for their language. Generally, the Istro-Romanians from the villages south of the Učka mountain range also use the name vlåš (singular vlåh) and vlaška or vlaški for their language, taken from the South Slavic word "Vlach". On the other hand, in the northern village of Žejane, the only other one in which Istro-Romanian is spoken, jeianți or žejånci is used for the people and jeianski, žejanski or po jeianski cuvinta for the language. Croats also call them jeianci or vlaski, but the inhabitants of Žejane do not identify as Vlachs.

=== Exonym ===
The Istro-Romanians have been called in many ways by the peoples that lived alongside them or in their surroundings. One of the earliest exonyms (external names) used for Istro-Romanians is Ćići, given by the Croats. It appears in Latin documents in the form of chichii, in Italian ones first in the form of chichi and later as cici or cicci, and in German ones as tschizen, tschitzen, zitschen, tschitschen, ziegen and zische.

There exist several theories on its etymological origin. It has been suggested that it could come from the Italian word cicaleccio, derived from the verb cicalare, meaning "insistent and confused (indistinct) talking", since Slavs could not understand the Istro-Romanians. The Croatian linguist Petar Šimunović similarly proposed as the possible origin the Croatian verb variations čičerati or čičarati, čačarat and k'ik'rat, all of which mean "speak". The Croatian linguist Josip Ribarić noted that Croats in Istria meant "speaking Istro-Romanian" when using the term čičerati, and the term drakulati (from draku, "dragon", "devil") was used in the villages of Male Mune and Vele Mune for the Istro-Romanian speech of Žejane. Šimunović also proposed the interrogative pronoun ći in the meaning "what?", while Ribarić proposed that the syllable či appeared in all the mentioned words that the Romance-speaking Vlachs often used and was unusual to the Slavs. In Istro-Romanian, as a result of secondary palatalization, t becomes ț ("c") in Šušnjevica and č in Nova Vas and Žejane, hence the term cincari or tsinstari could come from Vulgar Latin tsintsi (compare to Megleno-Romanian ținți), meaning "five" and deriving as tsintsi-ținți-cinci-činči-(n)-čiči-ćići. The also proposed derivation from the Slavic word čičā ("old man", "uncle") is improbable.

Today, the ethnonym (name given to an ethnic group, be it internal or external) Ćići is imprecise, because it also refers to the Croats and Slovenes of the region of Ćićarija. Another name used by the Croats is Ćiribirci, believed to come from Istro-Romanian words čire (lat. qui ne, ține-cine-țire-cire-čire, who/you) and bire from bine (lat. bene, good), meaning a greeting "hold well". Since it is usually said as a joke, it may be offensive for some native speakers. Those of the island of Krk were often called by the local Croats as "Vlachs", commonly in negative context.

Another name is "Vlach" (from Greek βλάχοι, in Latin documents vlachi, in Croatian and Serbian vlahi, later vlasi), used for the Istro-Romanians (including those in Krk) since the Middle Ages, but it has different meanings depending on the persons that used or use it and depending on the epoch. The Byzantines used it for all the Romance-speaking peoples in the Balkans, but in Croatian and Serbian documents it designated shepherds of any ethnicity from the territories inhabited by South Slavs. Today, in Greek, the term also denotes the Aromanians and the Megleno-Romanians, and in Serbian and Bulgarian, the Timok Vlachs. The term "Morlach" (in Greek μαυρόβλαχοι, in Latin moroulahi, in Croatian morlaci, in Italian morlacchi) was originally used for all the Western Vlachs, from which the Istro-Romanians may originate, but it also designated shepherds of other ethnicities, and is no longer used at present. More names have been used in the academic community for the Istro-Romanians. The erudite scientist Antonio Covaz called them rimgliani or vlahi d'Istria, rimljani being the term used by Croats and Serbs for Roman citizens.

== History ==
=== Origins and arrival ===
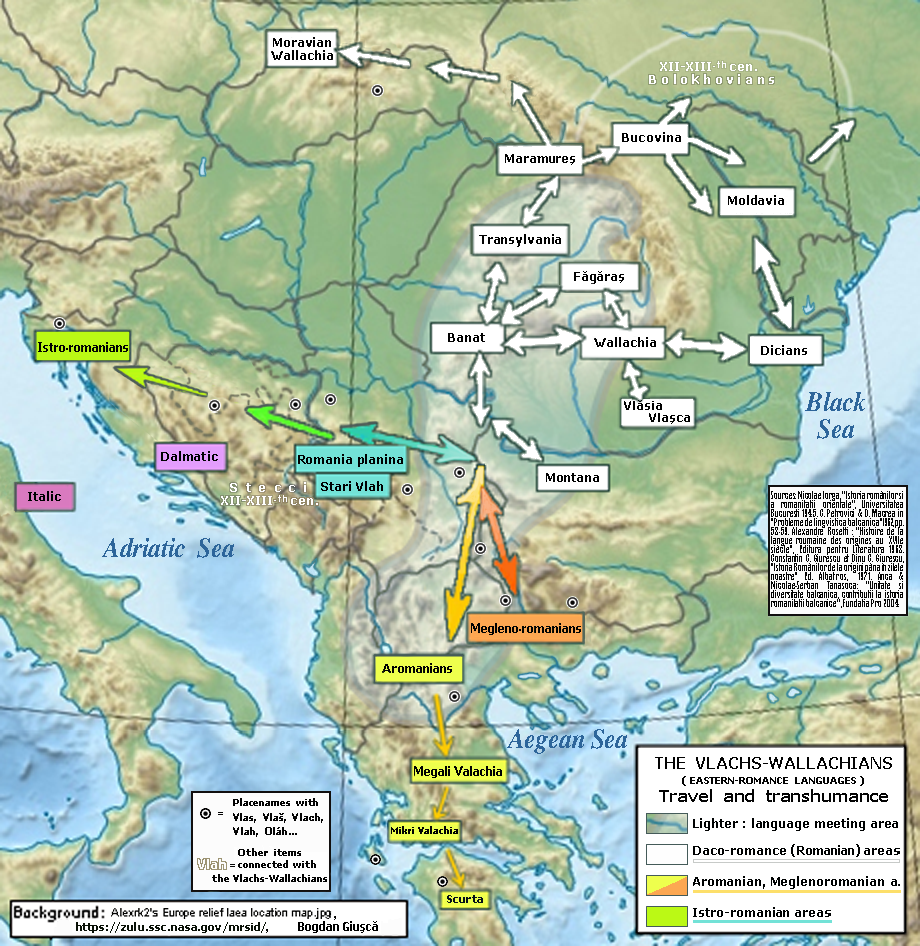
Map showing the migrations of the Eastern Romance peoples, including a route with which the Istro-Romanians could have settled in Istria

The first mention of a Romance-speaking population in Istria during the Middle Ages dates back to 940 when the Byzantine emperor Constantine VII reported in his De Administrando Imperio that there were Romance peoples in the peninsula which called themselves Romans although they did not come from Rome. Theories about the Istro-Romanians descending from a historical Roman population in Istria were initially supported by Italian and some Romanian researchers. However, this point of view is now refuted due to the similarities of the Istro-Romanians with the Romanians from the west of Romania and the Timok Valley and the differences with the geographically close Dalmatian language (now extinct).

Two other dominant theories are distinguished. According to the theory of the Romanian philologist and linguist Ovid Densusianu, the Istro-Romanians originate from the southwest of Transylvania and Banat, and would have emigrated from there between the years 1000 and 1400. He bases this theory on language traits, for example, the simple intervocalic rhotacism (sound change that converts one consonant into a "R-like" sound) of [n] ([n]> [r]) in the words of Latin origin, as in the Țara Moților dialect in Romania. In addition, there are Istro-Romanian popular stories about their arrival in Istria during the Middle Ages. According to local legends, there were seven caravans that came from Transylvania and settled in Istria, six south of the Učka and one north of it. This theory is also embraced by other scholars like Vasile Frățilă, Iosif Popovici and Goran Filipi. Other authors say that the Istro-Romanians migrated much earlier, in the second half of the first millennium, before the start of the Hungarian influence on Romanian, since the Istro-Romanian language does not have these influences.

Another theory, that of Romanian linguist and philologist Sextil Pușcariu, claimed a south Danubian origin for the Istro-Romanians, specifically in current Serbia, but with contact with the Romanians at the west of Romania. He placed their separation from the other Eastern Romance peoples in the 13th century. With distinctions as to the exact location, Pușcariu's theory is also adopted by several scholars. There is also an intermediate theory belonging to Elena Scărlătoiu suggesting that the "great mass of Istro-Romanians" came from several nuclei in the center, west and northwest of Transylvania, as well as from the south of the Danube, namely, the area between the Timok Valley and Prizren.

However, none of these hypotheses is universally accepted by the scientific community and therefore the question about the provenience of this people remains uncertain. Regardless of the place of origin, the Istro-Romanians are usually considered to be the last Eastern Romance people to break away from the others and migrate to the west, mainly becoming shepherds. Giuseppe Vassilich (1900) and Sextil Pușcariu (1926) considered that the Istro-Romanians were attested in old Byzantine documents under the name "Morlachs" (in Greek μαυρόβλαχοι). Pușcariu argued that the attestation of the names "Danulus" and "Negulus" in documents from 1018 and 1070 respectively indicated that the Istro-Romanians had possibly arrived to Dalmatia as early as the 11th century, a theory for which Ion Șiadbei believed there was not enough evidence.

=== Late Middle Ages and further ===
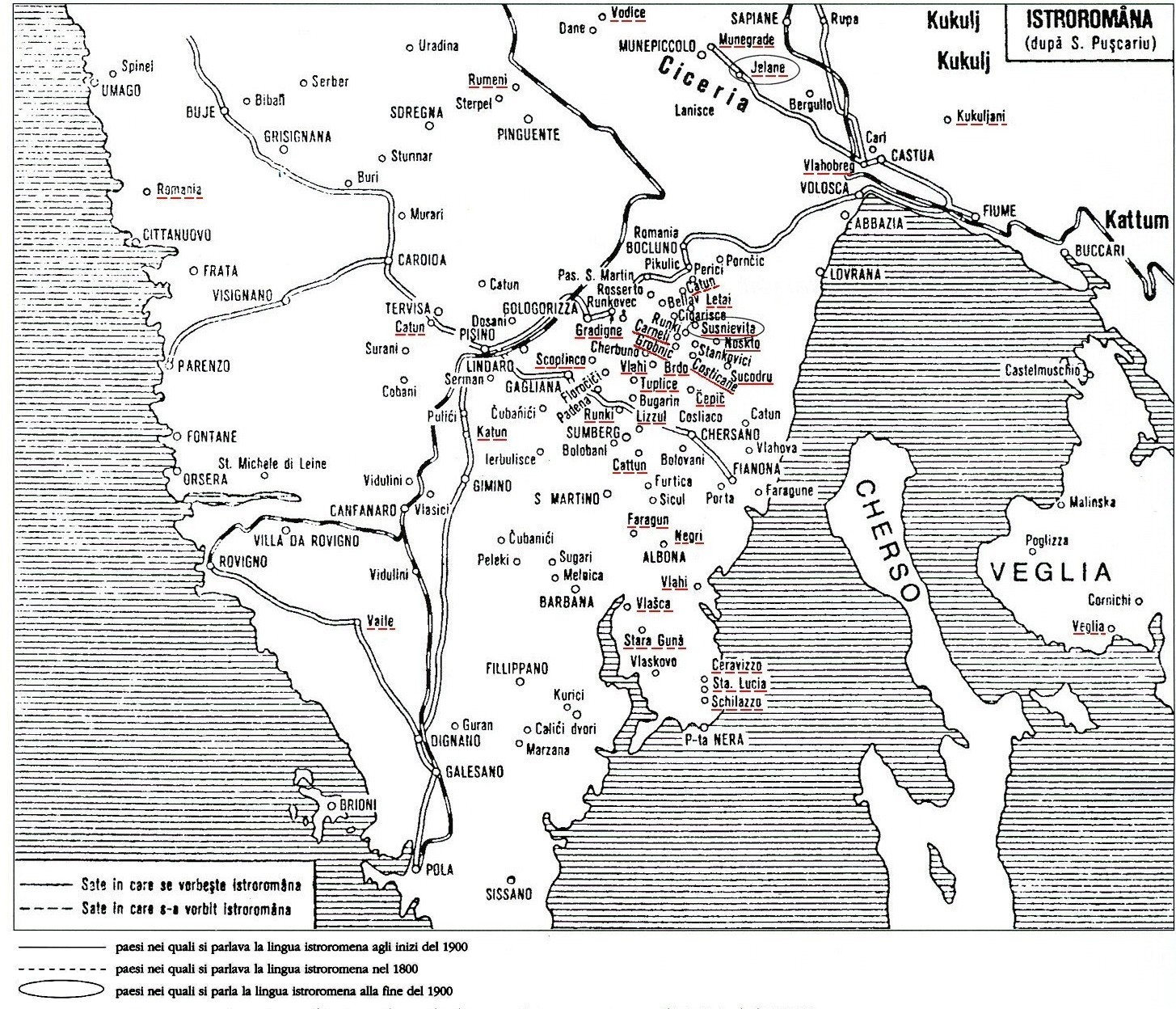
Historical distribution of the Istro-Romanians throughout Istria, western Krk and Croatia proper (Kukuljani), based on toponymy and according to Sextil Pușcariu (1926)

During the following centuries, people of possible Istro-Romanian ethnicity in and around Istria will continue to be mentioned. In 1181, an abbess of the Patriarchate of Aquileia named Ermelinda reported the appearance of a person named Radul (considered a Romanian name by some) to whom lands have been attributed in what is now the Italian province of Friuli-Venezia Giulia.

In the 14th century, Vlach shepherds are attested near the cities of Split, Trogir, Šibenik and Zadar, as well as in the islands of Rab, Pag and Krk. In a document of 1329 referring to Buzet in Istria, the name of one Vlach appears; Pasculus Chichio, a name derived from the exonym "Ćići" used by Croats for Istro-Romanians. It is known that during this century the Istro-Romanians used caravans to sell their dairy products and transport other goods. In the Ragusan trade, caseus vlachescus or vlachiscus (brença, cheese, as it appears in a document from 1357) was of such importance that it was also used as a payment method, and its price was set by the authorities. They also traded with salt on the Adriatic coast.

In the 15th century, there were epidemics of devastating plague in Istria, and the Senate of the Republic of Venice, ruler of the peninsula, favored the settlement of Morlachs, as well South Slavs who escaped from the Ottoman Empire. Due to this, in 1449, Vlachs are mentioned in the Istrian town of Buje. The word cici first appeared as a proper ethnonym in a document of 1463.

In addition, the governor of the island of Krk since 1451, Ivan VII Frankopan, was in need of manpower. Therefore, during the second half of the 15th century, he started to settle the less populated or uninhabited parts, such as the western zone of the island, that is, in and around the areas of Dubašnica and Poljica and in the land between the castles of Dobrinj and Omišalj. Most of the settlers were Vlachs and Morlachs, who came from the south of the Velebit mountain range and around the Dinara mountain. The Croatian linguist and onomastics expert Petar Skok affirms that this people was composed of Romanian shepherds, as they preserved Romanian numbering until the 20th century. They crossed the Velebit Channel, in Italian, Canale della Morlacca ("Channel of the Morlach"), and settled in western Krk. Today, there are some toponyms such as Fȁreča (from Romanian ferece, fern), Fintȉra (from Romanian fîntînă, fountain) and Sekara (from Romanian secară, ryn) left in Krk. It is also known that the current Croatian dialect of Krk has a few Istro-Romanian loans, like špilišôr or špirišôr (from Romanian spin, "spine", + the suffix șor), a common name for the plant Sonchus whose leaves have small spines. It is thought that some of these Vlachs and Morlachs continued their way to Istria, where they settled, but like the other theories, this cannot be confirmed.

By the year 1523, the Istro-Romanians were already referred to as cicerani or ciceliani by the Italian and Austrian chancelleries. Carsia, the former name of the region in which Žejane is located, was changed to Cicceria (now Ćićarija). In this century, based on toponymy, they were spread almost everywhere inside the peninsula according to Sextil Pușcariu, especially in the areas of Žejane, Male Mune and Vele Mune, north of the Učka, as well as in Šušnjevica and other villages at the south of the mountain range, populating more than thirty settlements of varying sizes between 1510 and 1599. In a 1641 work about Istria, the scholar and bishop of Cittanova (now Novigrad) Giacomo Filippo Tomasini mentions the name morlaci, claiming that "they have their own language, which is in many words similar to Latin".

During the 16th century, some Croatian writers saw the Istrian Vlachs as part of the same ethnic group as the Romanians from Trajanic Dacia, and considered Dacia as the "Morovlasca Zemlja" ("Morlach Country"). Also, the Italian monk Ireneo della Croce, in a work of Trieste of 1698, mentions people who, instead of using a Slavic language, speak a language composed of many Latin words that is similar to the Wallachian one. Later, he says that the chichi call themselves in their own language as rumeri. This word reflects the phonetic changes produced in the evolution from Latin to the Eastern Romance languages in general ([o] not accentuated > [u], [a] accentuated followed by [n] + vowel > [ɨ], represented in Italian as [e]) and one specific to Istro-Romanian: [n] simple intervocalic > [r]. He also gave thirteen single nouns (like copra, goat, or lapte, milk), eight nouns with determiners and two sentences from their language with the Italian translation. This is the first attestation of the language apart from toponyms and person names, which had previously appeared in writings. It is assumed that during this time, the Istro-Romanians already extended to Trieste.

=== Assimilation and Austro-Hungarian rule ===
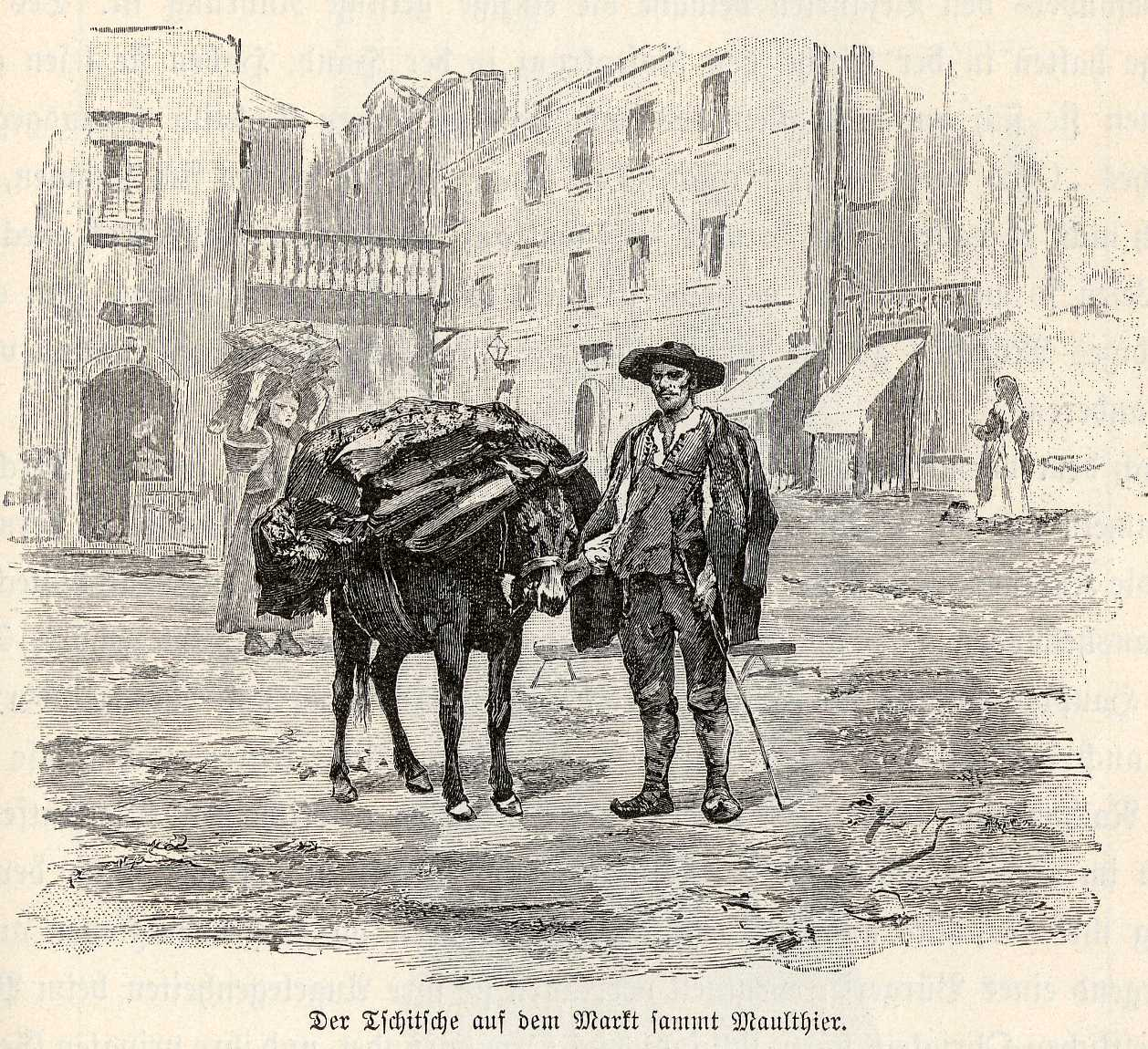
Istro-Romanian at the end of the 19th century

During the 17th and 18th centuries, the Istro-Romanian population would begin to fall under the assimilation of the local population, only preserving its identity and language in the most densely populated settlements such as Žejane and the villages south of the Učka. The only thing left of the smallest settlements in the Croatian and Slovenian region of Ćićarija and the rest of Istria is the toponomy of the places, which proves that at some point, the Istro-Romanians were more widespread. Examples are Bolovani, Catun, Carbune, Floričići, Murari and Vlahi. Unlike the other Romance peoples such as the Romanians or the Aromanians, the Istro-Romanians did not suffer a national renaissance, probably due to the small size of their population and the influence of assimilation factors. It would not be until the time of the Revolutions of 1848 when Romanians from the two principalities (Wallachia and Moldavia) "discovered" this population in Istria. This would start a period of interest among Romanians to study and contact the Istro-Romanians. During this period, their population is estimated at 6,000.

Towards the end of the 19th century, Istria was part of the Austro-Hungarian Empire, of the Austrian Littoral crown land, and was inhabited by several ethnic groups, mainly Croats and Italians. The Istro-Romanians were not recognized as a national minority unlike other peoples. Actually, researchers of the time point the discrimination they suffer. The German linguist Gustav Weigand mentions that their schoolarization is very poor. Both Croats and Italians seek to assimilate them, and as a result, in the Istro-Romanian villages there are no schools in the Croatian or Italian languages, and even less in Istro-Romanian. Weigand's statement is partly contradicted by the fact that the Italians supported this demand, but they were less numerous than the Croats. Various authors mention that church services were given in Latin and Croatian, with priests striving to hinder the cultural development of the parishioners. It is estimated that between 1850 and 1859, there were 2,955 Istro-Romanians. Meanwhile, the Istro-Romanians of Krk had been suffering severe assimilation since long before and many of them abandoned their language. They disappeared completely in 1875 when Mate Bajčić Gašpović from Bajčići (near Poljica), the last person with knowledge of Istro-Romanian on the island, died.

During this period, the Romanian media provoked activity in the area. In the newspaper Giovine pensiero of 27 October 1887, there was a request signed by many Istro-Romanians to establish a school teaching in the Romanian language. This was discussed in the autumn of 1888 in the Diet of Istria. The Croatian representative impugned the existence of the Istro-Romanians and tried to prove that they were Slavs. Although the subsequent proposals had the support of several Italian deputies, the Croatian majority rejected all of them. In 1905, a school teaching in Croatian was established, with little popularity among students despite the efforts of the priest of Šušnjevica. The Romanian ethnographer and folklorist Teodor Burada found in 1896 that poverty was high among Istro-Romanians during this time: pastoralism had fallen, zootechnics were neglected and agriculture was poorly productive. They started to cultivate vineyards, but they were destroyed by the grape phylloxera bug. A way to increase their income through the work in the soil was the cultivation of culinary sage, especially in Šušnjevica. The population of Istro-Romanians between 1880 and 1884 was composed by around 2,600 people.

=== Italian annexation and interwar period ===
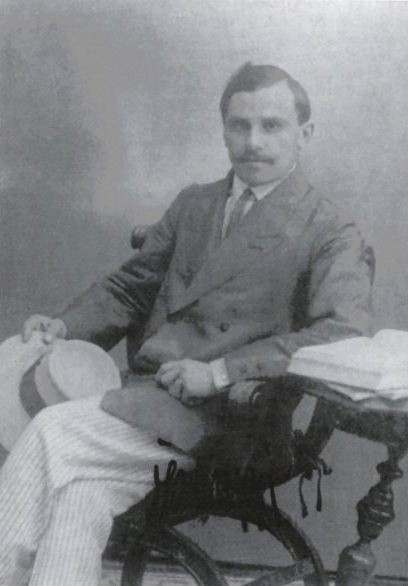
Andrei Glavina, "Apostle of the Istro-Romanians", in 1920

At the beginning of the 20th century, the Istro-Romanian from Šušnjevica Andrei Glavina returned to Istria from Romania (where he studied at the Alexandru Ioan Cuza University of Iași) to awaken the identity of his people. This person is known for writing the first work entirely in Istro-Romanian in collaboration with Diculescu, Calindaru lu rumeri din Istrie (Calendar of the Romanians of Istria), published in 1905. During the first years of the century, he promoted campaigns in newspapers and tried to contact with deputies of Austria-Hungary, without success due to the Croatian pressure. Nevertheless, after the First World War, Istria was annexed to the Kingdom of Italy. Glavina made the same request again, which was accepted immediately. Glavina became leader of the school of Frascati-Susgnevizza (Šušnjevica), which was named Împăratul Traian (in Romanian, "Emperor Trajan") and became very popular, reaching 443 students at its peak. The textbooks were in Romanian and Italian, but the classes were taught in the local language. He also became mayor of the municipality of Valdarsa (an Italian name for Šušnjevica), a municipality created to unify all the Istro-Romanian villages south of the Učka, with 2,301 inhabitants during its establishment. He improved the economic conditions of the villages and worked on their infrastructure. Glavina died in 1925 from tuberculosis, which led to the closure of the school and its replacement by an Italian one. Due to his efforts for the preservation of the language and culture of the Istro-Romanians, Glavina is known as the "Apostle of the Istro-Romanians". Four years before his death, an Italian official census registered 1,644 ethnic Istro-Romanians in Istria.

The municipality of Valdarsa continued to exist until 1947, Glavina being succeeded as mayor by Francesco Bellulovich, also from Šušnjevica. The interest and research on the part of Italian and Romanian academics continued. It is remarkable the work of Sextil Pușcariu, who published three volumes of his studies on the Istro-Romanians in 1906, 1926 and 1929, respectively. Morariu published in 1928 the second book in Istro-Romanian, Lu frati noștri: libru lu rumeri din Istrie (To our brothers: book of the Romanians of Istria). In 1932, Italy completed the recovery of the Arsa River (now Raša River) basin, a project that dates back to 1771, previously proposed by the Republic of Venice and the Austrian Empire. This improved the quality of life of the locals, but also caused certain immigrationist phenomena. There even was a project led by the Romanian academic Sever Pop in which he would take two Istro-Romanian children (one from Šušnjevica and one from Žejane) to Romania to educate them there (as happened with Glavina), with the aim of opening new Romanian schools in both villages. In 1934, a road was established connecting the municipality with Fiume (now Rijeka), and another one with Pisino (now Pazin) in 1941, thus reducing the isolation of the villages. The majority of the population was peasant, although there were also some sailors on the river. The last mayor of Valdarsa was Guglielmo Barchiesi.

=== Second World War and postwar period ===
Italy during the Italian Civil War, with partisans marked in Istria

It is known that during Second World War, the Istro-Romanians did not support the Italian expansion over Croatia and Slovenia. Žejane was later occupied by German-Italian forces on 5 May 1944, burning a large number of houses and farms. There, a concentration camp was established. In the Istro-Romanian villages, houses and especially churches were destroyed during the last phase of the Second World War by the Nazis as a reprisal for the actions of the Partisans. However, Italy's defeat resulted in most of Istria being passed to the new socialist Yugoslavia. Between 1945 and 1956, the Istrian-Dalmatian exodus occurred in which around 250,000 Italians were expelled from Istria, Dalmatia and Fiume. In the Istrian inland, Italians suffered mass killings (known as foibe massacres), property confiscations and hard forced labour. This greatly reduced the Romance-speaking population of Istria. After the establishment of the socialist regimes in Romania and Yugoslavia, the efforts, projects and support for the preservation of the Istro-Romanian culture were branded as fascist and were canceled.

Immediately after the end of the war, the villages and Istria in general began to depopulate quickly. This may be due to the political and social changes that came when it united with other Croatian-speaking lands and the Yugoslav socialist regime, as well as the industrialization, modernization and urbanization of the place. The young villagers started to prefer industrial and service jobs, leaving the agricultural lifestyle of the villages. In addition, interethnic marriage became more common both for those who abandoned their hometowns and those who decided to stay. Regular and universal education and media in Croatian commenced to spread, and the Istro-Romanian language lost value. Barely 8 years after the Second World War, the villages had already lost more than a quarter of their population. Some Istro-Romanians also began to leave Istria completely and emigrate to other countries such as Australia, the United States, Canada, France and Italy (especially Trieste), a sizeable amount estimated to be composed by 500 people since 1945. Although weaker, interest in the Istro-Romanians continued after the war, now with Croats (like the linguist August Kovačec) studying them as well. Not much else is known about the life of the Istro-Romanians during this time since they only appeared in mainly linguistic articles, with practically no news about them. In 1961, there were approximately 1,140 Istro-Romanians (understanding by people with Istro-Romanian ancestry or able to speak their language) in Istria, and 1,250 in 1974.

=== Present ===
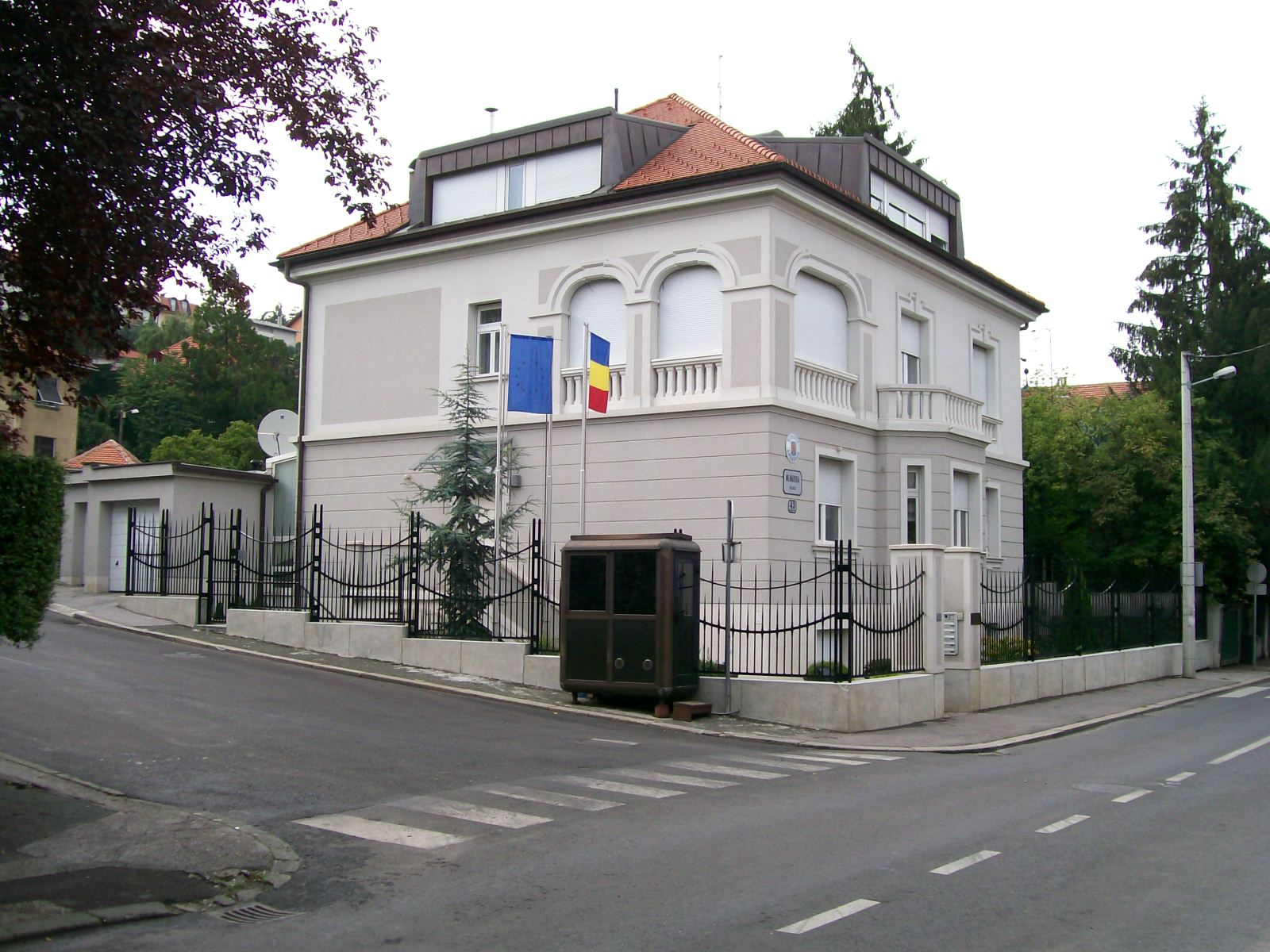
The Romanian embassy in Zagreb

In 1991, Croatia declared independence, inheriting most of Istria from Yugoslavia. In this year, there were 810 people self-declared as Istro-Romanians and 22 as Morlachs in Istria. After the fall of socialism, the press of Romania and other countries would begin to give more importance to the Istro-Romanian community. The Croatian authorities also started to show more interest in them, with the Croatian state itself promising to do everything possible to preserve this ethnic group. The Istro-Romanian culture would begin to undergo a "revival", with a great number of associations and projects being created. On 19 April 1994, the Cultural Association of the Istro-Romanians "Andrei Glavina" was created in Trieste with the purpose of saving and preserving the Istro-Romanians, with Emil Petru Rațiu as president. Another association, Soboru lu Istrorumeri (In Istro-Romanian, "Union of the Istro-Romanians"), appeared in 1995. The first newspaper in Istro-Romanian, Scrisoare către fråț rumer (in Istro-Romanian, "Letter to the Romanian brothers"), came out in 1996 and contains fiction (original or translated from Romanian), notes on their history and ethnicity and news about the Aromanians and their life, among others. In 1997, the Congress of the Federal Union of European Nationalities adopted a resolution appealing Croatia to officially recognize the Istro-Romanians and the use of their language in education, media and religion.

The Istro-Romanian diaspora, notably that of Canada and the United States, has also been putting its efforts to help the community in Istria. For example, the reparation and renovation of the clock tower of the hamlet of Brdo, as well as the construction of a museum about the Istro-Romanian culture in Žejane, were carried out with its funds. There are also several websites presenting the culture and history of the Istro-Romanians, notably Marisa Ciceran's (part of the diaspora), created in 1999. On 27 September 2007, the Ministry of Culture of Croatia gave to the Istro-Romanian language the status of "non-material cultural wealth" and registered it in the Register of Cultural Goods of Croatia. In 2008, the Moldovan politician Vlad Cubreacov initiated a draft resolution presented in Strasbourg called "Istro-Romanians must be saved", in which he urges Croatia and Romania to give more financial and institutional support. On 8 November 2016, the Šušnjevica school was reopened. The inauguration was attended by Constantin Mihail Grigorie, then ambassador of Romania in Croatia, and the previous one, Cosmin Dinescu. Regional authorities of the Istria County also stayed there. This project cost 451,600 kunas (around 61,100 euros), of which Romania gave 100,000 kunas (around 13,550 euros). The school teaches in Istro-Romanian and has a museum, "The Paths of the Vlachs". It was estimated that in 2016, there were only 120 speakers of Istro-Romanian in their villages, 450 speakers elsewhere in Croatia and another 500 in the rest of the world. Therefore, the diaspora is larger than the native Istrian community.

Currently, there is a website dedicated to the digital archiving of photos, maps, books, articles, songs and audio and video recordings regarding the Istro-Romanians and their life. It also includes a Croatian–Istro-Romanian dictionary. The website is called "Preservation of the Vlaški and Žejanski Language", and is led by the Croatian linguist and professor Zvjezdana Vrzić. Romania officially supports the rights of what it calls "Romanians abroad", referring to all those who "assume a Romanian cultural identity, people of Romanian origin and persons that belong to the Romanian linguistic and cultural vein, Romanians who live outside Romania, regardless how they are called". This legislation includes not only the Istro-Romanians, but also the Aromanians, Megleno-Romanians, Moldovans, Vlachs and many others; all seen as ethnic Romanians by the Romanian state. Based on this, in 2021, the Balkan Romanianness Day was approved as a holiday in the country for the purportedly ethnic Romanian peoples living south of the Danube. This includes the Aromanians, the Megleno-Romanians and the Istro-Romanians. It celebrates the establishment of the Ullah millet in the Ottoman Empire in 1905 every 10 May.

Today, the Istro-Romanians are not officially recognized as a national minority in Croatia and are not protected under the European Charter for Regional or Minority Languages. They are more exposed than ever to assimilation and are declining in number rapidly, with risks of disappearing completely in the following decades. The communities south of the Učka and Žejane have historically had very few contacts until the intervention of Romanian researchers, as they spoke Croatian at local fairs. Because of this, the feeling of ethnic and linguistic unity between both communities is weak. Currently, very few Istro-Romanians identify themselves as Romanian, and never with much enthusiasm. A large part of them affiliate with the region in which they live, that is, Istria. Not only Istro-Romanians adhere to an Istrian identity; approximately 25,000 people in Istria declare to be Istrian before any other nationality. Those Istro-Romanians who preferred to declare a national affiliation chose Croatian and a few Italian. Many Istro-Romanians think that the Croatian Government is not doing enough for the survival of their language and culture. They express a strong ethnic pride and their desire to pass their language to other generations, although those in the villages south of the Učka are more pessimistic about their future. There, the language shift to Croatian is more advanced than in Žejane, but the inhabitants are more protectionist regarding their culture. In Žejane, some Istro-Romanians still speak in Istro-Romanian with their grandchildren, and express less awareness about their extinction. Nowadays, the biggest goal of the Istro-Romanians is the full recognition by Croatia as an ethnic minority and a wider use of their language in education, newspapers, TV broadcasting and radio, all of this with the support of the Croatian Government.

== Geographical distribution ==
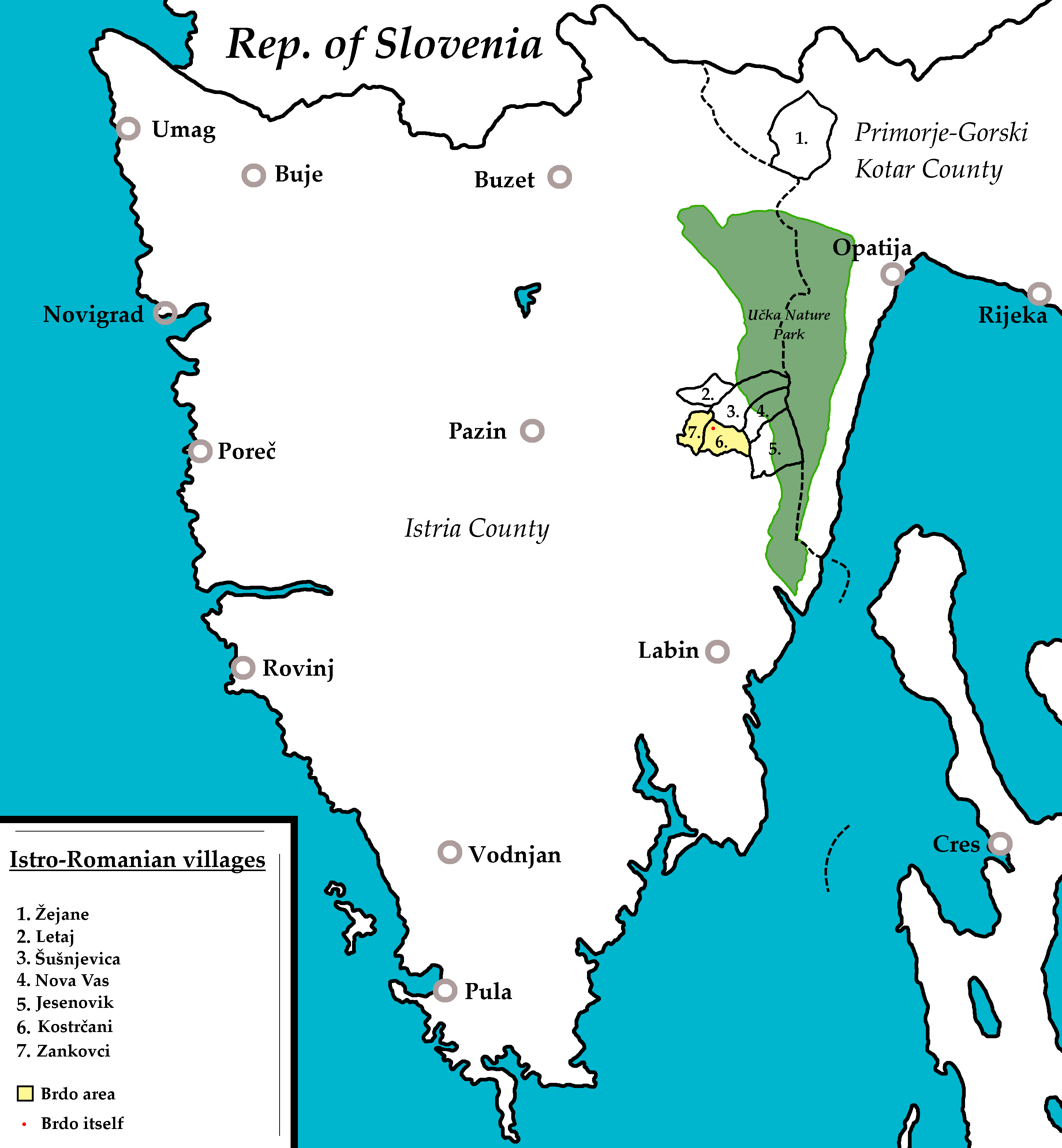
Villages populated by the Istro-Romanians nowadays

The territory where the Istro-Romanians live was once covered with forests, pastures and lakes, ideal for livestock or charcoal production. Their extent was vast, being scattered throughout almost all of Istria and the western part of Krk and leaving a large number of toponyms. However, the forests would begin to disappear and the lakes were drained. The soil stopped allowing productive agriculture, increasing poverty in the zone. They began to lose their traditional occupations as shepherds and began to be exposed to assimilation, ending with the Istro-Romanian presence of Krk in 1875. Those in Ćićarija were also assimilated, just maintaining their culture on the Croatian side, in Žejane. Many Istro-Romanians emigrated to the big cities. All this caused a decrease in the number of Istro-Romanians, which have been reduced to only eight settlements today.

Now, there are two identifiable groups of Istro-Romanians. The first is that of Žejane, an isolated village near the border with Slovenia. The second is in the villages south of the Učka. These are Šušnjevica, Nova Vas and Jesenovik, where the Istro-Romanians are more numerous, and Letaj, Kostrčani, Zankovci, the Brdo area (Brdo was a separate frazione during the interwar period that included Kostrčani, Zankovci and several hamlets) and the hamlets Miheli, Dražine, Draga and Jelavici (all part of the Brdo area) in smaller proportion. Of all of them, the one with the largest number of Istro-Romanian speakers is Nova Vas. Each of the Istro-Romanian villages has a name in its own language different from the official Croatian one. Thus, Žejane, Šušnjevica, Nova Vas, Jesenovik, Letaj, Kostrčani, Zankovci and Brdo become Jeiăn, Sușńévițę, Nóselo or Nósolo, Sucódru, Letåi, Costârčan, Zankovci and Bârdo (Brig for the hamlet). Other regions such as Ćićarija or Istria are called Cicearia and Istria, respectively. According to the memory of some, Istro-Romanian was also spoken in Gradinje and Grobnik and the hamlets Dolišćina, Trkovci and Perasi until recently. All of these villages at the south of the Učka constituted the Italian municipality of Valdarsa.

Detailed information of an unspecified date reports that, of the 134 inhabitants of Žejane, 53 (39%) can speak Istro-Romanian. In the southern villages, the Istro-Romanians make up a bit more than a quarter of the population, with approximately 75 (27%) speakers out of 276 in 2016. Therefore, there are about 120 Istro-Romanians living in their villages. Both communities, although now connected with roads, live in different Croatian administrative regions; the southern villages are located in the Istria County and Žejane, despite being geographically in Istria, is part of Primorje-Gorski Kotar County. However, the number of ethnic Istro-Romanians or people with Istro-Romanian ancestry in Istria could be as high as 1,500, even if they no longer speak the language and practice only some (or none) of their traditions.

After the end of the Second World War, many Istro-Romanians abandoned their native villages. In fact, the population of the villages today are less than a fifth of what they were in 1945. Many of them moved to nearby cities and towns, such as Kršan, Labin, Matulji, Opatija, Pazin, Pula and Rijeka. It is estimated that a total of 450 Istro-Romanians live in Croatia outside their settlements. Others decided to emigrate to other parts of the world, especially to New York City and Western Australia. The Istro-Romanian community living outside Croatia is made up of around 500 people. It is estimated that the total of Istro-Romanians of Žejane who now live abroad is 195, four times larger than the population residing in Žejane. Although the exact number of the diaspora of the Istro-Romanians from the south of the Učka is unknown, it is probably higher than that of Žejane since the emigration there was more potent and the population itself of the villages together was bigger than that of Žejane.

== Culture ==
=== Folklore ===
==== Dances and songs ====
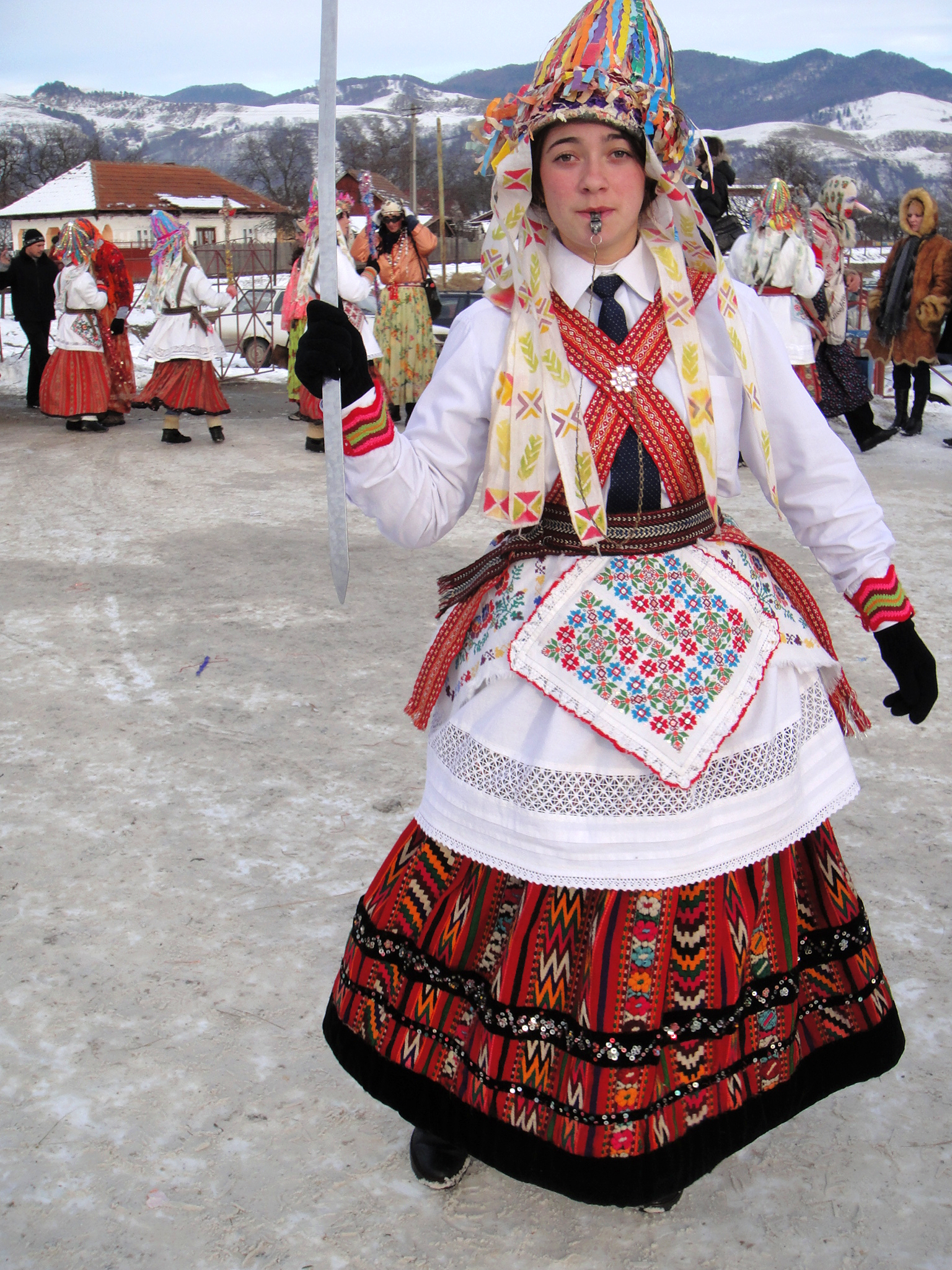
Similar costume of a Romanian woman in Dărmănești, in Western Moldavia

Istro-Romanian art is characterized by the domination of dances and songs. Istro-Romanian holidays tend to be somewhat austere, but accompanied by traditional musical instruments and dances. In one of these dances, called Columbaro, the peasants of the villages spend hours holding each other's hands in a closed circle, giving steps without order and with jumps without cadence. Dancers often form an arch with their hands through which a human chain passes underneath. According to Morariu, this dance is similar to those of Bukovina (a part of which is in Romania). One of the favorite dances of the Istro-Romanians is the Kolo, initially with a circular shape and then developing in skkocigori, that is, with high jumps. The dancers hold their hands and form a circle, slowly spinning all together under the music. Another dance is literally called "under the feet", in which a man and a woman or two of each dance together while hugging. Researchers who have studied Istro-Romanian dances have highlighted their primitivism.

Romanian researchers have shown great interest in the Istro-Romanian traditional music, publishing them in several magazines and works. That is why some of them have classified them into the following categories: songs, elegant songs, satires and diverse creations. Traian Cantemir, a Romanian researcher, published in 1935 Motivele dispariției poeziei populare la istroromâni ("Reasons for the disappearance of popular poetry of the Istro-Romanians") in the magazine Făt-Frumos, expressing concern regarding the future of their poetry. Most of the time, the verses of the poems were accompanied by a song, becoming popular songs for travels. Some foreign non-native travelers reported that their songs were like "ancient poems" and that "a long exclamation or rather, a barbaric and prolonged cry precedes any verse". The Istro-Romanian traveler could casually find a partner with whom he had a musical dialogue, keeping both entertained and with whom they practiced improvisation. Another author who investigated in depth the Istro-Romanian songs was the Romanian writer Petru Iroaie, identifying their similarities with those of Maramureș and Bukovina and the main motifs of them. Italian and especially Croatian influence diminished the knowledge of these songs, being mostly maintained by the elderly during the beginning of the 20th century. In addition, songs with some Croatian influences gradually began to circulate in the villages. Today, some young Istro-Romanians have some distrust or even fear of giving voice to those songs. In the Istro-Romanian language, as in other ones, the song is related to social realities, whereby the main subjects dealt with work in the field, love, warfare and interethnic relations. Today, the Istro-Romanians cannot remember certain words of their language, and therefore some old lyrics and verses can no longer be read. This has led Cantemir to define them as "fossils". However, some Istro-Romanian songs have managed to prevail until today. Among them are Knd am tire ("When [I asked] you"), Mes-am oča ši kola ("I went around"), Oj ljepure nu žuka ("Do not dance, rabbit") and Fina feta ("A nice girl").

The famous folk group Žejanski Zvončari (Žejane's Bell Ringers), founded by Mauro Doričić in 1997, advocates the preservation of the old carnivalesque Istro-Romanian traditions. It is made up of the zvončari (bell ringers), an exclusively male carnival dance group, and the "Kntaduri" (singers), an a cappella singing group. The association has also published new songs mainly in the Istro-Romanian dialect of Žejane, such as Tu ver fi ama ("You will be mine"), Pustu an Žejan ("Carnival in Žejane") and even an anthem, Žejanska, in both Croatian and Istro-Romanian. On the day of the carnival, the zvončari ring their bells from morning to evening, going from house to house and receiving food like bacon or eggs. At night, sandwiches made with the food received from the houses are distributed. On the day of the carnival there are also crabulele, boys and girls between 10 and 20 years old with harmonics and masks, who go from house to house dancing and telling jokes. One of the children has a basket for the gifts and the rest sticks to defend against strangers if necessary.

==== Costumes ====
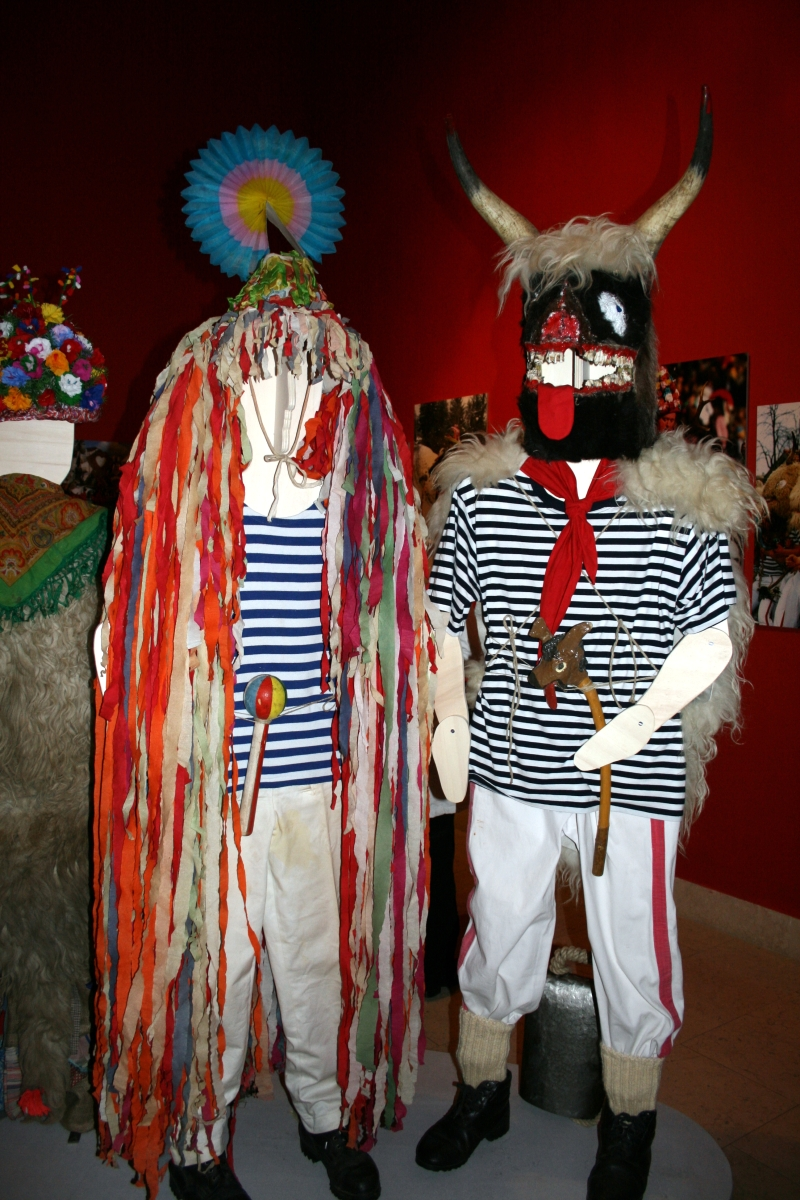
Costumes of the zvončari of Žejane during the Night of Museums at the Ethnographic Museum of Zagreb

The inhabitants of Žejane wore unique hats that "scared" the nearby populations. These were put so that the back of the hat covered the face, so that they could steal to those who had money, for reasons that researchers have described as "well grounded". Another hat worn in Žejane was the comaracu, with several colored ropes. The lower rope was made of velvet and the rest of silk. In the elderly, these ropes were dark, and in the youth, colorful and bright (dominating blue, yellow, red and green). The hats of the latter were decorated with peacock feathers and flower bouquets. These hats were similar to the ones worn between the Mureș and Târnava rivers in Transylvania. The costumes of men had a tight shirt with long, low and narrow suspenders, as well as opinci (traditional shoes, similar to those of the Romanians). On the shirt, they wore a waistcoat called crujat. In winter, they wore a cape called halea, and on the neck they had a scarf called fașă. During the 18th century, women wore a headscarf with their hair braided. In the 19th century they used a tulpan. The white shirt reached to the knees and was covered by a colorful dress called barhan. They also had opinci. According to Burada, their legs were covered by socks called bicivele and with garters called podvezi. Today's Istro-Romanians have difficulty describing the traditional costumes of their ancestors and few know the names of each clothes.

These traditional costumes are still preserved in Žejane, but only during the carnival or artistic events. However, the number of owners is very low, most of them being parents or grandparents, who pass them to the youth as a special symbol of the Istro-Romanian identity. Today's women's costumes are made up of a fațo (red scarf), an opleici (white shirt with an embroidery at the base of the neck), a pocirneka (black dress with a red ribbon and sleeveless) and a firtuhu (an apron put on the dress). Under the dress there is a white and tight skirt, to give a special look to the costume. At the waist, the dress is connected with the coanița (the widest "belt") and the tisuta (the thinnest "belt"), both with different colors. The legs, covered with the bicivi, wear black postole as footwear. Now, men wear a shirt or a black jacket. The pants, which can be white or black, are called braghesi. On the head they wear a black hat, and on the feet, postole, like women.

The costume of the zvončari consists of a typical sailor shirt with two fațole (white batistes). On the back is a sheepskin garment to which three large bells are attached. A kumaroak is carried on the head, in which hundreds of colorful strips that extend to the person's back are connected. Above the strips, there are two roses that symbolize the sun. The pants and footwear are not really different from those of the traditional costume.

=== Language ===
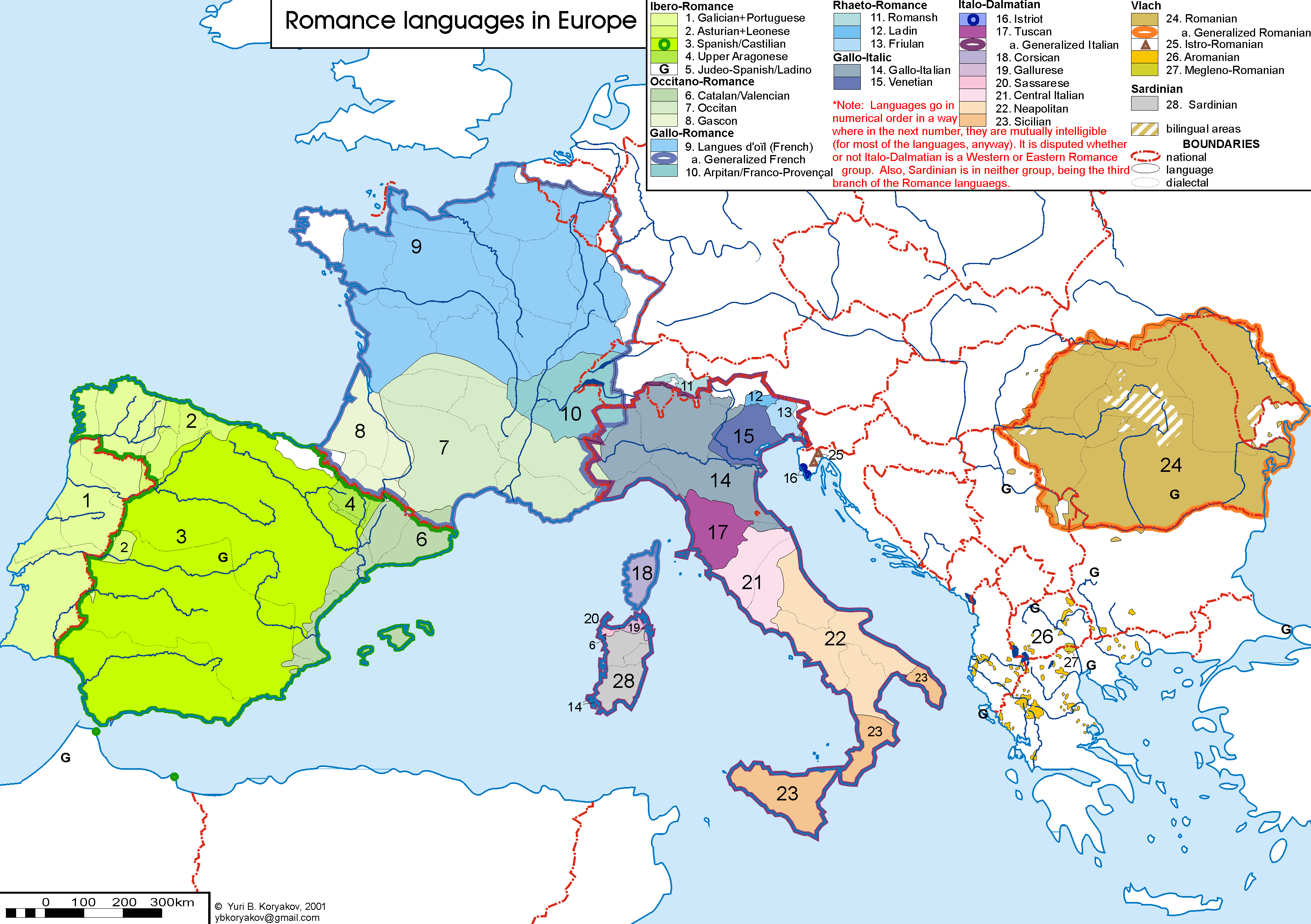
Position of the Romance languages in Europe, with Istro-Romanian and Istriot marked in Istria

Istro-Romanians speak the Istro-Romanian language (sometimes abbreviated as IR), part of the Eastern Romance languages spoken exclusively natively in Istria, Croatia. They have been described as the smallest ethnolinguistic group in Europe. Their language is classified by the UNESCO as a "seriously endangered language" because of the small number of fluent speakers the language has, education in Istro-Romanian is limited and the language is not usually used in many domains and the majority of younger speakers are adults, among others. Vrzić's revitalization project fulfills some of these points, however. According to several mostly Romanian researchers, the Istro-Romanian language is one of the four traditional and historical dialects of Romanian, alongside Aromanian, Megleno-Romanian and Daco-Romanian (linguistic name for the Romanian from Romania and its surroundings), all with a common ancestor, Proto-Romanian. However, Istro-Romanian can also be considered a language separated from Romanian by others, so there is no widely accepted view. Anyway, it is considered the daughter language (descendant) of Daco-Romanian, both being closer to each other than Aromanian and Megleno-Romanian are. Nevertheless, Istro-Romanian is strongly influenced by Croatian, with it affecting its morphology and with many linguistic loans, including function words. This has led some authors to describe it as a "mixed language".

The Istro-Romanian consists of two main variants, a northern one (in Žejane) and a southern one (in the villages south of the Učka). For example, for the oblique case, the variety of Žejane ("Zejanski") preserves synthetic marking, while the southern variety ("Vlaski") uses only prepositional marking, but neither of them marks the accusative case (e.g. "I can see Lara" would be "poč vedę Lara", literally "can see Lara"). Another difference is that in Zejanski, generally masculine nouns of Slavic origin mark the vocative case with "-e", while those of Latin origin with "-(u)le". In Vlaski, some nouns are marked with "-e" and some "-u". But although Istro-Romanian has two main dialects, each village has its own speech, differing slightly among the southern villages. The dialect of Krk, called by Croatian researchers as krčkorumunjski ("Krko-Romanian"), has been little studied and knowledge of it is minimal. The only texts known are Hail Mary and The Lord's Prayer. Even so, it is known that "Krko-Romanian" was an Istro-Romanian dialect as it had its characteristic rhotacism, as can be seen in Fintȉra and špirišôr.

There has never been a consensus on what writing system should be used for the Istro-Romanian alphabet, so Croatian and Romanian researchers have been recording and transcribing texts using different systems, with Croatian, Romanian or mixed orthographic elements. Vrzić has proposed the idea of unifying the writing system, which has been implemented on her website and is based on Croatian spelling. These changes may vary, for example, the word "when", to kând (Croatian-based), cănd (Romanian-based) and când (mixed).

However, Istro-Romanian is not the only language spoken by the Istro-Romanians. In fact, they represent a diglossic community (that is, they use more than one language), with no monolingual speakers of Istro-Romanian remaining. They usually also use the Chakavian dialect of Croatian and the elderly who attended to Italian schools, Italian or Istro-Venetian (the Istrian dialect of Venetian). Generally, the youth have no knowledge or understanding of the language, and prefer to use Croatian. Those Istro-Romanians who left the villages and migrated to the cities often use Croatian as the family language. The diaspora does not usually have knowledge of the language, result of intermarriages. Therefore, it is estimated that currently around the world, the Istro-Romanian speakers are only 1,000.

The following is an example of a text written in Istro-Romanian:

Comparison of The Lord's Prayer in Istro-Romanian, Romanian and English:
Istro-Romanian (Žejane dialect)	Romanian	English
Ciåia nostru carle-ș în cer,	Tatăl nostru care ești în ceruri,	Our Father in heaven,
neca se lume tev posvete,	sfințească-se numele Tău,	hallowed be your name,
neca vire cesaria te, necå fie voľa te,	vie Împărăția Ta, facă-se voia Ta,	your kingdom come, your will be done,
cum ăi in cer, așa și pre pemint.	precum în cer așa și pe pământ.	on earth as in heaven.
Păra nostra de saca zi de-na-vo asiez.	Pâinea noastră cea de toate zilele dă-ne-o nouă astăzi.	Give us today our daily bread.
Și na scuze pecatele nostre	Și ne iartă nouă greșelile noastre	Forgive us our sins
cum și noi scuzeim lu ceľi carľi na ofendes.	precum și noi iertăm greșiților noștri.	as we forgive those who sin against us.
Și nu duce pre noi in napast	Și nu ne duce pe noi în ispită	Save us from the time of trial
ma na zbave de cela revu.	ci ne izbăvește de cel rău.	and deliver us from evil.
–	Că a Ta este împărăția și puterea și slava,	For the kingdom, the power, and the glory are yours
–	acum și pururea și în vecii vecilor.	now and for ever.
Amen.	Amin.	Amen.

=== Houses and lifestyle ===
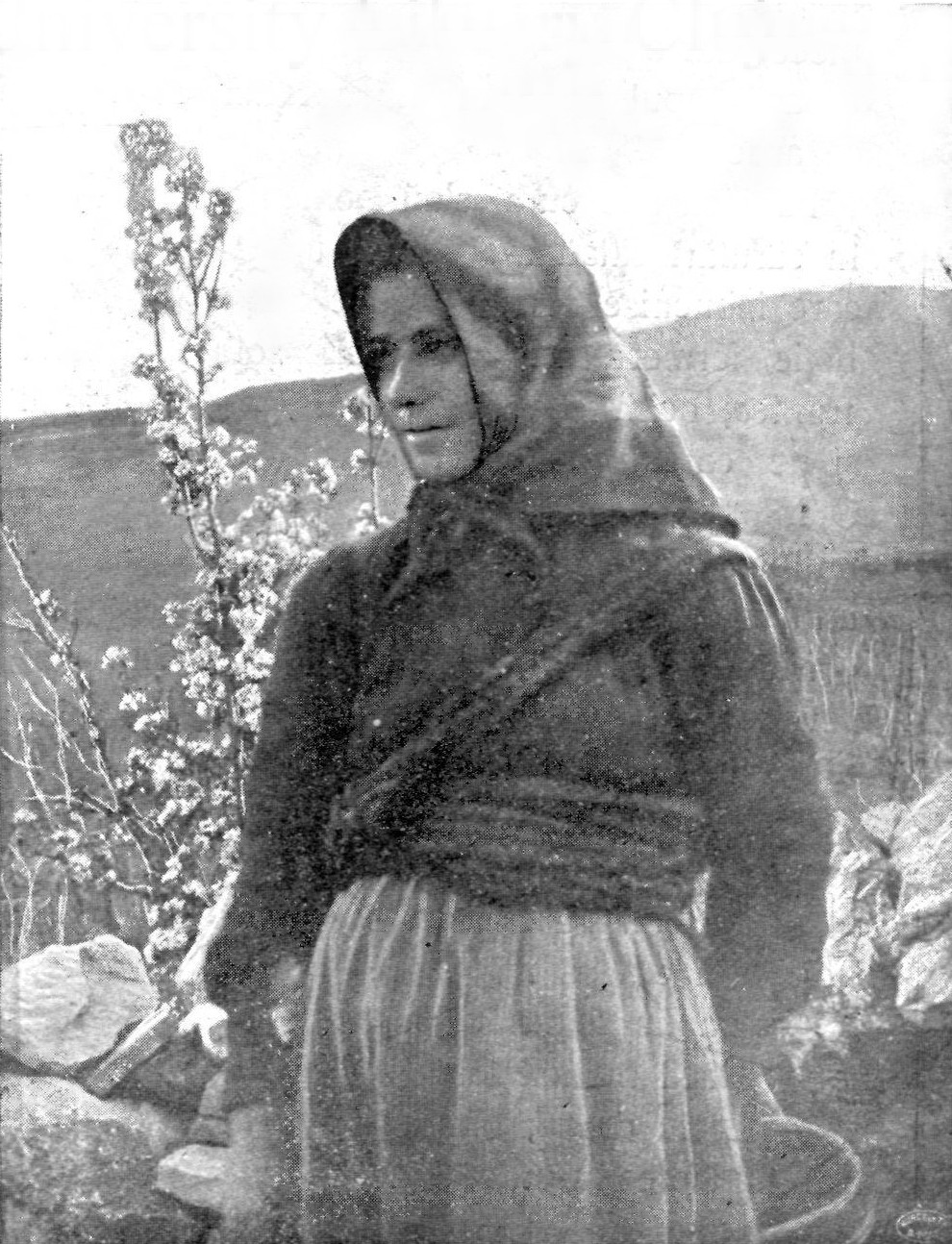
Istro-Romanian woman from Šušnjevica, 1906

The Istro-Romanian houses are adapted to the simplicity of typical mountain homes. These are built in stone, with double walls, one or two floors and are covered with reed mace or burnt clay. Inside this "carp", there is a large chimney with a column above where "a vault that receives the smoke and takes it to the oven" is placed. Near the chimney is the paleta or lopărița, a long metal "shovel" or "pole" with which the wood is moved or removed. In the center of the vault above the chimney there is usually a large chain called catena where the cadera (a cauldron) is attached. In it, water is boiled for cooking and polenta (mămăliga). According to Burada, plates and cutlery were hung around the chimney.

The "carp" that covers the house, bigger than the Romanian ones in Transylvania, serves as a refuge for people and also for animals such as chickens, pigs and sometimes, goats. To the left of the carp there is a room without chimney, with the door with the other room always open in winter to warm it. In this room there are several objects that are used only at special moments of the life of the owners. There is a misă (table), scanie (chairs) and a scriniu (closet), and on the boards over the ceiling, several portions of food such as cheese, bacon and pork legs, where "they smoke very well, as if they were in the vault of the chimney".

The sheets are of great importance among Istro-Romanian women. These can be in square stone supports or in wooden beds. In these beds there can be sacks of straw or maize on which there were pillows at their ends, some of them stuffed with straw and maize as well and others with goose feathers or horsehair. With the exception of the shirts and headscarfs that cover women's heads, every textile products used at home are usually made of wool and worked at home.

Those Istro-Romanians with social status or numerous families may have another room. Their houses have retained much of the architectural features of the past, and therefore have not changed much over time.

=== Literature and proverbs ===
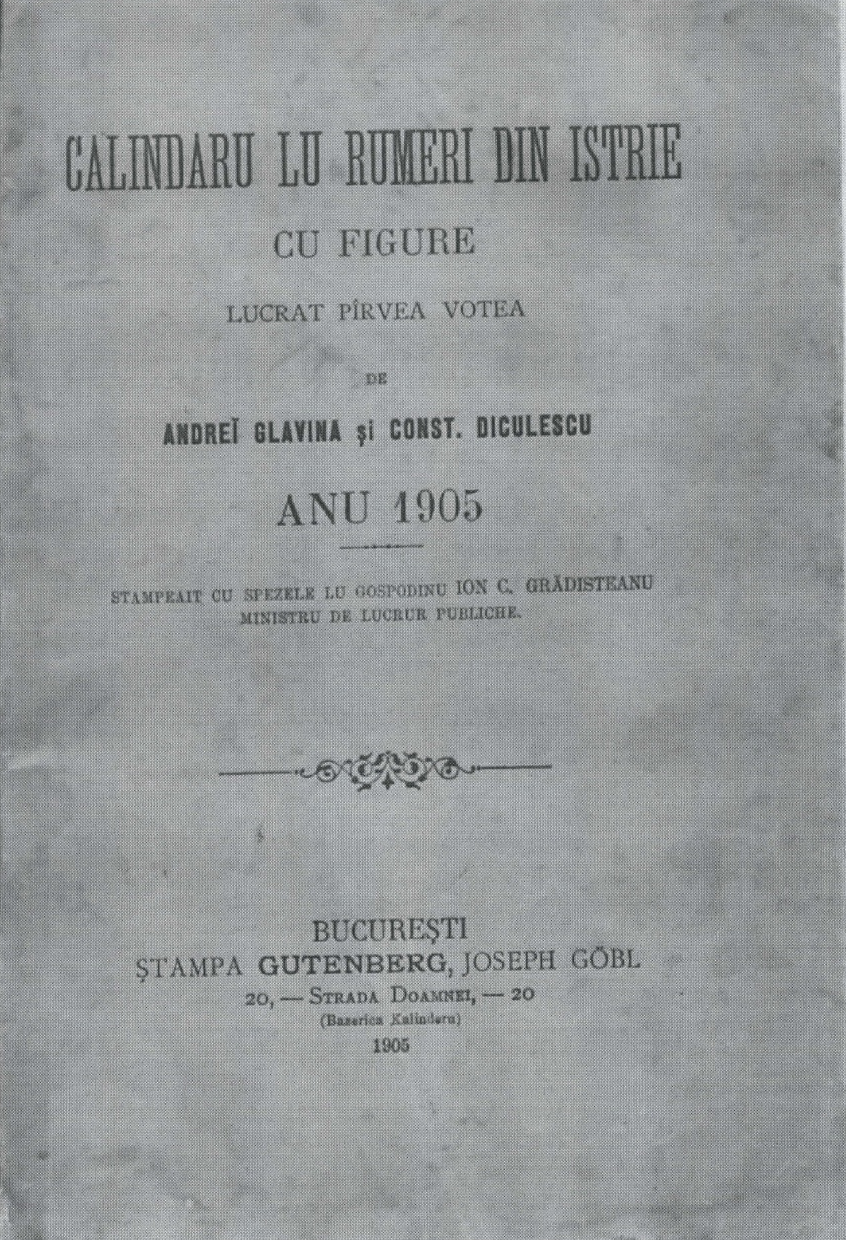
Title page of Calindaru lu rumeri din Istrie

Literature written in the Istro-Romanian language is scarce and quite recent. The first book written in this language, Calindaru lu rumeri din Istrie, was barely published in 1905. Its two authors were Glavina, an Istro-Romanian who always advocated the education of his people, and Diculescu. In this book, they gather words, proverbs and stories of the Istro-Romanians. Glavina would publish more works later, such as I romeni dell'Istria (The Romanians of Istria) and L'educazione nazionale (The national education) in the early 1920s. However, these texts, although about the Istro-Romanians, are in the Italian language. After his death, his wife Fiorella Zagabria published Promemoria e lettere, a posthumous work in which Glavina's last texts are collected. The "Istro-Romanian hymn", showed below, is located there.

Imnul istro-românilor (Romanian)	Inno istrorumeno (Italian)	Istro-Romanian hymn (English)
Roma, Roma e mama noastră noi romani rămânem România e sora noastră tot un sânge avem. Nu suntem singuri pe lume și ne-avem frați italieni cu mare nume mâna cu noi dați. Ca să fim frate și soră cum a dat Dumnezeu să trăim până la moarte eu și tu și tu și eu.	Roma Roma è la nostra madre noi rimaniamo romani la Romenia è la nostra sorella abbiamo tutti un sangue. Non siamo soli al mondo se abbiamo fratelli gli Italiani dal nome illustre ci hanno dato una mano. Siamo fratelli e sorelle come l'ha stabilito il Signore così lo sosterremo fino alla morte lo con te e tu con me.	Rome, Rome is our mother we remain Roman; Romania is our sister we all have one blood. We are not alone in the world and we have each other as brothers Italians of great name you give your hands with us. So we are brothers and sisters as God has established may we live to death me and you and you and me.

The second book in Istro-Romanian, Lu frati noștri: libru lu rumeri din Istrie, was published in 1928. Its author was a Romanian, Alexandru Leca Morariu, who made a trip to Istria in 1927 and another one in 1928 to study the Istro-Romanians. The first Istro-Romanian newspaper, Scrisoare către fråț rumer, has been publishing cult literature, such as the poems of the brothers from Nova Vas Gabriela and Gabriel Vretenar of 1997. In 2011, the Istro-Romanian Antonio Dianich publishes Vocabolario istroromeno‑italiano. La varietà istroromena di Briani (Băršcina), a dictionary for Italian and the Istro-Romanian dialect of Brdo. In 2016, the picture book Šćorica de lisica ši de lupu (The Story of The Fox and The Wolf) was published by a group of enthusiasts and researchers led by Vrzić.

The Istro-Romanians had many proverbs in the past. Today, they know less than before. Some of the best known proverbs are nu ie cårne far de ose ("there is no meat without bones"), lu Domnu și lu Drîcu nu se pote sluji o votę ("you cannot serve God and the Devil at the same time"), mora bure måcire și bovån ("the good mill can [even] grind rocks"), din cala lu omu bet și Domnu se dåie la o bande ("even God avoids the drunk") and cåsta lume făcuta ie cu scåle: uri mergu ăn sus, ål'ți ăn jos ("the world is made of stairs: some go up, others down").

=== Occupations ===
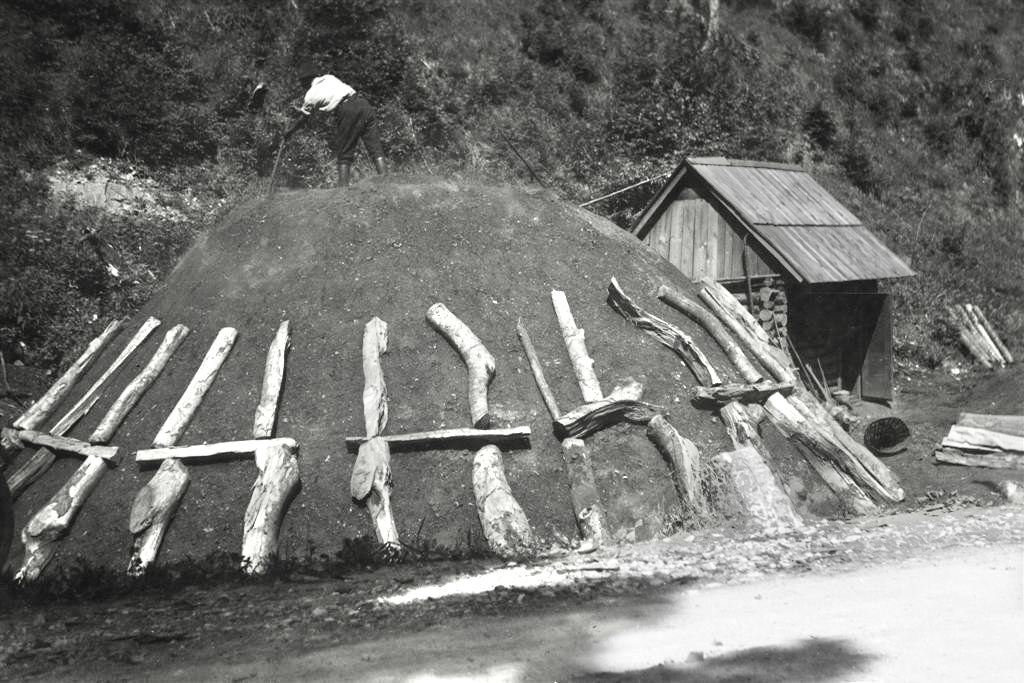
Pile of wood for making charcoal, similar to the Istro-Romanian ones, in 1931, Slovenia

Traditionally and historically, the Istro-Romanians were shepherds, an occupation that would disappear with the centuries. They carried their sheep dressed in wool suits, a hat and opinci with knots around the feet. They also had a walking stick carved with things of daily life that were sung to pass the time faster. The sheep were taken to pastures in which they would remain a month, time in which a small shepherd hut of wood was built. Inside it were sheepherding tools such as a cauldron for caș (a type of cheese), a kind of container of dry soil where food was eaten and spoons, the kikara (a cup), where fresh caș was placed during a day, and the bucket with which the sheep were milked, among others. The process of making caș of the Istro-Romanians is the same as in Romania.

Since the end of the 19th century, the economy and wealth of the Istro-Romanians has weakened severely. Their wine crops dried up, and agriculture is no longer as productive as before. They tried to replace the dried grapevines with American ones, which became increasingly difficult for them. Droughts are another problem. The situation in livestock is no different. They never practiced animal breeding much. According to a work published in 1992 by Romanian researchers Richard Sârbu and Vasile Frățilă, "the horses can't stand. In Šušnjevica there are only three horses. Among the birds there are only chickens. Sheepherding is weak. I have barely been able to find cheese for sale in Žejane. There are few sheep, and no goats".

A characteristic of the inhabitants of Žejane was the production of charcoal, taking place in the mountains and then selling them in mostly Rijeka or Opatija. To produce it, once the wood (always beech) was collected, the Istro-Romanians stayed in a haystack called gljevaricsa, two to three meters high and six to seven meters wide. Then, the wood was placed in the middle surrounded by straw and dry wood so that the fire could extend when it was lighted. Once produced, the charcoal was taken to the cities in order to market them. Specially practiced by men was cultivation in Šušnjevica of culinary sage, "undertaking a great business". Burada is, however, the only one to present this occupation. Many of them worked in other places outside the villages. Women, on the other hand, were generally housewives, although they could also be furlani, a kind of itinerant weavers. Other Istro-Romanians became miners or sailors. From the 20th century onwards, the Istro-Romanians' needs and occupations change due to the modernization of the society in which they live. Some chose to go to the cities and others stayed.

Currently, the Istro-Romanians in Žejane are mainly engaged in agriculture and wood exploitation; very few continue with sheepherding. A good part of the men are workers in nearby cities. In the southern villages, agriculture is the largest source of income. There are still people cultivating grapevines in Brdo. Material conditions are relatively better in Žejane than in the southern villages, and therefore it has a better quality of life. The production of charcoal is no longer very active, and is generally practiced for tourists.

=== Religion ===
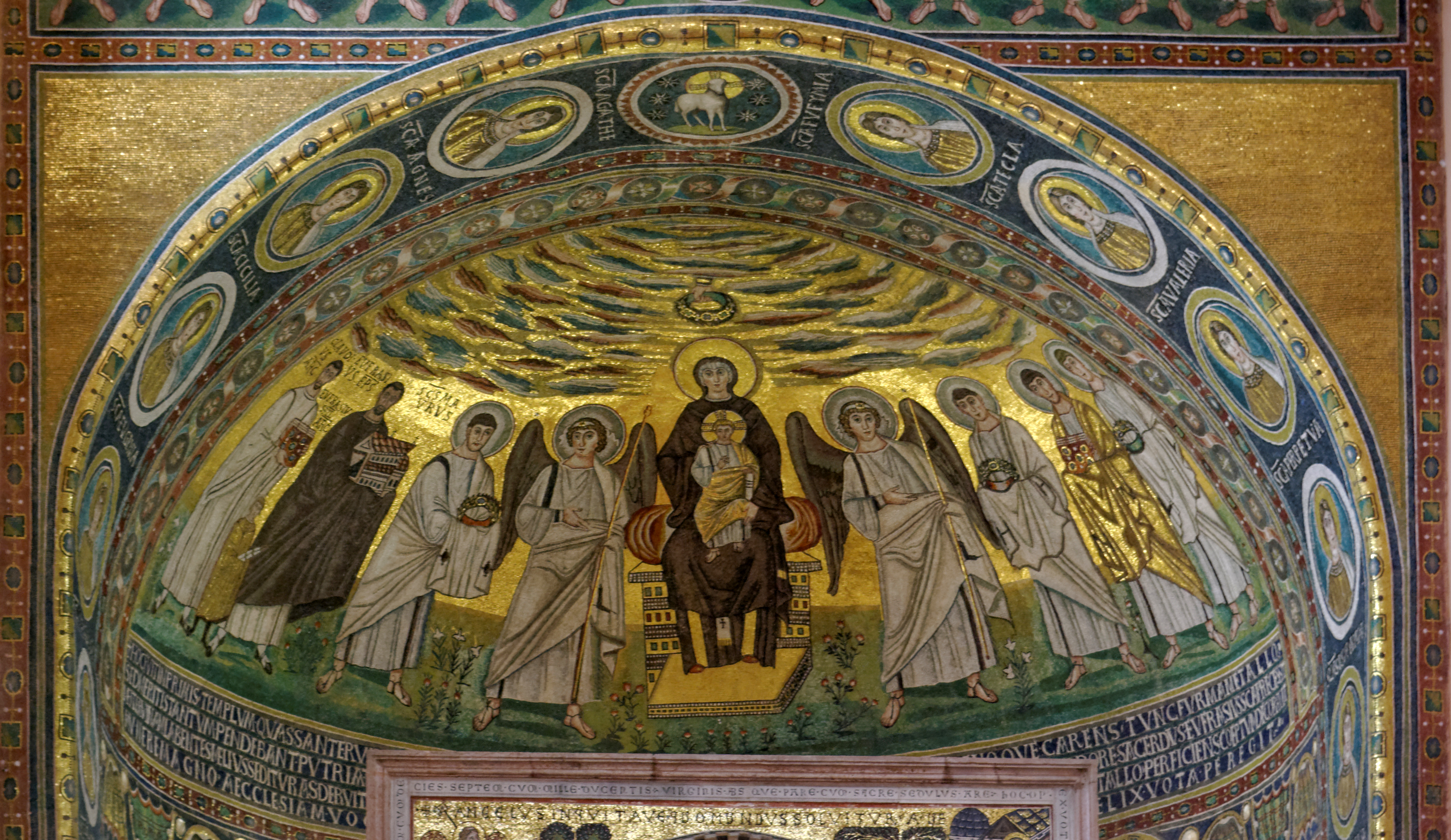
Mosaic with Mother Mary and Child at the Euphrasian Basilica in Poreč. This church is part of the Roman Catholic Diocese of Poreč-Pula, which administers the whole of Istria, including the Istro-Romanian settlements.

The Istro-Romanians are Christians, being the only Eastern Romance people belonging to the Catholic Church. Historically, the church has been the largest point of exposure for the Istro-Romanians to Croatian assimilation. Currently, it does not support the Istro-Romanian cause, with all services being given in Croatian. This has been the case since the second half of the 19th century. In fact, it is recorded that Croatian priests attracted mayors and other persons through corruption to act as they liked, disfavoring the Istro-Romanians.

Prior to this, the Austrian Empire allowed the ordination of priests among the Istro-Romanians (such as Micetici, born in Brdo), with sermons and confessions being given in Istro-Romanian (the rest of liturgical services used Latin at the time). Nowadays, it has been proposed that the Catholic Church in Romania could delegate three or four Romanian-speaking priests to the villages.

Examples of religious terms in Istro-Romanian are besęreca ("church"), catolica ("Catholic"), Domnedzeu ("God"), Isus ("Jesus") and svântă ("holy"), all of which are similar to the Romanian terms.

== Notable figures ==
The following is a list of notable Istro-Romanians or people of Istro-Romanian descent. In parentheses is the village of origin of each person or of their Istro-Romanian roots, if known.

- Alberto Cvecich (Nova Vas), priest.
- Antonio Dianich (father from Šušnjevica, mother from Kostrčani), professor of Italian and Latin, author of an Italian–Istro-Romanian dictionary (from the dialect of Brdo).
- Severino Dianich (father from Šušnjevica, mother from Kostrčani), priest and theologian.
- Andrei Glavina (Šušnjevica), politician, professor and one of the writers of the first book in Istro-Romanian.
- Giancarlo Pepeu, pharmacologist and professor. Potentially of distant Istro-Romanian descent. In the Pepeu family, it has been passed down that the family's name is of Istro-Romanian origin.
- Zvjezdana Vrzić (Zankovci), linguist and professor. Only partially Istro-Romanian.

=== Alleged ===
- Matthias Flacius Illyricus, Lutheran reformer and theologian. According to Emil Petru Rațiu, president of the Andrei Glavina Cultural Association of the Istro-Romanians, Flacius could have had Istro-Romanian roots or been one himself. He based this on the fact that Labin (Flacius' hometown) had in the early 16th century (when Flacius was born) a notorious Istro-Romanian presence. Rațiu also claimed that the house in which Flacius was raised was on a place called the "Plain of the Vlachs" and that the surname of his father, Andrea Vlacich, could come from the word "Vlach", which would have subsequently been Latinized as "Flacius".

Furthermore, a fringe claim attributing Istro-Romanian origins to inventor, engineer and futurist Nikola Tesla also exists.

== See also ==
- Aromanians
- Megleno-Romanians
- Romanians
- Vlach
- Moravian Wallachia
- Croatia–Romania relations
- Istrian Italians
- Vlachs in the history of Croatia
