= Istro-Romanian alphabet =

Alphabet used for the Istro-Romanian language

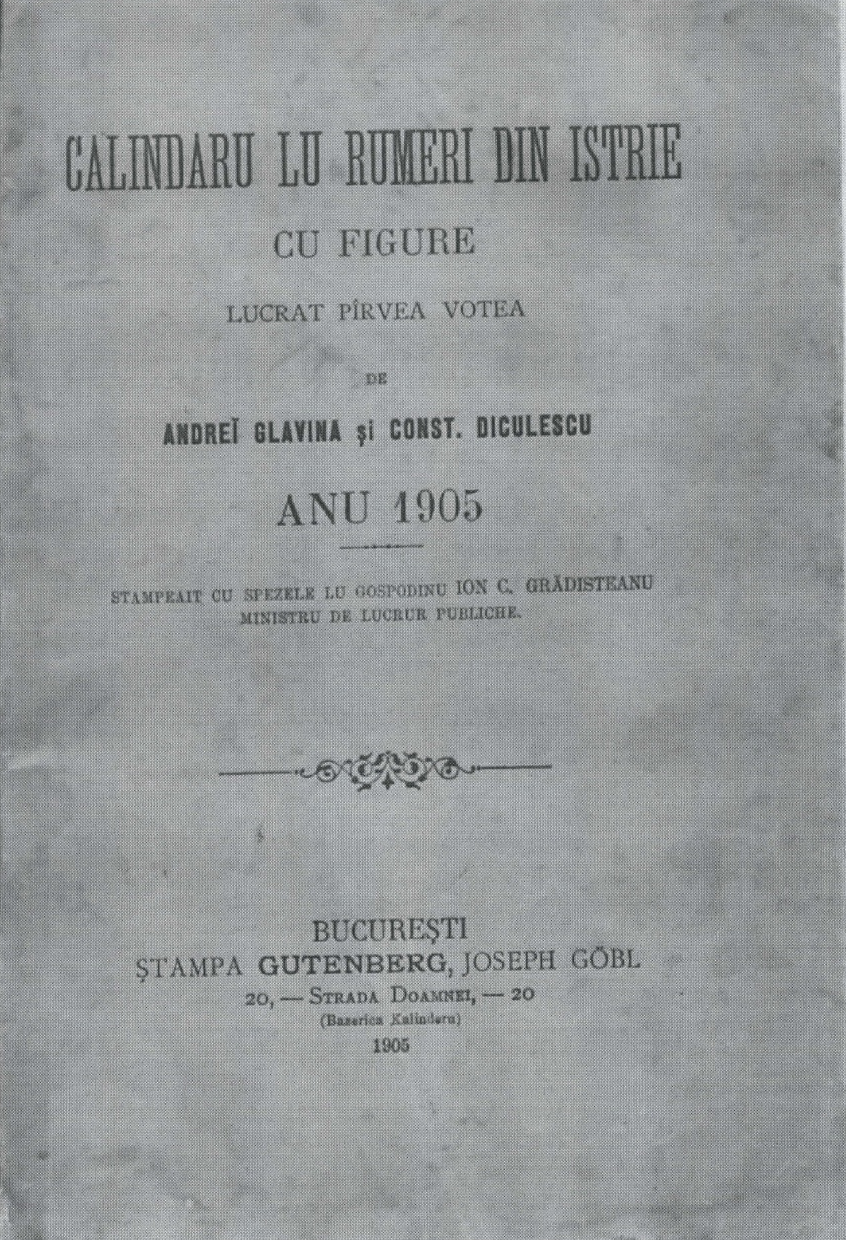
Title page of Calindaru lu rumeri din Istrie, the first book in Istro-Romanian

The Istro-Romanian alphabet is a variant of the Latin alphabet used by the Istro-Romanian language. The language is not standardized and therefore there are several writing systems for it. Up to three can be distinguished; one based on the Romanian language, one based on the Croatian language and one with characteristics of both.

== History ==
The Istro-Romanian language was first attested in 1698 in a document written by the Italian monk Ireneo della Croce. He gives 13 single nouns, 8 nouns with determiners and 2 sentences with their Italian translation. The monk used typical Italian letters, belonging to the Italian alphabet. Before this, toponyms and person names of probable Istro-Romanian origin had already been registered in previous documents. The first book entirely in Istro-Romanian, Calindaru lu rumeri din Istrie (Calendar of the Romanians of Istria), would be published centuries later in 1905 by the Istro-Romanian writer and politician Andrei Glavina and the Romanian historian Constantin Diculescu.

The first attempt to standardize the language was made by the Romanian linguist and philologist Sextil Pușcariu in his work Studii Istroromâne (Istro-Romanian studies). He mixed elements of the Romanian orthography with others of the Croatian one, giving rise to a mixed alphabet. In 1998, the Croatian linguist August Kovačec would publish an Istro-Romanian-Croatian dictionary in which he would update Pușcariu's hybrid version.

There is also a version based on standard Romanian, created in 1928 by the Romanian journalist and professor Alexandru Leca Morariu. He introduced this system in Lu frati noștri: libru lu rumeri din Istrie (To our brothers: book of the Romanians of Istria), the second book written in Istro-Romanian. This system was accepted by several other Romanian researchers, such as Traian Cantemir.

In 2009, the Croatian linguist and professor Zvjezdana Vrzić created a new alphabet, this time entirely based on the Croatian orthography. According to her, this alphabet represents all the phonemes found in the Istro-Romanian language and is easy to learn for them since they are already literate in Croatian. Vrzić has already implemented this system on her website "Preservation of the Vlaški and Žejanski Language".

Therefore, it is generally agreed that there are three spelling systems for the language, all of them with slight changes depending on the author. None of them has been officially adopted, making the Istro-Romanian still pending standardization.

== Alphabet ==
=== Romanian orthography ===
Capital letters
A	Ă	B	C	D	E	F	G	H	I	Ĭ	Î	J	L	Ľ	M	N	O	P	R	S	Ș	T	Ț	U	Ŭ	V	Z
Lower case letters
a	ă	b	c	d	e	f	g	h	i	ĭ	î	j	l	ľ	m	n	o	p	r	s	ș	t	ț	u	ŭ	v	z

Based on Morariu's 1928 version. It also includes the digraphs gh and ch.

=== Mixed orthography ===
Capital letters
A	Å	Â	B	C	Č	D	Ḑ	E	Ę	F	G	Γ	Ğ	H	I	Ǐ	K	L	Ľ	M	N	Ń	O	P	R	S	Ș	T	Ț	U	Ǔ	V	Z	Ž
Lower case letters
a	å	â	b	c	č	d	ḑ	e	ę	f	g	γ	ğ	h	i	ǐ	k	l	ľ	m	n	ń	o	p	r	s	ș	t	ț	u	ǔ	v	z	ž

Based on Kovačec's 1998 version.

=== Croatian orthography ===
Capital letters
A	Å	Â	B	C	Č	Ć	D	Đ	E	Ę	F	G	H	I	J	K	L	M	N	O	P	R	S	Š	T	U	V	Z	Ž
Lower case letters
a	å	â	b	c	č	ć	d	đ	e	ę	f	g	h	i	j	k	l	m	n	o	p	r	s	š	t	u	v	z	ž

Based on Vrzić's 2009 version. It also includes the digraphs dz, lj and nj.

== See also ==
- Aromanian alphabet
- Megleno-Romanian alphabet
- Romanian alphabet
