= MEV =

MEV, Mev, meV, or variation, may refer to:

== Physics ==
MeV and meV are multiples and submultiples of the electron volt unit, (eV), referring to:

- 1 MeV, 1 megaelectronvolt = 1,000,000 eV, and
- 1 meV, 1 millielectronvolt = 0.001 eV.

== Biology ==
- Measles virus
- Mink enteritis virus, a species of parvovirus that infects mink and causes enteritis

== Transportation ==
- M1133 medical evacuation vehicle, an American military vehicle
- Mills Extreme Vehicles, a British kit car manufacturer
- MEV Automobiles, a British electric car start-up
- MEV, ICAO code for Med-View Airline, a Nigerian airline
- MEV, station code for Merthyr Vale railway station, in Merthyr Vale, UK
- MEV, IATA code for Minden–Tahoe Airport, in Minden, Nevada, United States

== Other ==
- Map-entered variables, a variant of Karnaugh maps in logic optimization
- Mission Extension Vehicle, a satellite-servicing spacecraft developed by Orbital ATK
- Modern English Version, English translation of the Bible begun in 2005 and completed in 2014
- Musica Elettronica Viva, an Italian musical group
- Mev, a singular masculine possessive pronoun in Istro-Romanian grammar, equivalent to English "my"
- Mev., short for "Mevrou", Afrikaans equivalent of Mrs.
- Michigan Emergency Volunteers, a former name of the Michigan Volunteer Defense Force

== See also ==
- MEV-1 (disambiguation)
