= Letaj, Croatia =

Letaj Letai
- Village
- Location within Croatia
- Coordinates: 45°15′47″N 14°6′59″E
- Country: Croatia
- County: Istria County
- Municipality: Kršan

Area
  - Total: 5.5 km^{2} (2.1 sq mi)
- Elevation: 137 m (449 ft)

Population (2021)
  - Total: 46
  - Density: 8.4/km^{2} (22/sq mi)
- Time zone: UTC+1 (CET)
  - Summer (DST): UTC+2 (CEST)
- Postal code: 52233 Šušnjevica
- Area code: 052

Letaj (Italian: Lettai; Istro Romanian: Letai) is a village in Istria County, Croatia. Administratively, it belongs to the municipality of Kršan. The village is inhabited mostly by Istro-Romanians.

== Climate ==
Since records began in 1995, the highest temperature recorded at the local weather station at the barrier was 41.0 °C (105.8 °F), on 19 July 2007. The coldest temperature was −15.3 °C (4.5 °F), on 26 January 2000.

== Demographics ==
According to the 2021 census, the population of Letaj was 46. It was 43 in 2011.

Population number according to the census
1857	1869	1880	1890	1900	1910	1921	1931	1948	1953	1961	1971	1981	1991	2001	2011
191	198	212	238	220	218	183	182	166	136	105	76	67	68	52	43
