= Giancarlo Pepeu =

Italian pharmacologist and professor

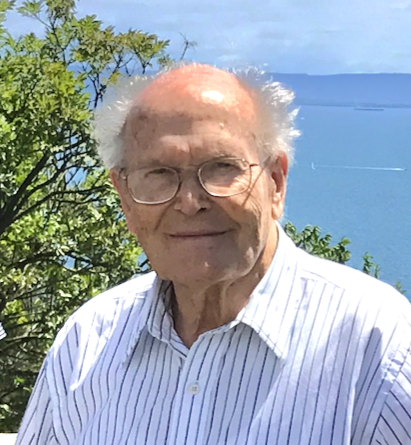
- Photograph of Giancarlo Pepeu taken while he was going to Trieste
- Born: 29 March 1930; Milan (Italy)
- Died: 20 November 2021 (aged 91); Florence (Italy)
- Education: University of Florence
- Occupation: University Professor
- Known for: Neuropharmacology, Acetylcholine
- Spouse: Ileana Marconcini (m.1964)
- Parent(s): Francesco Pepeu, Edvige d'Anna
- Relatives: Stefano Marconcini

Giancarlo Pepeu (29 March 1930 – 20 November 2021) was an Italian Emeritus Professor of Pharmacology at the University of Florence and an Honorary Fellow of the British Pharmacological Society. He was from Milan and graduated with a Laurea degree in Medicine from the University of Florence to pursue an academic career.

== Biography ==
Giancarlo Pepeu was born on 29 March 1930 in Milan, Italy. He was a member of the Pepeu family, whose earliest known member was Stefano Pepeu, a merchant in Trieste, born about 1750, presumably to immigrant parents. In the Pepeu family, it has been passed down that the surname Pepeu is of Istro-Romanian origin. The termination -u, common in surnames of the related Romanians, could be proof of distant Istro-Romanian ancestry of the Pepeu family. Giancarlo's family is the only one known to carry the surname Pepeu in Trieste and in the rest of Italy.

Upon completing his studies in 1954, Giancarlo Pepeu began research at the Florence's Institute of Pharmacology, under the guidance of Professor Mario Aiazzi-Mancini. In 1958, he became a postdoctoral fellow at Yale University's Department of Pharmacology, and from 1961 to 1968 he contributed as assistant professor across Italian Universities in Sassari, Pisa and Cagliari. Subsequently, Pepeu became full professor of pharmacology in 1968. In 1974, Pepeu was appointed Professor Pharmacology at the University of Florence's Faculty of Medicine, a position he held until his retirement in 2005. While in Florence he also held roles as the Dean for Scientific Research and International Relations, and as the Director of the Department of Preclinical and Clinical Pharmacology. Additionally, Pepeu served as the president of the Italian Pharmacological Society.

Pepeu died on 20 November 2021.

== Academic research ==
Giancarlo Pepeu's scientific interests were concentrated in Endocrinology and Neuroscience including the study of Acetylcholine, Cholinergic agents and, in particular, neurotransmitters like glutamate and GABA alongside Acetylcholine (ACh) and other biogenic amines known for their substantial effects on the central and autonomic nervous system. His initial work on ACh revolved around investigating how psychotropic drugs could alter the concentration and release of ACh, thereby influencing mechanisms underlying EEG and behavioral changes. While at Yale University, Pepeu and his collaborator Nick Giarman demonstrated that antimuscarinic drugs like Atropine and Scopolamine lowered ACh level in the cerebral cortex, implying a potential connection between this phenomenon and the amnesic effect of these drugs. Subsequently, they laid the foundational principles for comprehending ACh release from the cerebral cortex, paving the way for subsequent studies on drugs and afferent inputs from subcortical structures modulating this process. In Florence, Pepeu expanded his inquiries to encompass in vivo and in vitro studies of ACh release, broadening his investigations to glutamate, GABA and adenosine release. His research indicated that cortical networks operating via complex neurotransmitter interactions were responsible for drug effects on memory. In the later stages of his career, Pepeu's activity shifted to exploring the role of central cholinergic pathways in the pathophysiology of Alzheimer's disease, where he revealed the fundamental role of neuroinflammation in animal models with the condition.

== Published works ==
- According to PubMed, G. Pepeu is author of more than 264 papers, published between 1955 and 2017 and coauthored six books
