= Zankovci =

Zankovci Zancovici
- Village
- Location within Croatia
- Coordinates: 45°14′06″N 14°06′29″E
- Country: Croatia
- County: Istria County
- Municipality: Kršan

Area
  - Total: 4.2 km^{2} (1.6 sq mi)

Population (2021)
  - Total: 9
  - Density: 2.1/km^{2} (5.5/sq mi)
- Time zone: UTC+1 (CET)
  - Summer (DST): UTC+2 (CEST)
- Postal code: 52233 Šušnjevica
- Area code: 052

Zankovci (Italian: Zancovici, Istro Romanian: Zankovci) is a village in the Istria County, Croatia. Administratively it belongs to the municipality of Kršan. The village is inhabited mostly by Istro-Romanians.

== Demographics ==
According to the 2021 census, the population of Zankovci was 9. It was 8 in 2011.

Population number according to the census
1880	1890	1900	1910	1948	1953	1961	1971	1981	1991	2001	2011
184	170	180	208	163	141	114	58	28	21	10	8
