= Nova Vas, Kršan =

Nova Vas Noselo
- Village
- Location within Croatia
- Coordinates: 45°14′38″N 14°9′29″E
- Country: Croatia
- County: Istria County
- Municipality: Kršan

Area
  - Total: 6.4 km^{2} (2.5 sq mi)

Population (2021)
  - Total: 58
  - Density: 9.1/km^{2} (23/sq mi)
- Time zone: UTC+1 (CET)
  - Summer (DST): UTC+2 (CEST)
- Postal code: 52233 Šušnjevica
- Area code: 052

Nova Vas (Italian: Villanova d'Arsa; Istro Romanian: Noselo) is a village in Istria County, Croatia. Administratively it belongs to the municipality of Kršan. The village is inhabited mostly by Istro-Romanians.

== Demographics ==
According to the 2021 census, the population of Nova Vas was 58. It was 69 in 2011.

Population number according to the census
| 1857 | 1869 | 1880 | 1890 | 1900 | 1910 | 1921 | 1931 | 1948 | 1953 | 1961 | 1971 | 1981 | 1991 | 2001 | 2011 |
| 291 | 236 | 240 | 233 | 224 | 255 | 252 | 251 | 201 | 180 | 153 | 124 | 109 | 94 | 74 | 69 |
