= Andrei Glavina =

Istro-Romanian writer, professor and politician

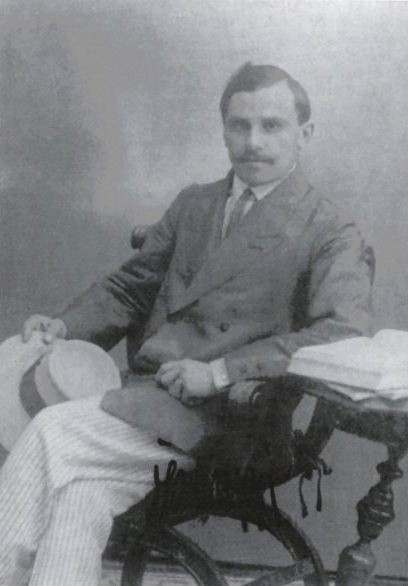
- Andrei Glavina in 1920
- Born: 30 November 1881; Šušnjevica, Austro-Hungarian Empire
- Died: 9 February 1925 (aged 43); Pula, Kingdom of Italy
- Occupations: Writer, professor, politician
- Spouse: Fiorella Zagabria

Andrei Glavina (30 November 1881 – 9 February 1925; Croatian: Andrej Glavina; Italian: Andrea Glavina) was an Austro-Hungarian-born Istro-Romanian writer, professor and politician born in Šušnjevica. Known as the "Apostle of the Istro-Romanians", he is recognized for his struggle for the Istro-Romanian culture and language, being notable his book Calindaru lu rumeri din Istrie, the first in history written in this language in collaboration with Constantin Diculescu. He also managed the creation of an Istro-Romanian municipality in 1922 being the first mayor, giving classes in Istro-Romanian in the only school of the municipality.

Glavina was born in 1881 in the village of Šušnjevica. At age 12, he was taken to Romania by the Romanian ethnographer and folklorist Teodor Burada to be educated at the Alexandru Ioan Cuza University in Iași. Then he would return to Istria to teach in two other villages until the opening of the first school in Šušnjevica by Italy just after the end of the World War I.

== Biography ==
Andrei Glavina was born on 30 November 1881 in the village of Frascati-Susgnevizza (now Šušnjevica), at the moment part of the municipality of Bogliuno (now Boljun). Teodor Burada, a Romanian ethnographer and folklorist that visited the region of Ćićarija to study the Istro-Romanian language, met the 12-year-old Glavina in 1893. He was convinced that he could save the fate of the Istro-Romanians, so, with the permission of his parents, Teodor took Glavina to Romania to study in the University of Iași. He passed his studies even after not going to school for a while. At the beginning of the 20th century, Glavina returned to Istria as a qualified teacher of the Romanian and Italian languages to teach at secondary schools, first in Parenzo (now Poreč) and then in Santa Domenica d'Albona (now Sveta Nedelja), where he remained until 1918.

In 1905, he published the first book written entirely in the Istro-Romanian language alongside the Romanian historian Constantin Diculescu, Calindaru lu rumeri din Istrie, in which Istro-Romanian popular words, proverbs and stories are compiled. Later, in 1920, he published the historical-political text I romeni dell'Istria and L'educazione nazionale, a magazine about the bilingual education of the Italian-Romanian schools. His last works were collected in Promemoria e lettere by his spouse, Fiorella Zagabria.

Glavina died on 9 February 1925 due to tuberculosis in a hospital in Pula.

== Lifetime work ==
=== Intellectual ===
Glavina wanted to awaken the identity of the other Istro-Romanians and transmit his language and culture to them. Therefore, he struggled unsuccessfully for the severely deficient education of the Istro-Romanians, despite having the support of some Istro-Romanians and having addressed the Romanian professor Alexiu Viciu with the intention that Romania pressured the Austria-Hungarian Empire to establish a Romanian school for the Istro-Romanians. Later, Glavina would go to the only Istro-Romanian village outside of the Frascati-Susgnevizza area, Seiane (now Žejane), to find out if they also wanted a Romanian school and to get Romania to support the project. However, Austria-Hungary, partly due to the Croatian pressure, remained firm in its decision, so Glavina had to limit himself to advertising campaigns in local and national newspapers and failed contacts with deputies of the empire.

However, after World War I, when Istria was annexed by the Kingdom of Italy, Glavina made the same petition again. The school of Frascati-Susgnevizza was immediately opened with Glavina as its leader. To celebrate it, Glavina wrote a patriotic anthem for the Istro-Romanians, Imnul istro-romanilor. The popularity among the children of the school began to grow to the point that between 1919 and 1920, there were 180 students, later extending to a total of 443. Although the classes were given in Istro-Romanian, the textbooks were in Italian and later in Romanian. Nevertheless, after his death, the Romanian school was replaced by an Italian one.

Due to his efforts to preserve the culture of his people, Glavina is commonly called as the "Apostle of the Istro-Romanians".

=== Political ===
At the same time, Glavina aimed to unify the Istro-Romanian villages in one single municipality south of the Učka mountain range, as the economic and social conditions there were bad. Although Austria-Hungary always opposed the project, Italy took it into consideration. Finally, it was approved by the Provincial Council and the municipality of Valdarsa was created on 19 January 1922, of which Glavina was its first mayor. After being named mayor, Glavina worked on the economic conditions of the municipality and planned the construction of a larger school, a road to connect with the Adriatic coast, a post office and a telegraph, among others.

However, his greatest ambitions were to recover the Raša River basin (although this was previously proposed by Venice and Austria), which was completed in 1932, and the exploitation of a nearby semi-abandoned coal mine. By the time these projects were completed, Glavina had already passed away. He was succeeded as mayor by a local, Francesco Bellulovich.
