= Ireneo della Croce =

Ireneo della Croce (1625–1713) was a Carmelite preacher and chronicler. della Croce was born in Trieste. He lived in the monasteries of Venice and Padova, but visited his hometown frequently. His magnum opus (Historia antica e moderna, sacra e profana ... della città di Trieste ... fin'a quest'anno 1698) was printed in Venice with funds from the Trieste Comune and some private citizens. In spite of its title, the book stopped in the year 1000. A second part, which chronicled Trieste up to 1702, was published in 1881. della Croce's early attestations of the Istro-Romanians and their language are relevant in academic research. della Croce died in Venice in 1713.

A street in Trieste was dedicated to him.
