= MEV-1 =

MEV-1 can mean:

- MEV-1 (spacecraft), the first Mission Extension Vehicle spacecraft
- MEV-1 (fictional pathogen), the fictional virus in the film Contagion

== See also ==
- MEV (disambiguation)
