= Petar Skok =

Croatian linguist and onomastics expert

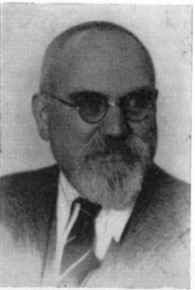
- Petar Skok
- Born: March 1, 1881; Jurkovo Selo, Žumberak, Austro-Hungarian Empire
- Died: 3 February 1956 (aged 74); Zagreb

Academic background
- Education: University of Vienna (PhD)

Petar Skok (Croatian pronunciation: [pêtar skôk]; 1 March 1881 – 3 February 1956) was a Croatian linguist and onomastician. His central work is the four-volume etymological dictionary of Serbo-Croatian.

== Biography ==
Skok was born to a Croatian family in the village of Jurkovo Selo, Žumberak. From 1892 to 1900 he attended the Higher Real Gymnasium in Rakovac near Karlovac. At the University of Vienna (1900 – 1904) he studied Romance and Germanic philology and Indo-European studies, passing his professorship exam in 1906. He received Ph.D. with a thesis on South French toponomastics.

As a high-school professor he taught in Banja Luka and served as a librarian of the Royal museum in Sarajevo. In the period from 1919 to his retirement, he worked at the Romance seminar department of the Faculty of Philosophy at the University of Zagreb, and taught French language and literature at Viša pedagoška škola in Zagreb.

He started writing as a gymnasium student, having published literary reviews under the pseudonym of P. S. Mikov. Later he devoted himself completely to southeastern Europe linguistic studies, chiefly of Romance languages: Vulgar Latin, Dalmatian, with special interest to Romance influence on Croatian dialects and other languages in Southeast Europe. He studied the history of Slavs, languages and interactions of languages from eastern coast of Adriatic into hinterland with special care to onomastics. Thanks to Skok's effort, the centre of Croatian onomastics studies has been since 1948 in the institution which is today Institute of Croatian Language and Linguistics.

Skok died in Zagreb.

== Works ==
As a highly prolific writer, Skok published dozens of books and hundreds of research papers in journals; his revised bibliography by Žarko Muljačić extends it to more than 650 works. Some of his notable books are:

- Naša pomorska i ribarska terminologija na Jadranu [Our Sea-faring and Fishing Terminology on the Adriatic] (Split, 1933)
- Dolazak Slavena na Mediteran [The Arrival of Slavs on the Mediterranean] (Split, 1934)
- Pregled francuske gramatike I–II [An Overview of French Grammar] (Zagreb, 1938–1939)
- Osnove romanske lingvistike, I–III [The Basics of Romance Linguistics] (Zagreb, 1940)
- Slavenstvo i romanstvo na jadranskim otocima: Toponomastička istraživanja I–II [Slavic and Romance on the Adriatic Islands: Toponomastic Studies] (Zagreb, 1950)
- Etimologijski rječnik hrvatskoga ili srpskoga jezika I-IV [An Etymological Dictionary of Croatian or Serbian Language] (Zagreb, 1971–1974)

He left in manuscript an unfinished etymological dictionary that was published posthumously by his disciple and co-worker Valentin Putanec in four volumes under the title of Etimologijski rječnik hrvatskoga ili srpskoga jezika, 1971–1974. It is the most extensive complete Serbo-Croatian etymological dictionary, with more than 10 000 headwords. In the words of academic August Kovačec, Skok's etymological dictionary is a synthesis of "his scientific efforts as a whole in the fields of etymology and linguistics generally" and represents the most notable "contribution of a scientific individual to Croatian language and the study of Croatian language in the 20th century".

== Legacy ==
In the honour of Petar Skok etymological-onomastics conferences are held with contributions of Croatian and foreign experts. So far six of them have been held, chronologically in Zagreb (1987), Zadar, Pula, Krk, Vukovar and in Korčula (2006).
