= Žejane =

- Village
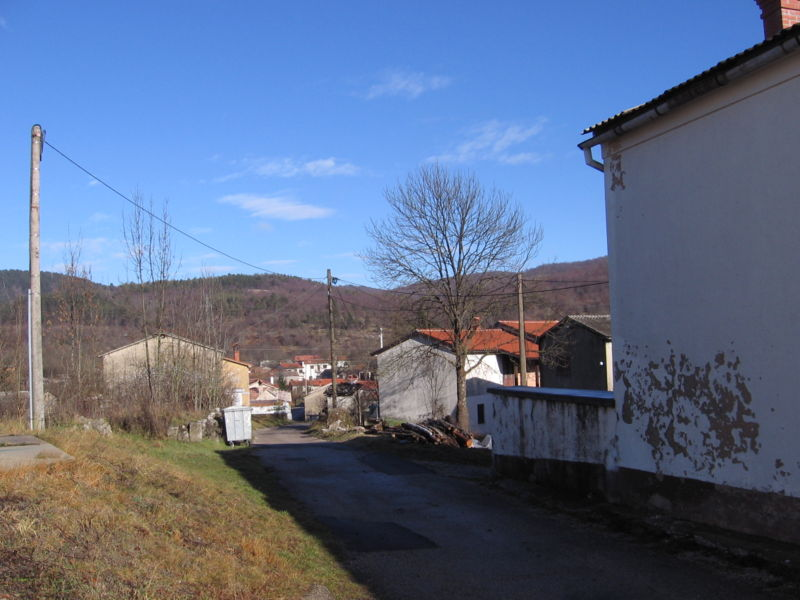

- Location within Croatia
- Coordinates: 45°26′26″N 14°11′40″E
- Country: Croatia
- County: Primorje-Gorski Kotar
- Municipality: Matulji

Area
  - Total: 22.6 km^{2} (8.7 sq mi)
- Elevation: 618 m (2,028 ft)

Population (2021)
  - Total: 105
  - Density: 4.65/km^{2} (12.0/sq mi)
- Time zone: UTC+1 (CET)
  - Summer (DST): UTC+2 (CEST)
- Postal code: 51212

Žejane (Istro Romanian: Jeiăn; Italian: Seiane) is a village in the eastern part of the mountainous Ćićarija area in Istria, in western Croatia. Administratively it belongs to the municipality of Matulji in Primorje-Gorski Kotar County. In 2011, the population of Žejane was 130.

== Description ==
The village is 18 km north-west of Matulji, near the municipality road leading from Vele Mune and Male Mune to Opatija and Rijeka, in a karst valley between two mountain ridges.

The village is known for the Ćići: Istro-Romanians who settled here in the late 15th, or early 16th century from 1510 until 1525, when the villages Vele Mune, Male Mune, and Žejane were settled by Krsto Frankopan.

== Demography ==
Population number according to the census
1857	1869	1880	1890	1900	1910	1921	1931	1948	1953	1961	1971	1981	1991	2001	2011
505	546	531	565	601	596	547	540	511	493	383	379	250	189	141	130

== Bibliography ==
- "Naselja i stanovništvo Republike Hrvatske 1857-2001" [Settlements and population of the Republic of Croatia] (in Croatian). Croatian Bureau of Statistics.
- Ribarić, Josip (2002). O istarskim dijalektima: razmještaj južnoslavenskih dijalekata na poluotoku Istri s opisom vodičkog govora (in Croatian). Pazin: Josip Turčinović.
- "Stanovništvo prema starosti i spolu po naseljima, popisi 2011" (in Croatian). Croatian Bureau of Statistics.
- Zbornik općine Lanišće [Anthology of Lanišče municipality, 2002, 2004, 2006, 2008, 2010, 2012] (in Croatian). Pazin: Josip Turčinović.
- "Žejane". Istrian Encyclopedia. 2008.
