= Istro-Romanian grammar =

Grammar of the Istro-Romanian language

Istro-Romanian grammar expresses the structure of the Istro-Romanian language. It is similar to those of other Eastern Romance languages.

== Morphology ==
Istro-Romanian is thought to have evolved from Daco-Romanian (which instead may have evolved independently). The evolution shows two distinct features. Noun declension shows a rationalisation of forms: normal noun declension almost totally disappeared in Istro-Romanian, whereas verbal inflexion is more conservative and its evolution is not as pronounced.

== Grammar ==
=== Articles ===
Articles have two forms: definite and indefinite. The definite article may be nominal or adjectival, the nominal being added to nouns, and the adjectival placed before adjectives.

The nominal forms are: for masculine nouns: -l and -le, for feminine -a in the singular, and for masculine -i and feminine -le in the plural. As in spoken Daco-Romanian, the -l of the masculine singular definite article is dropped, leaving the linking -u- vowel, e.g. DR lupul > IR lupu (the wolf), DR ursul > IR ursu (the bear), DR mielul > IR mľelu (the lamb).

The -le ending is used for all masculine singular nouns ending in -e, e.g. fråtele (the brother), sorele (the sun), cărele (the dog). Some examples of masculine nouns showing case endings, nominative=accusative, genitive=dative. The vocative case is not shown as this normally corresponds with the nominative.

- fiľ (son), fiľi (pl.)

Case	Istro-Romanian	Aromanian	Megleno-Romanian	Romanian	English
Nom/Acc sg.	fiľu	hiljlu	iľiu	fiul	the son
Gen/Dat sg.	lu fiľu	a hiljlui	lu iľiu	al fiului	of/to the son
Nom/Acc pl.	fiľi	hiljli	iľii	fiii	the sons
Gen/Dat pl.	lu fiľi	a hiljlor	lu iľii	al fiilor	of/to the sons

- socru (father-in-law), socri (pl.)

Case	Istro-Romanian	Aromanian	Megleno-Romanian	Romanian	English
Nom/Acc sg.	socru	socrulu	socru	socrul	the father-in-law
Gen/Dat sg.	lu socru	a socrului	lu socru	al socrului	of/to the father-in-law
Nom/Acc pl.	socri	socri	socri	socrii	the fathers-in-law
Gen/Dat pl.	lu socri	a socrilor	lu socri	al socrilor	of/to the fathers-in-law

- fråte (brother), fråţ (pl.)

Case	Istro-Romanian	Aromanian	Megleno-Romanian	Romanian	English
Nom/Acc sg.	fråtele	frate	frateli	fratele	the brother
Gen/Dat sg.	lu fråtele	a fratelui	lu frateli	al fratelui	of/to the brother
Nom/Acc pl.	fråţ	fratslji	fraţili	fraţii	the brothers
Gen/Dat pl.	lu fråţ	a fratslor	lu fraţilor	al fraţilor	of/to the brothers

The -a replaces -ĕ and -e, e.g. cåsĕ > cåsa (the house), nopte > nopta (the night); however a few feminine nouns ending in a stressed -e behave differently, e.g. ste > stevu (the star), ne > nevu (the snow).

- fetĕ (girl), fete (pl.)

Case	Istro-Romanian	Aromanian	Megleno-Romanian	Romanian	English
Nom/Acc sg.	feta	feata	feta	fata	the girl
Gen/Dat sg.	lu feta	a featiljei	lu feta	al fetei	of/to the girl

- muľerĕ (woman), muľere (pl.)

Case	Istro-Romanian	Aromanian	Megleno-Romanian	Romanian	English
Nom/Acc sg.	muľera	muljarea	muľiarea	muierea	the woman
Gen/Dat sg.	lu muľera	a muljariljei	lu muľiarea	al muierei	of/to the woman

- ste (star), stele (pl.)

Case	Istro-Romanian	Aromanian	Megleno-Romanian	Romanian	English
Nom/Acc sg.	stevu	steao	steua	steaua	the star
Gen/Dat sg.	lu stevu	a steaoljei	lu steua	al stelei	of/to the star
Nom/Acc pl.	stelele	steale	stelili	stelele	the stars
Gen/Dat pl.	lu stelele	a stealilor	lu stelilor	al stelelor	of/to the stars

Neuter nouns behave as masculine nouns in the singular and feminine in the plural.

- bråţ (arm), bråţe (pl.) – bråţu (the arm), bråţele (pl.)
- os (bone), ose (pl.) – osu (the bone), osele (pl.)
- zid (wall), zidur (pl.) – zidu (the wall), zidurle (pl.)
- plug (plough), plugur (pl.) – plugu (the plough), plugurle (pl.)

The forms of the adjectival article are ćela for the masculine and ćå for the feminine singular, and in the plural masculine ćeľ and feminine ćåle, e.g. ćela bur (the good one). The masculine indefinite article is un and feminine is o. The declension of the indefinite article has disappeared. Examples: un om (a man), un cå (a horse), o misĕ (a table), o båbĕ (an old woman).

=== Adjectives ===
Adjectives also have three genders, the masculine and feminine forms from the Latin, while the neuter form is of Slavic origin. E.g. bur, burĕ, buro (good). The comparative adjective is måi bur (better) and the superlative is ćel måi bur (the best).

The adjective may precede the noun: bura zi ((the) good day), which in itself can be made definite by the change of -ĕ to -a; or follows the noun: feta muşåtĕ (the beautiful girl).

=== Pronouns ===
Definite pronouns can be personal, possessive, demonstrative, relative and interrogative.
