= Alexandru Leca Morariu =

Austro-Hungarian-born Romanian scholar (1888–1963)

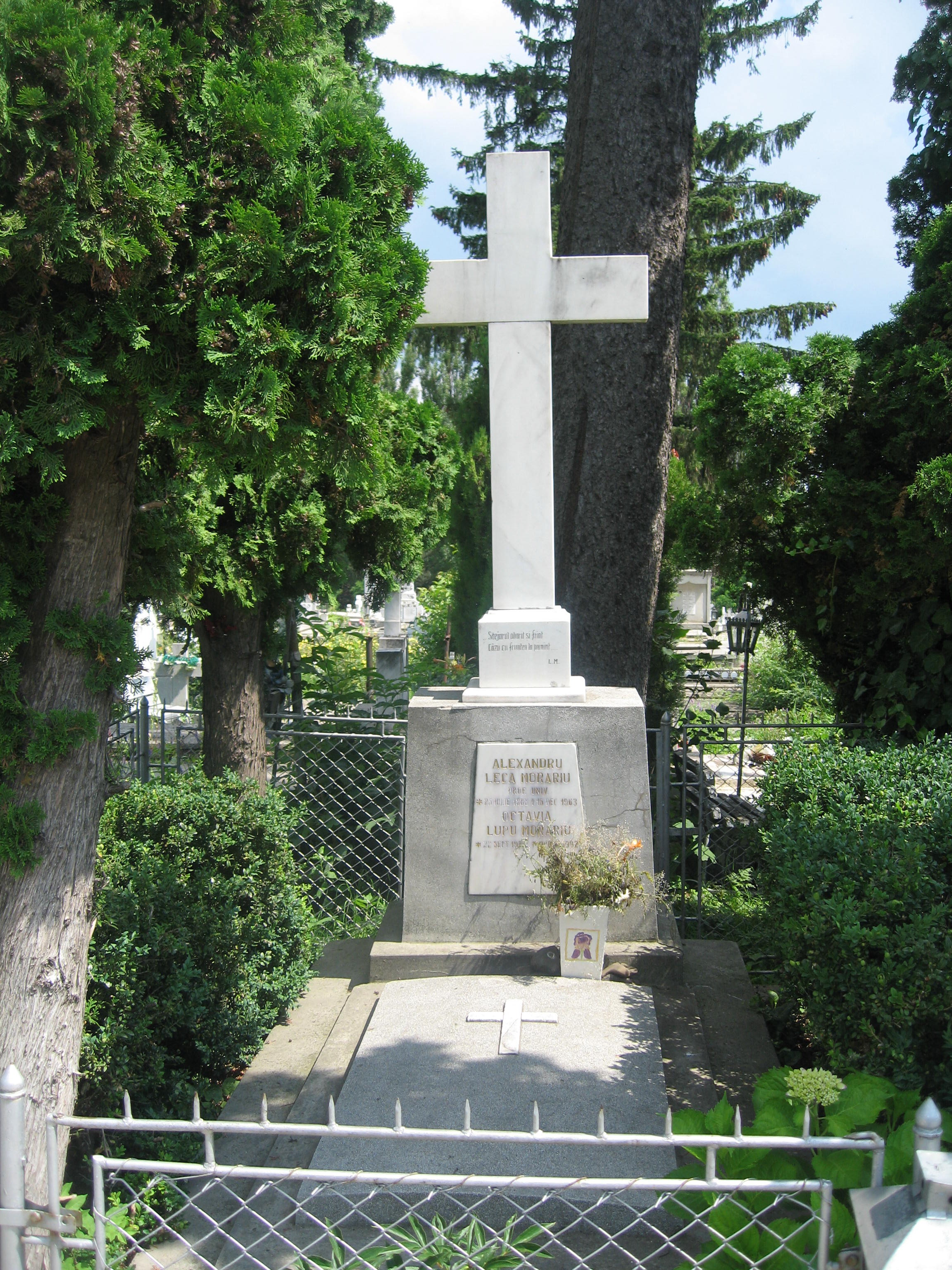
- The tomb of Morariu at Pacea Cemetery in Suceava, Romania
- Born: July 25, 1888; Cernăuți
- Died: December 15, 1963 (aged 75)
- Education: Czernowitz University

Alexandru Leca Morariu (July 25, 1888–December 15, 1963) was an Austro-Hungarian-born Romanian philologist, linguist, literary critic and historian, ethnologist, folklorist and musicologist.

== Life ==
Morariu was born in Cernăuți on July 25, 1888, to Orthodox priest Constantin Morariu and his wife Elena (née Popescu). From 1898 to 1906, he attended Suceava High School. From 1906 to 1911, he studied at the letters and philosophy faculty of Czernowitz University. He obtained a doctorate in letters from Cluj University in 1921, with a thesis on the morphology of Romanian predicate verbs. He taught at Gura Humorului in 1913-1914 and at Aron Pumnul High School in Cernăuți in 1919. He was an officer in the Austrian Army in World War I.

Morariu became a substitute professor at Cernăuți University in 1922, becoming a full professor in 1924 and remaining there until 1944. He was at the department of modern Romanian literature and folklore within the letters and philosophy faculty, where he was dean in 1936; he was also university vice-rector in 1936–1938. He was editing secretary at Junimea literară magazine in 1923–1925. He headed the Cernăuți National Theatre in 1933-1935 and the Institute of Literature, Philology, History, Ethnography and Folklore, which he founded, in 1940. From 1930 to 1934, he was president of the Armonia Musical Society. He founded several magazines: Făt-Frumos (1926-1944), Buletinul “Mihai Eminescu” (1930-1944), Fond și Formă (1938, 1944). In 1940, the Soviet occupation of Northern Bukovina forced him to flee to Bucharest. He returned to Cernăuți after Operation Barbarossa, but the reimposition of Soviet rule in 1944 led him to a self-imposed isolation in Râmnicu Vâlcea, where he died. He did not have a pension, and in 1947, the Romanian Communist Party-dominated government banned him from publishing. He incurred the authorities’ displeasure both as the son of a priest and the impassioned defender of his native region's Romanians.

== Interests ==
Morariu was interested in linguistics, philology, ethnology, dialectology, literary history and criticism, folklore, memoirs and musicology. He sometimes used the pen names L. M., L. Mărin and Al. Lupu. He promoted the idea of a national literature with the same aesthetic principles developed by critic Garabet Ibrăileanu, and highlighted the picturesque aspect of the Romanian language. He passionately conducted biographical research about Mihai Eminescu, Ion Creangă, Ciprian and Iraclie Porumbescu. He had a long-running interest in folklore, treating it as an autonomous discipline and demonstrating its organic links with erudite learning. He explored these ideas in the bulletin of the institute he founded.

Morariu studied the Istro-Romanian language, publishing articles about the life and customs of its speakers. He also wrote works of literary history and criticism, and published courses for students in these domains. In 1928, he won the Romanian Academy’s Prize for the works “Războiul Troadei” după Codicele C. Popovici, Institutorul Creangă and Drumuri moldovene. He won its Adamachi Prize in 1930. A great supporter of Romanian culture in Bukovina, he made sacrifices in order to ensure the prosperity of the societies he led. He could play several musical instruments, wrote music reviews and organized classical concerts. He was a knight of the Order of the Crown of Romania.
