= Vlad Cubreacov =

Moldovan politician

Member of the Moldovan Parliament
- In office 24 March 2005 – 22 April 2009
- Parliamentary group: Christian-Democratic People's Party
- In office 29 March 1994 – 21 April 1998
- Parliamentary group: Christian-Democratic People's Party

Personal details
- Born: 24 September 1965 (age 60) Crihana Veche, Moldavian SSR, Soviet Union
- Party: Christian-Democratic People's Party
- Other political affiliations: Popular Front of Moldova
- Education: Moldova State University
- Profession: Journalist

Vlad Cubreacov (born 24 September 1965) is a Moldovan politician.

== Biography ==
In 1989, he graduated from the journalism faculty of Moldova State University. He worked as a scientific consultant at the Dimitrie Cantemir Literature Museum in Chișinău (1989–1991), then becoming head of the Department of Religious Affairs in the Ministry of Culture and Religious Affairs (1991–1994). Since 1994 he has been a deputy in the Parliament of the Republic of Moldova, and since 1996 he has been a member of the Parliamentary Assembly of the Council of Europe (Committee on Culture, Science and Education). He represents the Metropolitan Church of Bessarabia at the European Court of Human Rights. Since 1999 he has served as vice-president of the Christian-Democratic People's Party (PPCD), and since April 2005 he has also been the leader of the Christian-democrat parliamentary group in the Parliament of the Republic of Moldova. He has been decorated with the Cross of the Patriarchate of Romania for laymen, the Cross of the Brotherhood of the Holy Grave of the Russian Federation, and the Distinction of merit of the Metropolitanate of Moldova and Bucovina.

Cubreacov is married.
