= Ethnic majority =

Numerical dominance of an ethnic group

An ethnic majority describes the numerical dominance of individuals of an ethnic group within the total population of a particular political or geographical entity. Ethnicity refers to genealogy, language, culture, identification with a historical social group and behavioral practices inherited from ancestors, among others, such as diet, art and religion.

An ethnic majority generally contrasts with ethnic minorities within a certain population, such as indigenous people, diasporas or immigrant ethnicities. The concept of the territorial national state is derived from the idea to unite and integrate ethnicities into independent nations. However, monoethnic countries are virtually non-existent. Modern people increasingly have multiple genealogical and ethnic roots. As a consequence, they often only loosely identify with distinct ethnic groups. Identification takes place within various multi-ethnic, societal and cultural categories .

In Anglo-Saxon countries, ethnicity as well as race are registered in official statistics, based on self-reported identification by the individual, for example in view to discover discrimination. In for example Scandinavian countries, no official statistics is kept on ethnicity or race. According to the European GDPR law, it is typically not allowed to register ethnicity or race.

In the context of genealogy, for example medical genetics or genealogical DNA tests, ethnicity is defined based on biological rather than cultural heritage. However, various genealogical DNA tests result in contradictory and insecure estimates of the ethnic mix of a person, since the result of each test depends on the reference group and how it is divided into ethnic groups. Thus, it is typically not possible to securely determine if a person belongs to the ethnic majority or not using genetic tests.

Ethnicity is sometimes confused with race, which however is defined based on heritage from a certain continent. The zoological meaning of race cannot be applied to humans since race can not be identified unambiguously from biological features such as skin color. It is disputed to what extent race can be identified using genetics.

== See also ==
- Majority
- Minority group
- Ethnicity
