= MEV Automobiles =

Start up electric vehicle manufacturer

MEV Automobiles Ltd is a British car company developing proposals for an all-electric city car.

== Products ==
MEV announced the BeeAnywhere in March 2020. It is a two-seat two-door small hatchback with graphene-based body panels.

Pre-production prototypes are being built in collaboration with the National Centre for Motorsport Engineering at the University of Bolton and the University of Manchester’s Graphene Engineering Innovation Centre. The BeeAnywhere is planned to cost £10,000.

== Company ==
MEV was founded by Tim Harper, a former European Space Agency engineer, and Dr Tony Keating from Keating Supercars. MEV stands for Manchester Electric Vehicles, and is based in Bolton.
