= August Kovačec =

- Born: 6 August 1938 (age 88); Donje Jesenje, Yugoslavia

Academic background
- Education: Faculty of Philosophy in Zagreb (PhD)
- Thesis: Opis današnjeg istrorumunjskog (1965)

Academic work
- Discipline: Linguist
- Institutions: Croatian Academy of Sciences and Arts

August Kovačec (born 6 August 1938) is a Croatian linguist and Romanicist.

== Biography ==
He was born in Donje Jesenje. He received a degree in Romance and Russian philology at the Faculty of Philosophy in Zagreb in 1960, and a PhD in 1965. From 1960 to 1962, he worked as Croatian language editor at the University of Bucharest. In 1962 he started working at the Department of Romance Languages at the Faculty of Philosophy in Zagreb, becoming professor in 1983. From 1966 to 1967 he went to Paris to further study under André Martinet and Émile Benveniste.

Since 1997, he has been a full member of the Croatian Academy of Sciences and Arts, and since 2011 a secretary of its Department of Philology.

His work is focused on the Istro-Romanian language (Opis današnjeg istrorumunjskog – Descrierea istroromânei actuale, 1971; Istrorumunjsko-hrvatski rječnik: (s gramatikom i tekstovima), 1998) as well as Jewish-Spanish spoken in Dubrovnik and Sarajevo and their contacts with Croatian. He published papers on French language, Romance comparative syntax, on Balkans languages and Romance literatures (Francuska književnost XIV. do XVI. st., Rumunjska književnost, in: Povijest svjetske književnosti, book 3, 1982). At the Miroslav Krleža Lexicographical Institute he was the Editor-in-Chief of the Croatian General Lexicon (1991–1996), then deputy editor (1996–2001) and finally the Editor-in-Chief of Croatian Encyclopedia (2001–2005). His articles on Croatian language policy meet criticism, arising from Kovačec's puristic approach to language and the primordialist view of nations.
