= Istro-Romanian language =

Romance language of the Balkans

Istro-Romanian
- vlåški, žejånski
- Native to: Croatia
- Region: Istria
- Ethnicity: Istro-Romanians
- Native speakers: 300 (2007); L2 speakers: 1,100 (2007)
- Language family: Indo-European: Italic; Latino-Faliscan; Latin; Romance; Eastern Romance; Northern Romanian? (Note: The internal classification of the Eastern Romance languages presented in Petrucci (1999) proposes a bipartite split into Northern and Southern branches, with the Northern branch splitting into Istro-Romanian and Daco-Romanian. By contrast, the classification presented within Glottolog v4.8 proposes a bipartite split between Aromanian and Northern Romanian, the latter of which is further split into Istro-Romanian and Eastern Romanian, from which Daco-Romanian and Megleno-Romanian are hypothesized to have split.); Istro-Romanian
- Early forms: Old Latin: Vulgar Latin; Proto-Romance; Common Romanian

Language codes
- ISO 639-3: ruo
- Glottolog: istr1245
- ELP: Istro Romanian
- Linguasphere: (varieties: 51-AAD-aa to -ab) 51-AAD-a (varieties: 51-AAD-aa to -ab)
- Istro-Romanian is classified as Severely Endangered by the UNESCO Atlas of the World's Languages in Danger.

The Istro-Romanian language (vlåški, žejånski) is an Eastern Romance language, spoken in a few villages and hamlets in the peninsula of Istria in Croatia, as well as in the diaspora of this people. It is sometimes abbreviated to IR.

While its speakers call themselves Rumeri, Rumeni, they are also known as Vlachs, Rumunski, Ćići and Ćiribiri. The last one, used by ethnic Croats, originated as a disparaging nickname for the language, rather than its speakers.

Due to the fact that its speakers are estimated to be fewer than 500, it is listed among languages that are "severely endangered" in the UNESCO Atlas of the World's Languages in Danger.

It is also considered by some Romanian scholars to be an idiosyncratic offshoot dialect of Romanian.

== Recent history ==
The Istro-Romanians have faced many significant challenges in preserving their language, culture and ethnic identity, including emigration from communism and migration to nearby cities and towns after World War II, when a peace treaty of February 10, 1947, transferred Istria from Italy (which had held it since World War I) and awarded it to Yugoslavia, the parent country of present-day Croatia and Slovenia, which divided Istria between themselves, while Italy still retained a small portion near Trieste.

Before the 20th century, Istro-Romanian was spoken in a substantially broader part of northeastern Istria surrounding the Ćićarija mountain range (ancient Mons Carusadius). The Istro-Romanians now comprise two groups: the Ćići around Žejane (denoting the people on the north side of Mt. Učka) and the Vlahi around Šušnjevica (denoting the people on the south side of Mt. Učka (Monte Maggiore). However, apart from borrowings from other languages which vary from village to village, their language is linguistically identical.

Several hundred native speakers live in the United States—not only in Queens, New York (as has been mistakenly believed by some), but throughout the five boroughs of New York City, as well as in upstate New York and the neighboring states of New Jersey and Connecticut. Native speakers also still live in California. Further groups of native speakers reside in Italy, Canada, Sweden and Australia.

The number of Istro-Romanian speakers has been reduced by their assimilation into other linguistic groups that were either already present or introduced by their respective new rulers of Istria: in the 1921 Italian census, there were 1,644 declared Istro-Romanian speakers in the area, while in 1926, Romanian scholar Sextil Pușcariu estimated their number to be closer to 3,000. Studies conducted in Istria in 1998 (?) by the Croatian linguist August Kovačec revealed only 170 active speakers (but those counted presumably are only those still in villages where the language is actively spoken, thereby excluding those who moved to larger towns in Istria), most of them being bilingual (or trilingual), except for 27 children.

On the other hand, the major northern village Žejane and nearby hamlets at the Slovenian border are less Italianized and more Slavicized. Many villages in the area have names that are of Romanian origin, such as Jeian, Buzet ("lips"), Katun ("hamlet"), Letaj, Sucodru ("under a forest"), Costirceanu (a Romanian name). Some of these names are official (recognized by Croatia as their only names), while others are used only by Istro-Romanian speakers (ex. Nova Vas|Noselo).

== Origin ==
Some loanwords suggest that before coming to Istria, Istro-Romanians lived for a period of time on the Dalmatian coast near the Dinara and Velebit mountains.

August Kovačec (1998) hypothesizes that the Istro-Romanians migrated to their present region about 600 years ago from the territory of present-day Romania, after the bubonic plague depopulated Istria. This hypothesis is based on chronicles of the Frankopan princes that state that in the 15th century they accepted the migrating Vlachs from the nearby mainland and from the northern part of Krk (Veglia) island, and settled them in isolated villages in Poljica and Dubašnica, between the castles of Dobrinj and Omišalj, and in the port of Malinska. The term "Vlach", however, refers to all Eastern-Romance-language speakers and cannot be associated exclusively with Istro-Romanians. In fact, pockets of Romanian-language speakers persisted in Malinska up to the mid-19th century, they gradually assimilated and their language disappeared with the last speaker, Mate Bajčić Gašparović. Today, few Romance-language toponyms remain in Malinska.

== Phonology ==
=== Consonants ===
		Labial	Dental/ Alveolar	Palatal	Velar	Glottal
Nasal		m	n	ɲ		
Stop	voiceless	p	t	c	k	
Stop	voiced	b	d		ɡ	
Affricate	voiceless		t͡s	t͡ʃ		
Affricate	voiced			(d͡ʒ)		
Fricative	voiceless	f	s	ʃ	x	(h)
Fricative	voiced	v	z	ʒ	(ɣ)	
Trill			r			
Approximant	lateral		l	ʎ		
Approximant	median			j		

- Sounds /ɡ, x/ can also be realized as [ɣ, h] in some dialects or positions.
- /d͡ʒ/ only occurs marginally, or from loanwords.

=== Vowels ===
	Front	Central	Back
Close	i		u
Close-mid	e	ə	o
Open-mid	ɛ	ə	ɔ
Open		a	

- Sounds /ɛ, ɔ/ can also be heard as lower [æ, ɒ] in other dialects.

== Lexis ==
Although it is a Romance language, Istro-Romanian has received a great amount of influence from other languages. According to a 2005 analysis, 50% of the words in Istro-Romanian come from Serbo-Croatian, 16% come from either Serbo-Croatian or Slovene, 3% come from Slovene, 4.7% come from Italian/Venetian, 3.5% come from Old Church Slavonic and only 25% come from Latin.

Another study made in 2009 found that 647 words are inherited from Latin (compared to about 2,000 words inherited from Latin in most Romance languages), and 25 words are from the substrate, a much smaller number compared to Daco-Romanian which preserved 89 words from the substrate. The situation is typical for isolated languages/dialects with lower number of speakers. Even so, Istro-Romanian has managed to preserve a few words from Latin that are not found in other Eastern Romance languages: gåbu "yellow" (<galbus; also present in Romanian as galben), ånča "here" (<hac+ce), oča (<hac/hocce+a), iențå (<*hic‑ce+a), iuva "where".

== See also ==
- Istro-Romanians
- Istro-Romanian alphabet
- Istro-Romanian grammar
- Megleno-Romanian language
- Common Romanian
- Substrate in Romanian
- Balkan sprachbund
- Origin of the Romanians
- Thraco-Roman
- Daco-Roman
- Eastern Romance languages
- Romance languages
- Legacy of the Roman Empire
- Istriot language

== Bibliography ==
- Dahmen, Wolfgang (1989). "Istrorumänisch". Lexikon der romanistischen Linguistik (in German). Vol. 3. Tübingen: Max Niemeyer. pp. 448–460.
- Feresini, Nerina (1996). Il Comune istro-romeno di Valdarsa (in Italian). Trieste: Edizioni Italo Svevo.
- Frățilă, Vasile (2003). "La terminologia del corpo nel dialetto istroromen". In Sánchez Miret, Fernando (ed.). Actas del XXIII Congreso internacional de lingüística y filología románica, vol. 3, Sección 4: Semántica léxica, lexicología y onomásticao. Tübingen: Max Niemeyer. pp. 169–180. doi:10.1515/9783110929317-018. ISBN 9783484503977.
- Kovačec, August (1998). Istrorumunjsko-hrvatski rječnik s gramatikom i tekstovima (Glosar istroroman-croat cu gramatica si texte). Verba moritura vol. I (in Croatian). Pula: Mediteran. p. 378. ISBN 953-96986-1-8.
- Popovici, Josif (1909). Dialectele romîne din Istria (in Romanian). Halle.
- Tekavčić, Pavao (1959). "Due voci romene in un dialetto serbo-croato dell'Isola di Veglia (Krk)". Studia Romanica (in Italian). 7: 35–38.
- Vrzić, Zvjezdana; Doričić, Robert (2014). "Language Contact and Stability of Basic Vocabulary: Croatian Loanwords for Body Parts in Vlashki/Zheyanski (Istro-Romanian)". Fluminensia. 26 (2): 105–122.
- Vrzić, Zvjezdana; Singler, John Victor (2016). "Identity and Language Shift Among Vlashki/Zheyanski Speakers in Croatia". In Ferreira, Vera; Bouda, Peter (eds.). Language Documentation and Conservation in Europe. Language Documentation & Conservation Special Publication No. 9. Honolulu: University of Hawai'i Press. pp. 51–68. hdl:10125/24659. ISBN 978-0-9856211-5-5.
- Petrucci, Peter R. (1999). Slavic Features in the History of Rumanian. München: LINCOM Europa. ISBN 38-9586-599-0.
