= Province of Pola =

Former Italian province (1923–1947)

Province of Pola Provincia di Pola
- Province of the Kingdom of Italy
- 18 January 1923–10 February 1947
- Coat of arms

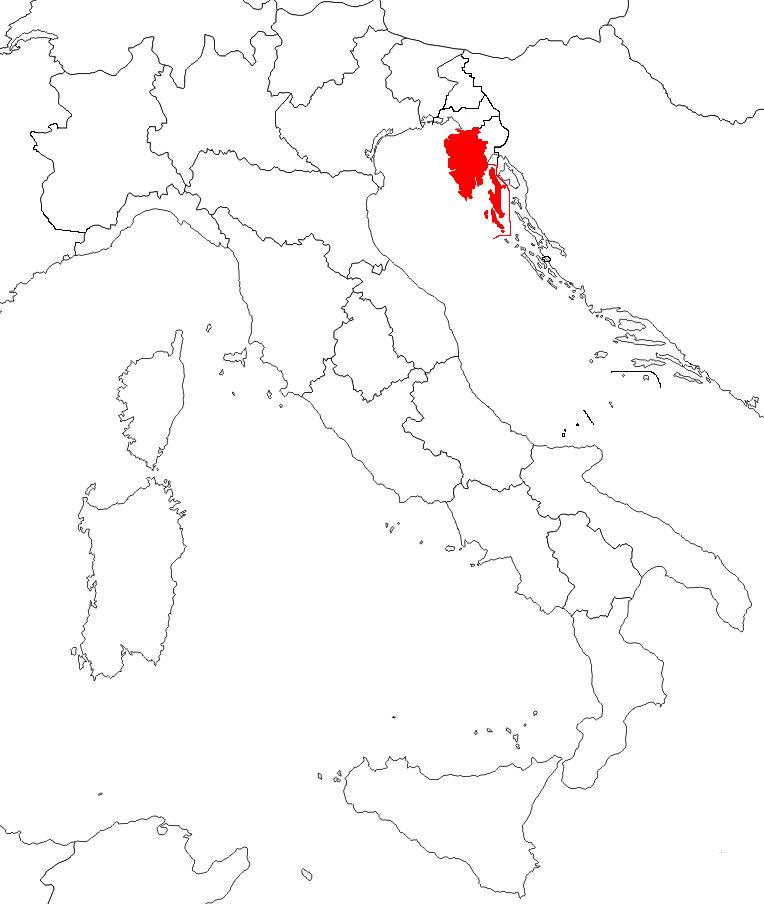
- Location of the Province of Pola (red) in the Kingdom of Italy.
- Capital: Pola
- Area
  - 1936: 3,718 km^{2} (1,436 sq mi)
- Population
  - 1936: 294,492
- Historical era: Interbellum · World War II
  - Established: 18 January 1923
  - Invasion of Yugoslavia: 6–17 April 1941
  - Paris Peace Treaty: 10 February 1947
Preceded by	Succeeded by
Margraviate of Istria	Istria County; Free Territory of Trieste
- Today part of: Croatia and Slovenia

The Province of Pola (Italian: Provincia di Pola), also known as the Province of Istria (Italian: Provincia dell'Istria), was a province of the Kingdom of Italy created after World War I, that officially existed from 1923 until 1947. The capital (capoluogo in Italian) was Pola. After the Second World War the province of Pola became part of Yugoslavia. Following the collapse of Yugoslavia in 1991, the province of Pola has been part of Croatia and Slovenia.

== Demographics ==
The province of Pola was divided in 1938 into 42 comuni (municipalities) and had an area of 3,718 square kilometres, with a population of 294,492 inhabitants (population density being 80 inhabitants per square kilometre). It was located in the peninsula of Istria.

The 1921 Italian Census showed that in the province there were 199,942 Italians (67%) and 90,262 Croats (23%), with 9% of Slovenians and Austrians, most of them former employees of the Habsburg empire. The population of the city of Pola consisted of 41,125 Italians (91%) and 5,420 Croats (9%). In the province there was a small community of Istro-Romanians, centered around the Valdarsa area in central Istria.

Nearly 96% of the population was Catholic and they were members of the Roman Catholic Diocese of Parenzo and Pola, in those years within the ecclesiastical province of Arcidiocesi di Gorizia.

== History ==
The province of Pola was established in January 1923 with royal decree no. 53, after Italy's victory in World War I and the subsequent annexation of Istria to the Kingdom of Italy. It consisted of the former Margraviate of Istria of the dissolved Austro-Hungarian Empire, as well as the islands of Cherso and Lussino in the Kvarner Gulf.

Originally, the province comprised sixty municipalities, the entirety of Istria save for Muggia and a few other small municipalities in the far northwest, which were part of the province of Trieste; in 1924, however, several municipalities in the northeastern part of Istria were separated to become part of the newly established province of Fiume.

Pola became the capital of the newly created province. After World War I, the city's population declined due to economic difficulties caused by the withdrawal of Austro-Hungarian military and bureaucratic facilities and the dismissal of workers from the shipyard; under the Italian Fascist government of Benito Mussolini, non-Italians, especially Slavic residents, faced a political and cultural repression, and some fled the city of Pola and Istria altogether.

In the 1930s, the province of Pola enjoyed an economic revival owing to coal mining in Valdarsa) and infrastructure investments. State Road 15 (Via Flavia), linking Trieste to Pola, was enlarged; the railways (Ferrovia Istriana, linking Divaccia to Pola) were improved, as were the water facilities, with the construction of the new Acquedotto Istriano. The port and shipyard of Pola were also improved with modern military facilities, while an airport was built in the same area. In 1935 the Ferrovia Parenzana, an old narrow gauge railway, was closed. New shipping lines from Istria were created, mainly towards Trieste, Venice and Ancona; a weekly service that connected all the minor ports of Istria from Trieste to Pola and to Fiume was also created. From 1935, Adriatica di Navigazione connected Pola with Zara and Ancona with large and modern ships. Tourism was also promoted, mainly to the Roman ruins of Pola; in 1938 Istria had 129,838 foreign visitors.

After the collapse of Fascist Italy in September 1943, the city and the province fell into a state of anarchy in which the first wave of the Foibe massacres were carried out against elements of the Italian community, especially members of the Fascist Party and employees of the Italian state. Istria was then occupied by the German Army and became part of the Operational Zone of the Adriatic Littoral, being subjected to repeated Allied air raids. In the last phase of the war, Pola and the province saw arrests, deportations and executions of people suspected of aiding Tito's partisans; the entirety of the province was occupied by the Yugoslav People's Liberation Army in May 1945, after which a new wave of killings targeting suspected Fascists and Italians who opposed annexation to Yugoslavia followed. This triggered the flight of most of Istria's Italian population in the Istrian exodus.

The 1947 Paris peace treaty with Italy gave all of the former Province of Pola to Yugoslavia, except for eleven municipalities in northwestern Istria (including Capodistria), which became Zone B of the Free Territory of Trieste, also under Yugoslav administration. In 1954, following the Memorandum of London which ended the brief life of the Free Territory of Trieste, Zone B was de facto annexated by Yugoslavia, a move which was formalized in the 1975 Treaty of Osimo between Italy and Yugoslavia. Today, the territory of the former province of Pola is divided between Croatia (the majority) and Slovenia.

The provincial marking on the vehicle registration plate was PL.

== Municipalities ==
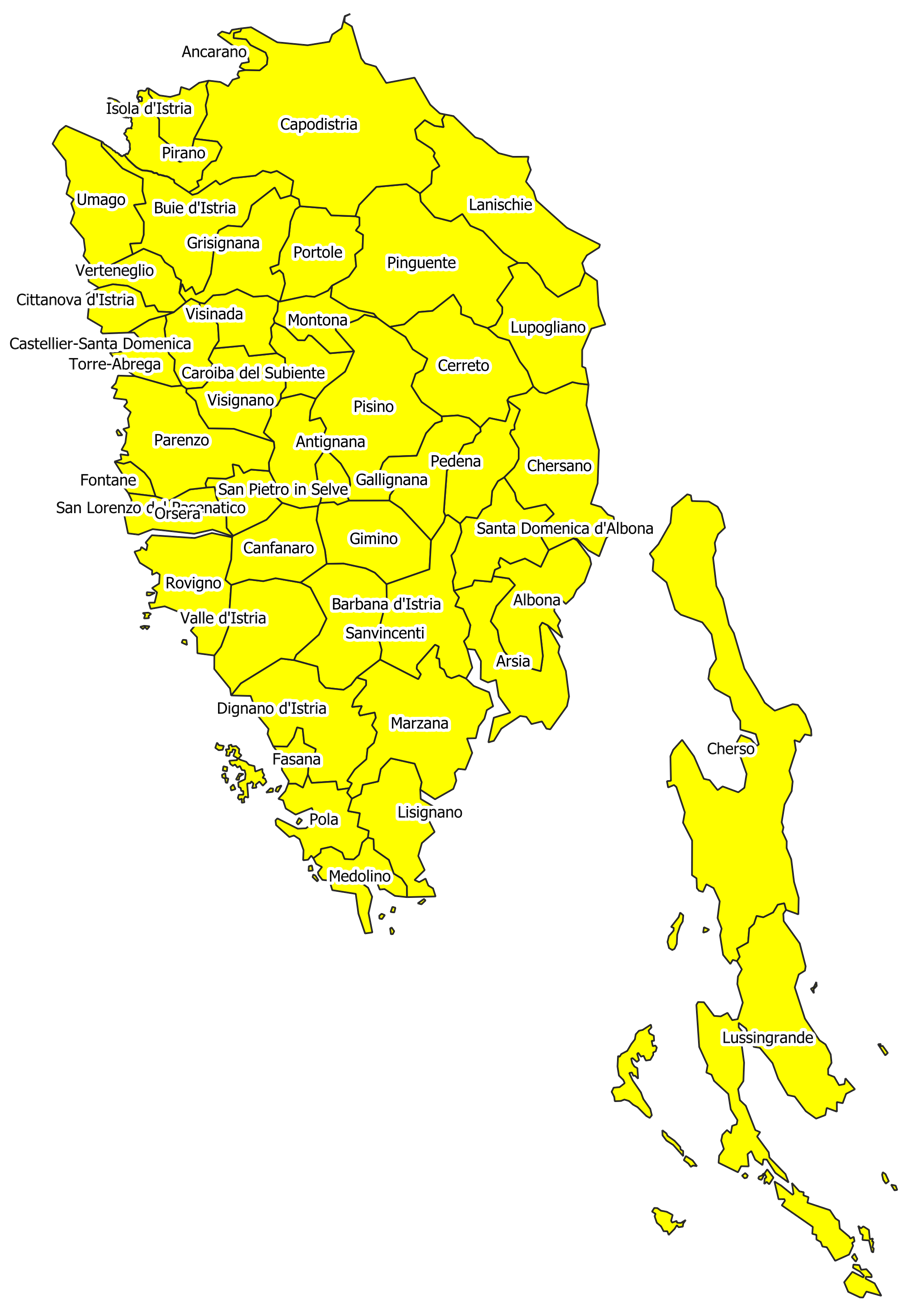
Municipalities of the province of Pola

The forty-two municipalities that comprised the province of Pola after 1923 were:

- Albona (present-day Labin in Croatia)
- Antignana (present-day Tinjan in Croatia)
- Arsia (present-day Raša in Croatia)
- Barbana (present-day Barban in Croatia)
- Bogliuno (present-day Boljun in Croatia, part of the municipality of Lupoglav)
- Brioni Maggiore (present-day Veli Brijun in Croatia, part of the municipality of Pula)
- Buie (present-day Buje in Croatia)
- Canfanaro (present-day Kanfanar in Croatia)
- Capodistria (present-day Koper in Slovenia)
- Cherso (present-day Cres in Croatia)
- Cittanova d'Istria (present-day Novigrad in Croatia)
- Dignano d'Istria (present-day Vodnjan in Croatia)
- Erpelle-Corina (present-day Hrpelje-Kozina in Slovenia)
- Fianona (present-day Plomin in Croatia, part of the municipality of Kršan)
- Gimino (present-day Žminj in Croatia)
- Grisignana (present-day Grožnjan in Croatia)
- Isola d'Istria (present-day Izola in Slovenia)
- Lussingrande (present-day Veli Lošinj in Croatia, part of the municipality Mali Lošinj)
- Lussinpiccolo (present-day Mali Lošinj in Croatia)
- Maresego (present-day Marezige in Slovenia, part of the municipality of Koper)
- Montona (present-day Motovun in Croatia)
- Neresine (present-day Nerezine in Croatia, part of the municipality Mali Lošinj)
- Orsera (present-day Vrsar in Croatia)
- Ossero (present-day Osor in Croatia, part of the municipality of Mali Lošinj)
- Parenzo (present-day Poreč in Croatia)
- Monte di Capodistria (present day Šmarje in Slovenia, part of the municipality Koper)
- Pinguente (present-day Buzet in Croatia)
- Pirano (present-day Piran in Slovenia)
- Pisino (present-day Pazin in Croatia)
- Pola (present-day Pula in Croatia)
- Portole (present-day Oprtalj in Croatia)
- Rovigno d'Istria (present-day Rovinj in Croatia)
- Rozzo (present-day Roč in Croatia, part of the municipality of Buzet)
- Sanvincenti (present-day Svetvinčenat in Croatia)
- Lanischie (present-day Lanišće in Croatia)
- Umago (present-day Umag in Croatia)
- Valdarsa (present-day Šušnjevica in Croatia, part of the municipality of Krsan)
- Valle d'Istria (present-day Bale in Croatia)
- Verteneglio (present-day Brtonigla in Croatia)
- Villa Decani (present-day Dekani in Slovenia, part of the municipality of Koper)
- Visignano d'Istria (present-day Višnjan in Croatia)
- Visinada (present-day Vižinada in Croatia)

According to the 1936 Italian census, Pola was the largest town in the province, with a population of 46,259, followed by Pisino, with 19,094 inhabitans, Albona, with 16,973 inhabitants, and Pirano, with 15,117. Other important towns were Parenzo (12,036 inhabitants), Capodistria (11,995), Dignano d'Istria (11,265), Pinguente (10,222), and Rovigno (10,028).

The municipality of Neresine, previously a hamlet of Ossero, was established in 1924, and the municipality of Brioni Maggiore, previously part of Pola, was established in 1934; this was also the least populated municipality in the province, with just 310 inhabitants in 1936. Arsia was the youngest municipality in the province, having been established in 1937 in territory that had previously belonged to Albona; it was a Fascist new town, built on recently reclaimed land to house the workers of the nearby coal mines and their families. Another municipality, Draguccio (Draguć), was abolished in 1928, and became part of Pisino (it is now part of Cerovlje).

== Geography ==
Encompassing most of Istria, the province was crossed by three main rivers: Quieto (Mirna in Croatian), the longest (53 km), flowing from inner Istria (near Pinguente) to Cittanova; Dragogna (Dragonja), more to the north, flowing from the Šavrin hills to the Gulf of Pirano, thirty kilometres long; and Arsa (Raša), 23 kilometres long, in southeastern Istria, from near Pićan to Arsia.

The highest mountains in the region were the Ćićarija heights in the northeast, called Monti della Vena in Italian, with the highest point in the province being Učka, called Monte Maggiore in Italian, 1,396 meters above sea level.

Besides most of the Istrian peninsula, the province included the Brioni islands, west of Pola, and the islands of Cherso, Lussino, Unie (Unije), Sansego (Susak), Asinello (Ilovik) and Levrera (Zeča) in the Kvarner Gulf.

The only natural lake in Istria, Lake Čepić (Lago d'Arsa in Italian), was drained in 1932 to reclaim the land for agriculture.

== See also ==
- Provinces of Italy
- Province of Fiume
- Province of Trieste
- Catholic Diocese of Pola

== Bibliography ==
- Cresswell, Peterjon; Atkins, Ismay; Dunn, Lily (2006). Time Out Croatia. London: Ebury Publishing, Random House. ISBN 978-1-904978-70-1.
- Gombač, Boris (2007). Atlante storico dell'Adriatico orientale (in Italian). Pontedera: Bandecchi & Vivaldi Editori.
