= Polje Čepić =

Polje Čepić Cepich
- Village
- Location within Croatia
- Coordinates: 45°11′58″N 14°07′49″E
- Country: Croatia
- County: Istria County
- Municipality: Kršan

Area
  - Total: 2.3 sq mi (5.9 km^{2})
- Elevation: 130 ft (40 m)

Population (2021)
  - Total: 126
  - Density: 55/sq mi (21/km^{2})
- Time zone: UTC+1 (CET)
  - Summer (DST): UTC+2 (CEST)
- Postal code: 52232 Kršan
- Area code: 052

Polje Čepić or Čepić (Italian: Cepich, Felicia, German: Tschepitsch, Pitsch), is a village in Istria County, Croatia, in the municipality of Kršan.

== Description ==
It is located in the eastern part of Istria, on the western slopes of mountain Učka along the Čepić field, on the state road D500, 1.3 km south from neighboring village Purgarija Čepić, and 5.8 km north east from the municipal center Kršan (D64).

== History ==
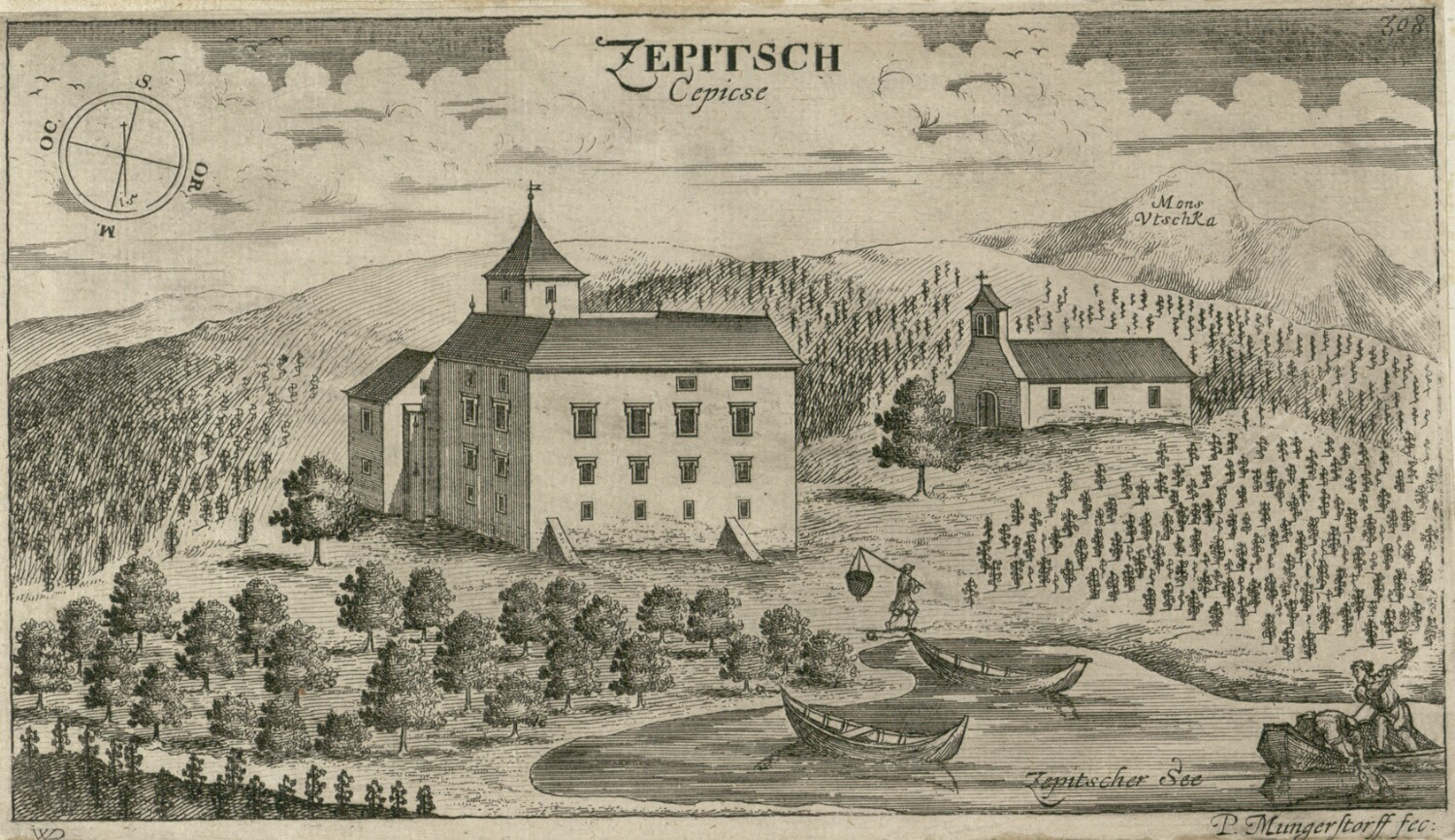
Čepić in an engraving from 1679.

The village territory was first mentioned in 1102 at the time of Patriarchate of Aquileia in the grant by Ulric II to the Aquileia patriarchs, as part of Kožljak castle estate. In 1287 was founded Paulist monastery of St. Mary (also called the Monastery of Our Lady of the Lake). In 1385, the Kožljak lord Filip Gutenegg richly endowed the monastery. In 1606 the monastery is mentioned as župa (parish). In 1783 the monastery was disbanded and the property was sold out to Johann Weikhard from Auersperg noble family. The tombstone with Glagolitic inscription of Kožljak lord Martin Moysevich (1492), which was in the monastery, was relocated to castle chapel in Belaj.

In the hamlet Kloštar was sacral, while in Purgarija profane part of Čepić. The Purgarija was called according to the German word Bürger (citizen), and the former Burg (Engl. Castle). The castle was devastated in the Uskok War (1615-1617), but it was rebuilt. Although the last remains of the ruins were removed at the time of lake drying in 1930, he can be seen in Valvasor engraving from 1679, when was in Auersperg family property.

Inhabitants mainly live from agriculture on fertile field that was created by drying of Lake Čepić in 1930. Before also from lake fishery.

== Demographics ==
According to the 2021 census, its population was 126. It was 148 in 2011.

Population number according census
1857	1869	1880	1890	1900	1910	1921	1931	1948	1953	1961	1971	1981	1991	2001	2011
0	0	253	221	241	274	0	0	319	411	341	289	304	257	168	148

Note: The data in 1857, 1869, 1921, 1931 and partially in 1880 and 1890, are contained in neighboring village Purgarija Čepić. Named as Polje-Čepić from 1948 until 1971.
