= Kostrčani =

Kostrčani Costârceån
- Village
- Location within Croatia
- Coordinates: 45°14′6.8″N 14°8′14.2″E
- Country: Croatia
- County: Istria County
- Municipality: Kršan

Area
  - Total: 2.4 sq mi (6.2 km^{2})

Population (2021)
  - Total: 21
  - Density: 8.8/sq mi (3.4/km^{2})
- Time zone: UTC+1 (CET)
  - Summer (DST): UTC+2 (CEST)
- Postal code: 52233 Šušnjevica
- Area code: 052

Kostrčani (Istro-Romanian: Costârceån, Italian: Costerciani) is a village in Istria County, Croatia. Administratively it belongs to municipality of Kršan. The village is inhabited mostly by Istro-Romanians.

== Location ==
It is located on the North Eastern part of Istria, 20 km North from Labin, and 11 km from the centre of the municipality Kršan. It is west from the junction point of A8 motorway, and roads number D64 and D500, at the North Western edge of field Čepić.

== Demographics ==
According to the 2021 census, its population was 21. It was 48 in 2011.

Population number according to the census
1857	1869	1880	1890	1900	1910	1921	1931	1948	1953	1961	1971	1981	1991	2001	2011	2021
644	601	433	407	435	445	655	599	320	261	230	142	71	54	42	30	21
