= Jesenovik =

Jesenovik Sucodru
- Village
- Location within Croatia
- Coordinates: 45°13′51″N 14°10′23″E
- Country: Croatia
- County: Istria County
- Municipality: Kršan

Area
  - Total: 5.1 sq mi (13.1 km^{2})
- Elevation: 260 ft (80 m)

Population (2021)
  - Total: 42
  - Density: 8.3/sq mi (3.2/km^{2})
- Time zone: UTC+1 (CET)
  - Summer (DST): UTC+2 (CEST)
- Postal code: 52233 Šušnjevica
- Area code: 052

Jesenovik (Istro-Romanian: Sucodru; Italian: Iessenoviza or Santa Maria del Lago) is a small village in Istria, Croatia, in the municipality of Kršan. The village is inhabited mostly by Istro-Romanians.

== Description ==
The village is located close to the local road Šušnjevica - Plomin and the railroad Šušnjevica - Labin, at the former Lake Čepić, now a field, on the Western slopes of Učka, below the Brgud peak, with an elevation of 80 metres.

== Demographics ==
According to the 2021 census, its population was 42. It was 57 in 2011.

Population number according to the census
1857	1869	1880	1890	1900	1910	1921	1931	1948	1953	1961	1971	1981	1991	2001	2011	2021
245	242	271	280	277	280	250	237	227	217	155	106	92	80	59	57	42
