= Lake Čepić =

Coordinates: 45°12′32″N 14°9′36″E

- Čepićko jezero (Croatian); Lago d'Arsa (Italian)
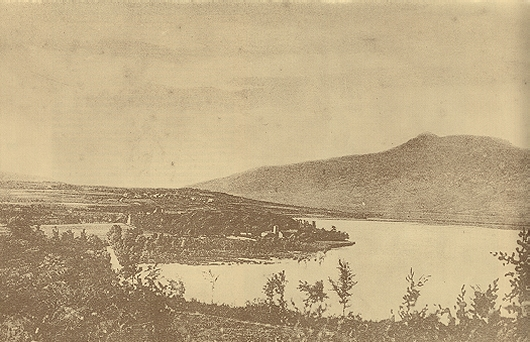
- Lake Čepić in the early 20th century

- Location within Pula Rijeka Sibenik Location within Croatia
- Interactive map of Lake Čepić
- Location: Istria, Croatia
- Type: Former lake
- Max. length: 4 km (2.5 mi)
- Max. width: 2.5 km (1.6 mi)
- Surface area: 5.4–8.6 km^{2} (2.1–3.3 sq mi)
- Max. depth: 1–2.5 km (0.62–1.55 mi)
- Water volume: 20×10^{6} m^{3} (710×10^{6} cu ft)

Lake Čepić (Croatian: Čepićko jezero, Raško, Kožljansko, Sisolsko, Italian: Lago d'Arsa) was the only natural lake in Istria, Croatia. It was drained in 1932 with a 4,560 m (3 mi) long tunnel near Plomin to the sea. The surface of the vast green valley was transformed into a fertile field for agriculture. The field's area is around 7 km^{2} (2.7 sq mi) (elevation 24 m (79 ft)), and the Boljunčica River flows into it, while from it Raša River.

== History ==
The lake was located in eastern Istria, on the western and south-western slopes of Mount Učka (to the west of uplift Sisol, elevation 833 m (2,733 ft)). South of the lake (now filled) is the town Kršan, to the east the ruins of Kožljak Castle, while to the west and north was the Pauline monastery of St. Mary, and the villages of Čepić, Kostrčani, Brdo Jesenovik, Nova Vas, and Šušnjevica, mostly inhabited by Istro-Romanians.

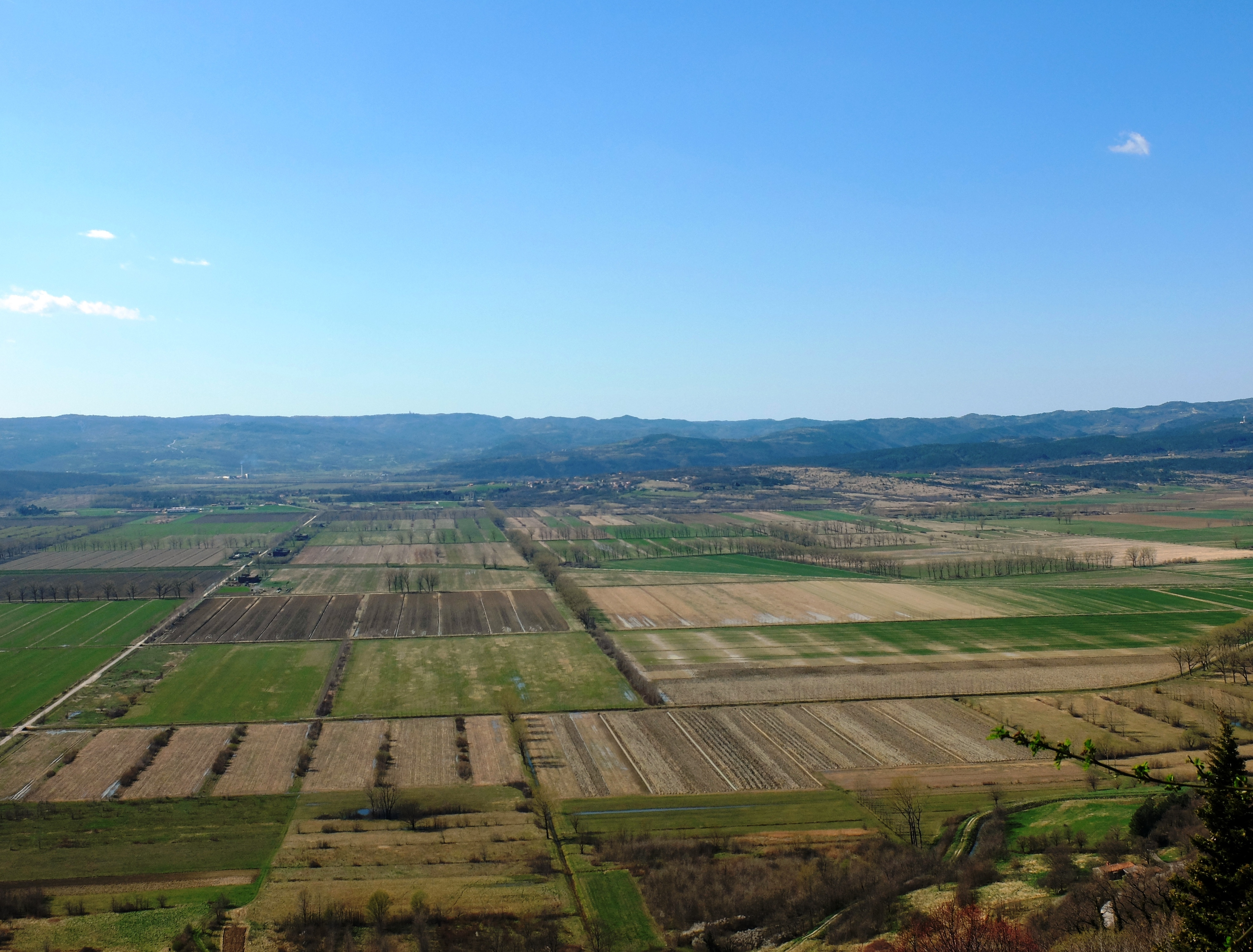
Čepić field seen from Kožljak

The lake's area was between 5.4–8.6 km^{2} (2.1–3.3 sq mi), depending on the precipitation and the water supply from the Boljunčica River. Its width was 2.5 kilometres (1.6 mi) at most, while its length was nearly 4 kilometres (2.5 mi). The depth of the lake was between 1 metre (3 ft 3 in) and no more than 2.5 metres (8 ft 2 in). The lake was covered with reed and sedge, and was rich in fish (eel, carp, chub), and birds (wild duck, white stork, swan). However, it was also known for malarial mosquitoes and flooding.

The lake was recorded in the old topographic maps, the oldest from 1525 and 1563. In 1679 by Valvasor engravings as Zhepizer See, later as Sisol lake, and Gessaro in 1753. The first documents about lake drainage dates to the end of 18th century by Austria and Venice. In 1898, during the rule of Austria, a project was developed to halve the lake surface to around 300 hectares (740 acres). In 1899 it was accepted by Istrian parliament, and the work began in 1902, but was stopped in 1908 due to lack of financial support. When Istria came under the rule of Italy in 1918, a consortium was established in 1920 for regulating the course of the Raša River, Conzorzio di Bonifica del Sistema dell' Arsa, and the work on the new project began in 1928.

The tunnel, which extended from the southern point of the lake to the Gulf of Plomin, was 4,560 metres (14,960 ft) long, built by between 96 and 262 workers per year, and was finished after four years in October 1932. The dam was opened on 11 December of the same year, and the water reached the gulf in 26 minutes. By January 1933, the lake water, totaling 20 million cubic metres, had drained almost completely.

== Gallery ==
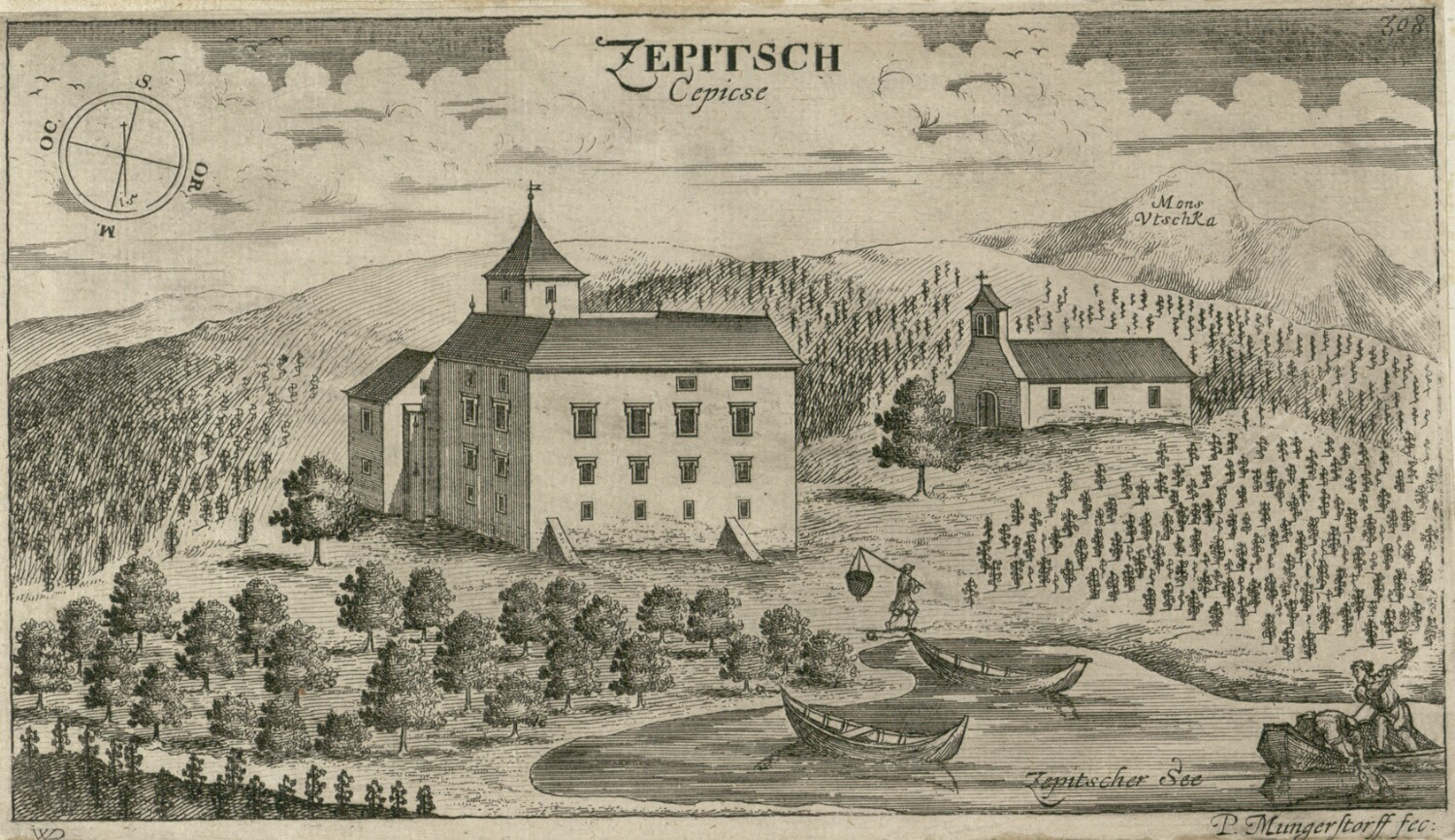
Čepić, with boats and fishermen on the lake

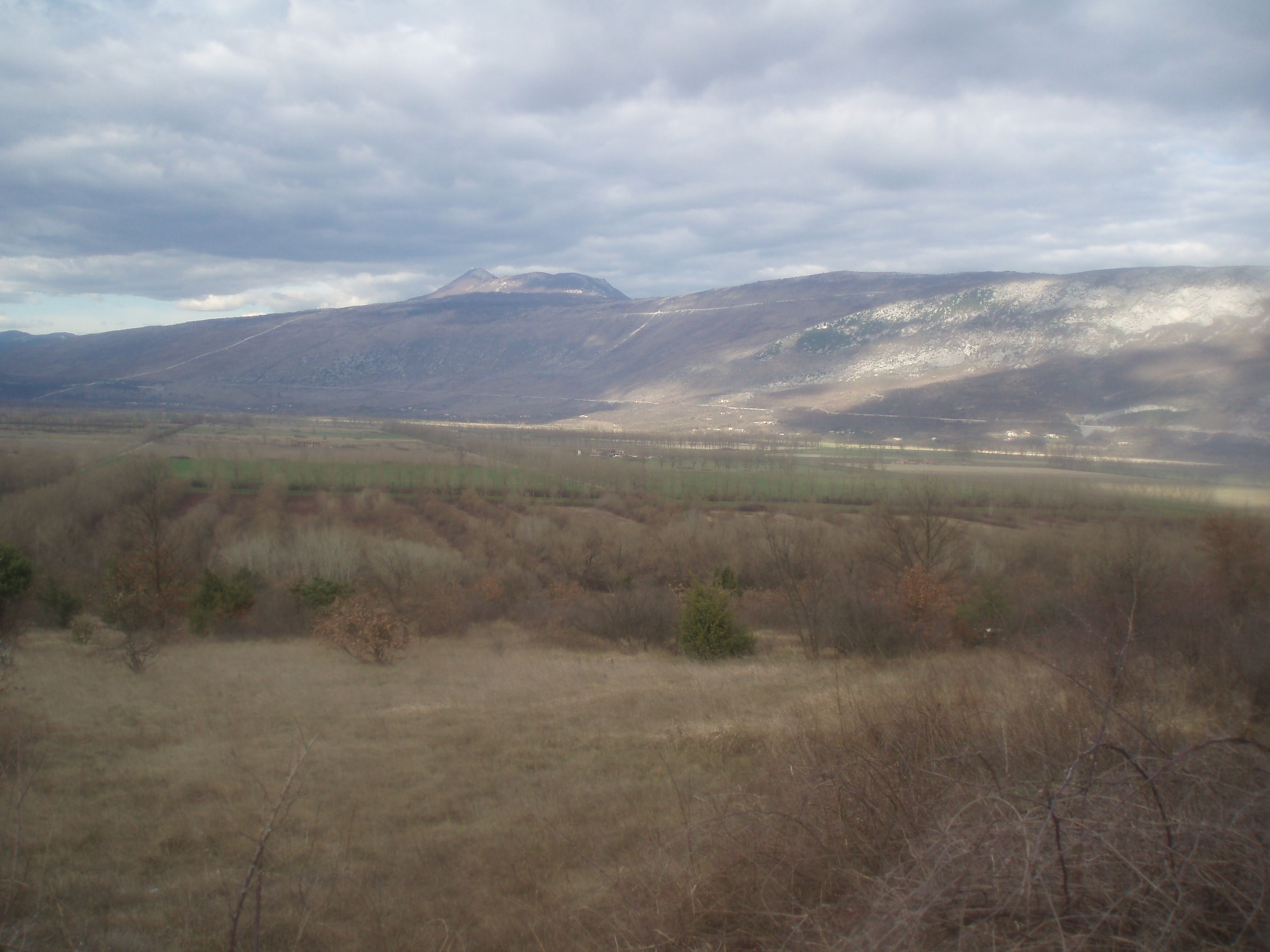
The field seen from the village of Jesenovik

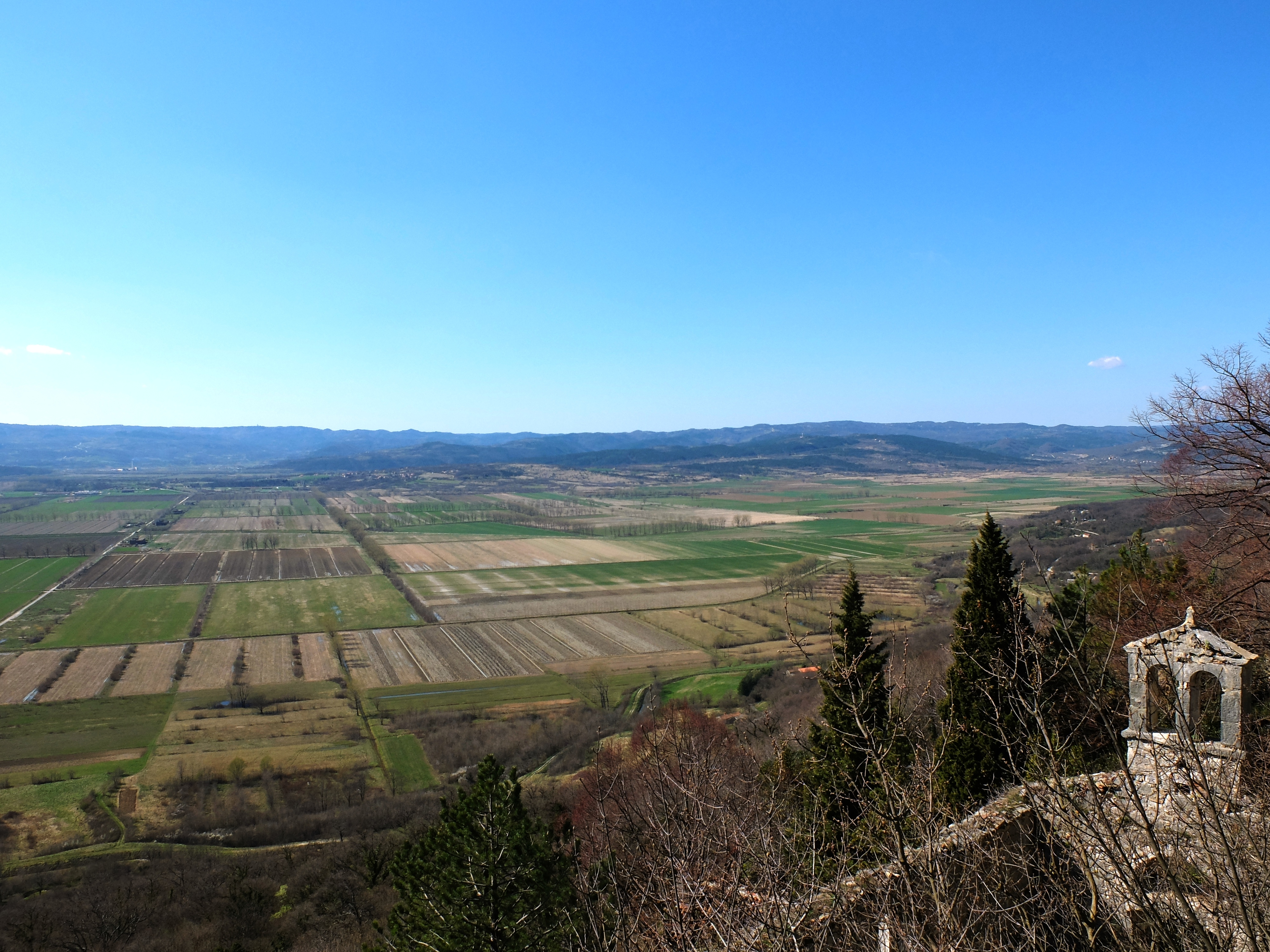
Panorama of the field seen from Kožljak
