= Boljunčica =

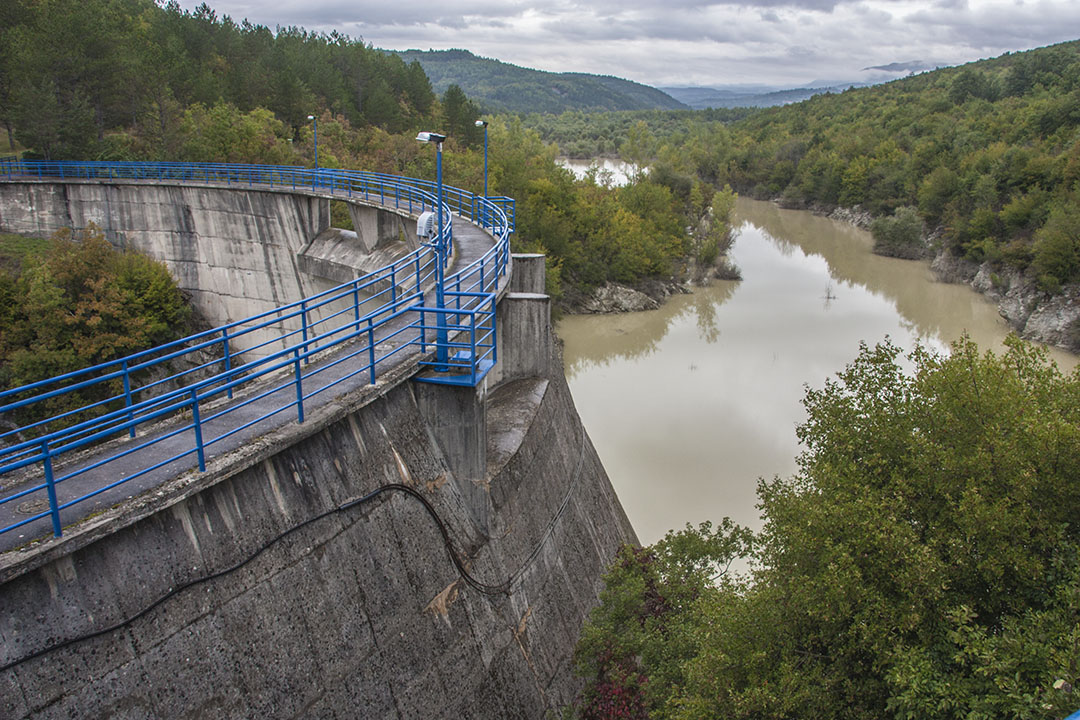

Location
- Country: Croatia

Physical characteristics
- Mouth
  - location: Adriatic Sea
  - coordinates: 45.1332°N 14.1778°E
- Length: 33 km (21 mi)
- Basin size: 230 km^{2} (89 sq mi)

Boljunčica is a river in inland Istria, Croatia. It discharges into the Adriatic Sea near Plomin. It is 33 kilometres (21 mi) long with a basin area of 230 square kilometres (89 sq mi). Its average discharge at the measurement station in Polje Čepić (covering 183 km^{2} of the basin) is 0.956 m^{3}/s, and it can go completely dry.

Boljunčica rises on the western slopes of the Učka mountain and flows to the south. Near Polje Čepić and Potpićan, it goes underground and emerges near Plomin.
