= Kožljak =

Kožljak Cosliacco
- Village
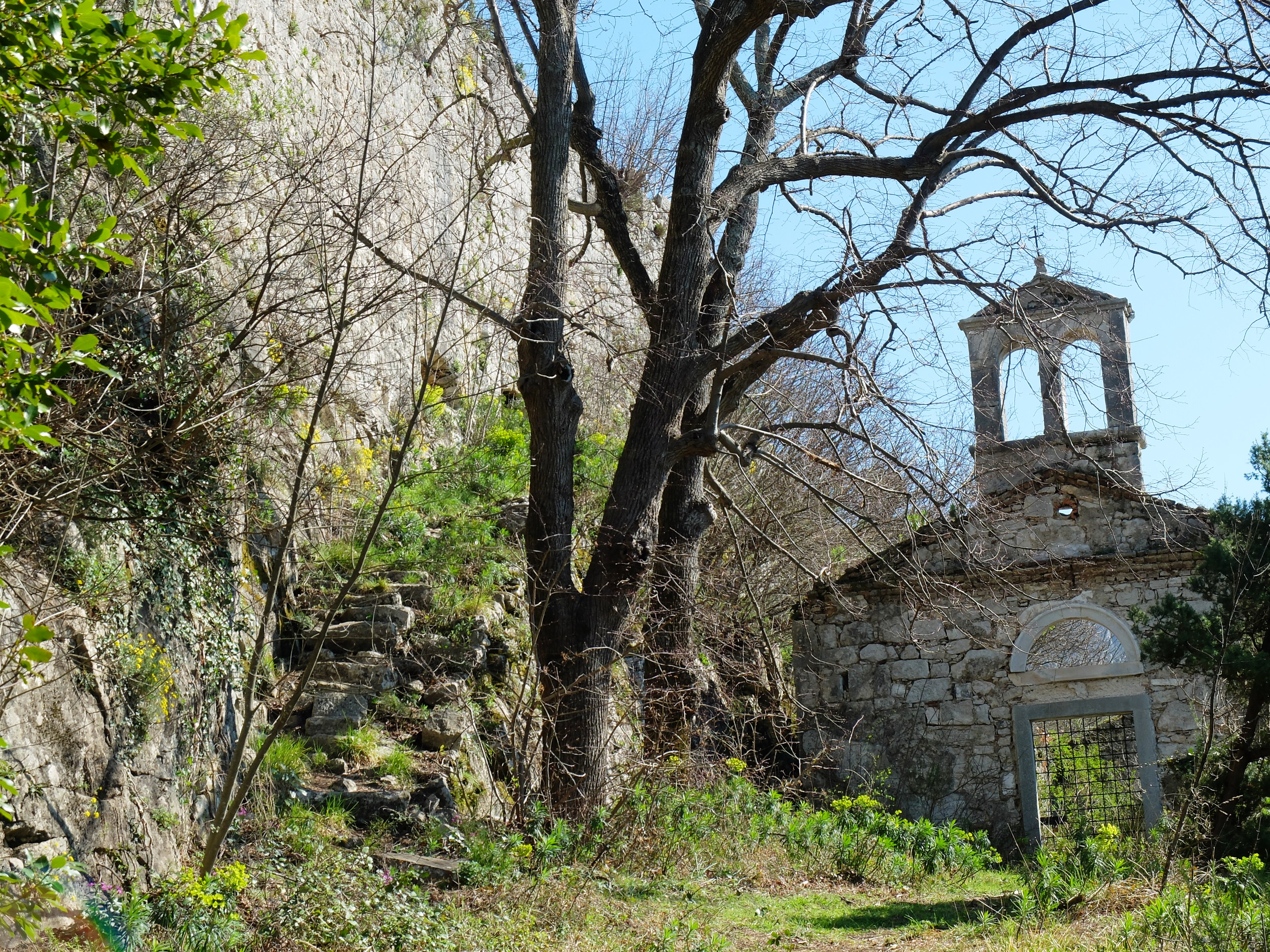
- Ruins of medieval castle Kožljak, in Istria, Croatia

- Location within Croatia
- Coordinates: 45°10′42″N 14°10′43″E
- Country: Croatia
- County: Istria County
- Municipality: Kršan

Area
  - Total: 6.9 sq mi (18.0 km^{2})
- Elevation: 210 ft (64 m)

Population (2021)
  - Total: 160
  - Density: 23/sq mi (8.9/km^{2})
- Time zone: UTC+1 (CET)
  - Summer (DST): UTC+2 (CEST)
- Postal code: 52233
- Area code: 052

Kožljak (Kozljak, Italian: Cosliacco, German: Waxenstein) is a village in Istria County, Croatia, in the municipality of Kršan. The settlement besides of the village consists of nearby homonymous medieval ruinous castle.

== Description ==
It is located in the Labinština microregion in the eastern part of Istrian peninsula, on the western slopes of mountain Učka along the Čepić field, on the local road Šušnjevica-Vozilići (L50180), 6 km east from the municipal center Kršan (D64), and 13 km north-east of the city of Labin. In the village is the railway station of Lupoglav-Štalije route. Nearby is abandoned village Zagrad which leads to the castle.

The Croatian primary school was founded in 1907. The inhabitants mainly lived from agriculture, and until the drain of former Lake Čepić, even from fishery. Vladimir Nazor inspired by castles story wrote ballad Krvava košulja and novel Krvavi dani.

== Castle history ==
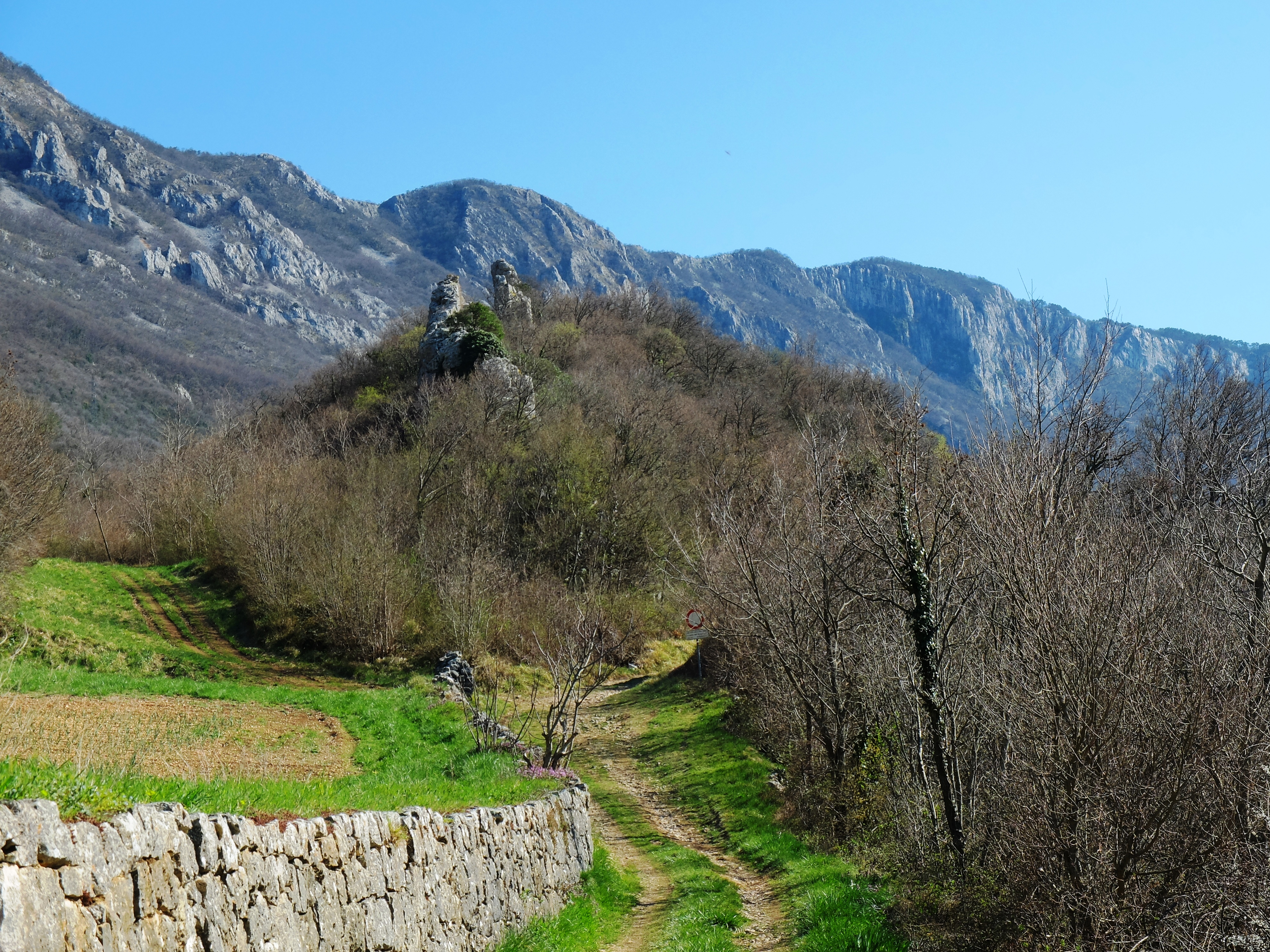
The steep cliff where are the ruins of the medieval castle Kožljak, 2015.

In the vicinity of the village is the medieval ruinous castle. The castle is located on a steep cliff (184 m.a.s.l.), along the old road which connected Istria with Croatian Littoral (Kvarner). It was built on the place of prehistoric hill fort. It was first mentioned at the time of Patriarchate of Aquileia in 1102 under name Castrum Iosilach in the grant by Ulric II and his wife Adelaide to Aquileia patriarchs. Later it is also mentioned as Gosilach, Wachsenstein or Waxenstein (from 13th century), Cosgliacco (1275), and Kožlak (Istrian Demarcation, 13th-14th century). It belonged to the Patria del Friuli, and from 13th century as loaned feud of County of Gorizia, what would become Austrian part of Istria (March of Istria), situated at the very border area between Austrian and Venetian Istria.

From the 13th century, the feud was hereditary possession of Counts of Görz. Its first manor was counts vassal and castle governor Philip, mentioned several times between 1234 and 1264, and then his heirs, son Karstman I, grandson Karstman II, and great grandson Filip Macić (was involved with Istrian Demarcation) and Ulrich. With the death of count Heinrich III in 1323, the castle was in conflict of interest between Gorizia counts, Aquileia patriarchs and Venice. The counts of Gorizia, Heinrich III's wife Beatrix and brother Albert II, ascribed the feud and in 1325 give away for debt settlement to Hugo III of Duino, but patriarch Pagano della Torre prevented it in 1328. In 1331-1332, helped by Fridrik III of Krk (Frankopan), the Venice tried to take possession of the castle, but unsuccessfully besieged it almost a year. In 1342, although patriarch Bertram of St. Genesius gave the feud to Juraj and Rudolf III of Duin and their cousin Hugo V, it also ascribed by count Albert III, who somehow managed to acquire it and defend it between 1359 and 1361 from patriarch Lodovico della Torre. In 1508, the Venice, and in the 15th century on two occasions Ivan VII Frankopan of Krk, tried to conquer it.

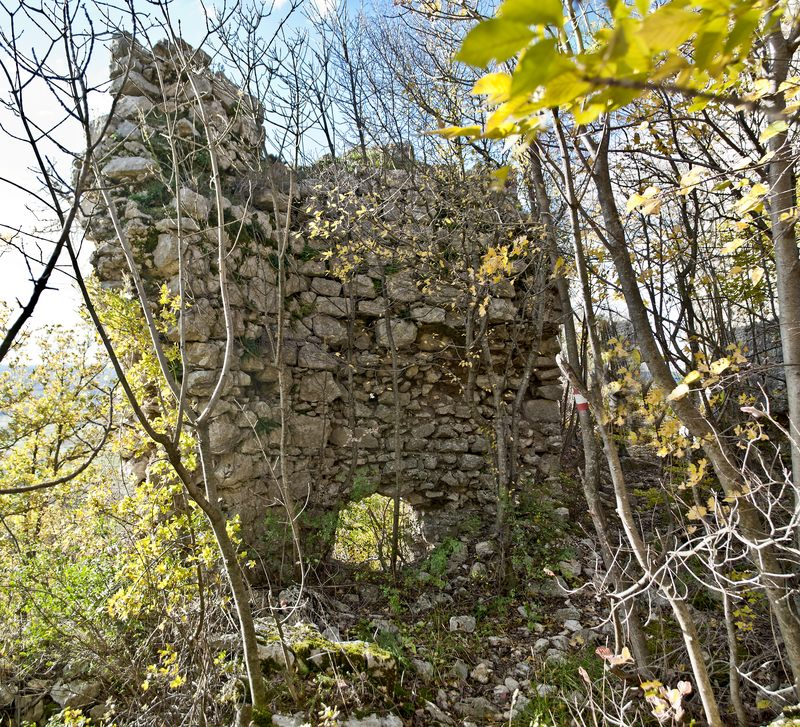
Ruins of old Kožljak Castle in 2013.

The count Albert III gave it in the second half of 14th century to Filip of Gutenegg (fort Guteneck, Gvothnic, Gotnik) family. The feud was from counts of Gorizia inherited by Habsburg family. It was in the possession of his son Filip III, grandsons Herman and Nikola, and grangrandsons Ivan and Juraj, who without heirs, the castle becomes property of Ivan's wife Anna Schonberg cousin, Grgur Moysevich. From 1436 until 1518 was in the possession of Moysevich (Moise, Mojsijević) patrician family from Senj, and in the period of Martin Moysevich manorial estates significantly extended their possession and included Brdo, Grobnik, Posert Castle, Letaj, Šušnjevica and Nova Vas.

As his heir had no son, the hereditary rights were transferred on his daughters so the castle in 1529 came into dual possession of Castellano Barbo and Jakov Nikolić. The son of Jakov, Josip, known for arrogance and cruelty, was murdered in 1574 by the rebel villagers, and his line extinguished with Ivan in 1600, when the castle has entirely become the property of Barbo family, whose member Francesco Barbo stood out particularly as made the castle the center of Protestantism in Istria, and cherished the Glagolitic cultural tradition from before. In 1668 it was sold to the Johann Weikhard from Auersperg noble family, and since then has remained unkept, becoming only the ruins.

The castle had access only from the west, and was well adapted to the terrain, on three terraces, extending in north-south direction. It consisted of defensive walls, and the main gate led to a small yard, from the south closed by bastion, while north by the fort, with two towers. Within the walls was the single nave Romanesque chapel, after the parish church of St. Hadrian which in 1834 was rebuilt. Outside the walls at the graveyard are two more chapels, of St. George, in which is plate with Glagolitic inscription from 1590, and of the Holy Cross, created with a Baroque upgrade of chancel to medieval nave.

== Demographics ==
According to the 2021 census, its population was 160. It was also 160 in 2011.

Population number according to the census
1857	1869	1880	1890	1900	1910	1921	1931	1948	1953	1961	1971	1981	1991	2001	2011	2021
497	430	477	490	556	574	635	579	466	543	424	333	250	196	193	160	160

Note: Named as Sela in 1880 and Selo from 1980 until 1910, and from 1921 until 1991 as Kozljak. From 1991 is named as Kožljak. Contains part of data for ex-village Katun, which from 1880 until 1910 was separate settlement, and for ex-village Mala Kraska which in 1857, 1869 and 1921 was considered a village.

== Gallery ==
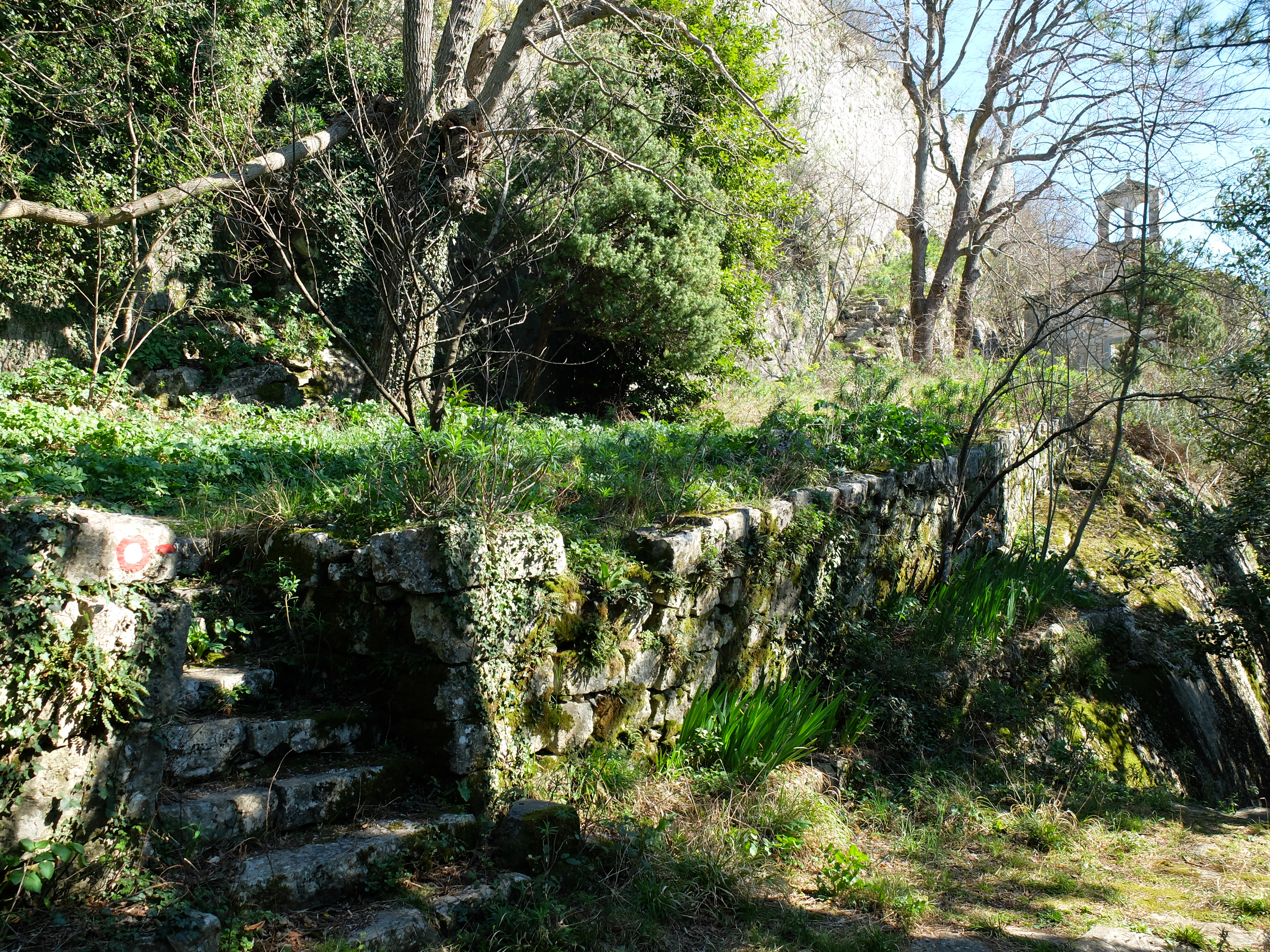
The inside of the castle

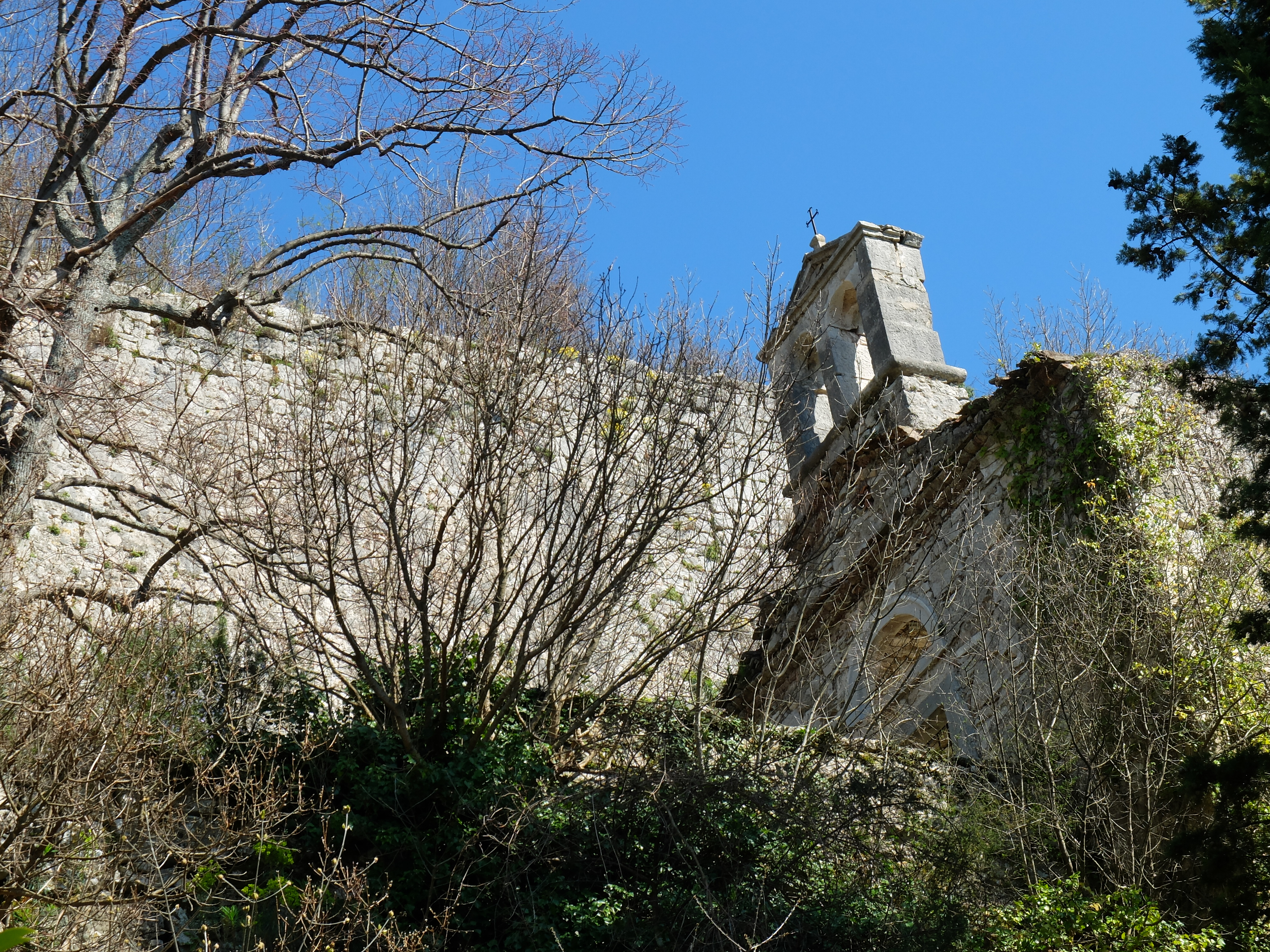
The church of St. Hadrian and walls of the third terrace

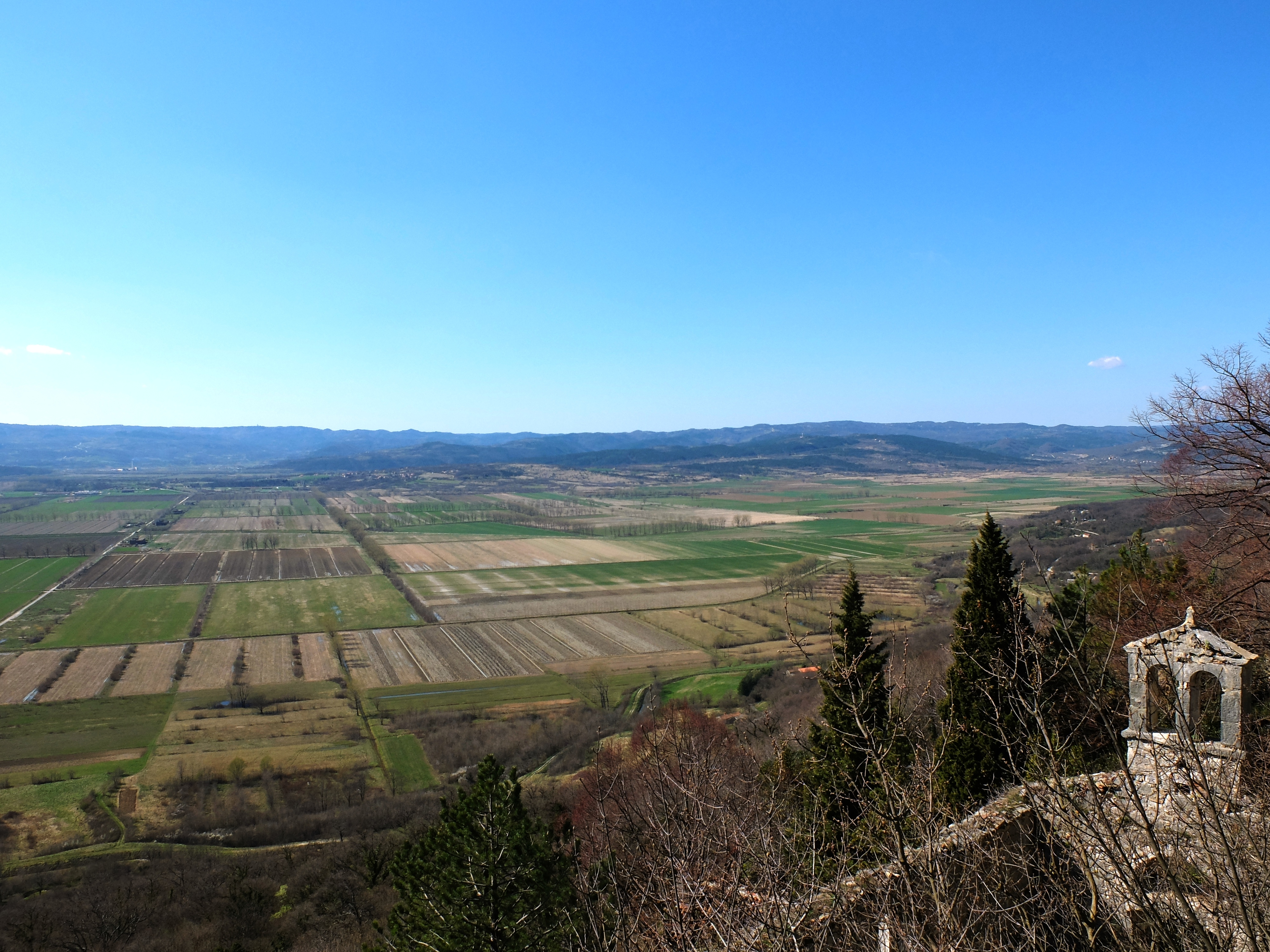
Panorama of Čepić field seen from Kožljak
