= Boljevići =

Boljevići may refer to:

- Boljevići (Bratunac), Bosnia and Herzegovina
- Boljevići, Istria County, Croatia
- Boljevići (Bar Municipality), Montenegro
