= Lanišće, Kršan =

Lanišće
- Village
- Location within Croatia
- Coordinates: 45.2104549°N 14.1233747°E
- Country: Croatia
- County: Istria County
- Municipality: Kršan

Area
  - Total: 1.1 sq mi (2.9 km^{2})

Population (2021)
  - Total: 77
  - Density: 69/sq mi (27/km^{2})
- Time zone: UTC+1 (CET)
  - Summer (DST): UTC+2 (CEST)
- Postal code: 52232 Kršan
- Area code: 052

Lanišće is a village in Kršan municipality in Istria County, Croatia. In the 2021 census, its population is 77.
