= D500 road =

Road in Croatia

D500 state road

Route information
- Length: 23.7 km (14.7 mi)

Major junctions
- From: A8 in Vranja interchange
- To: D64 in Kršan

Location
- Country: Croatia
- Counties: Istria
- Major cities: Kršan

Highway system
- Highways in Croatia

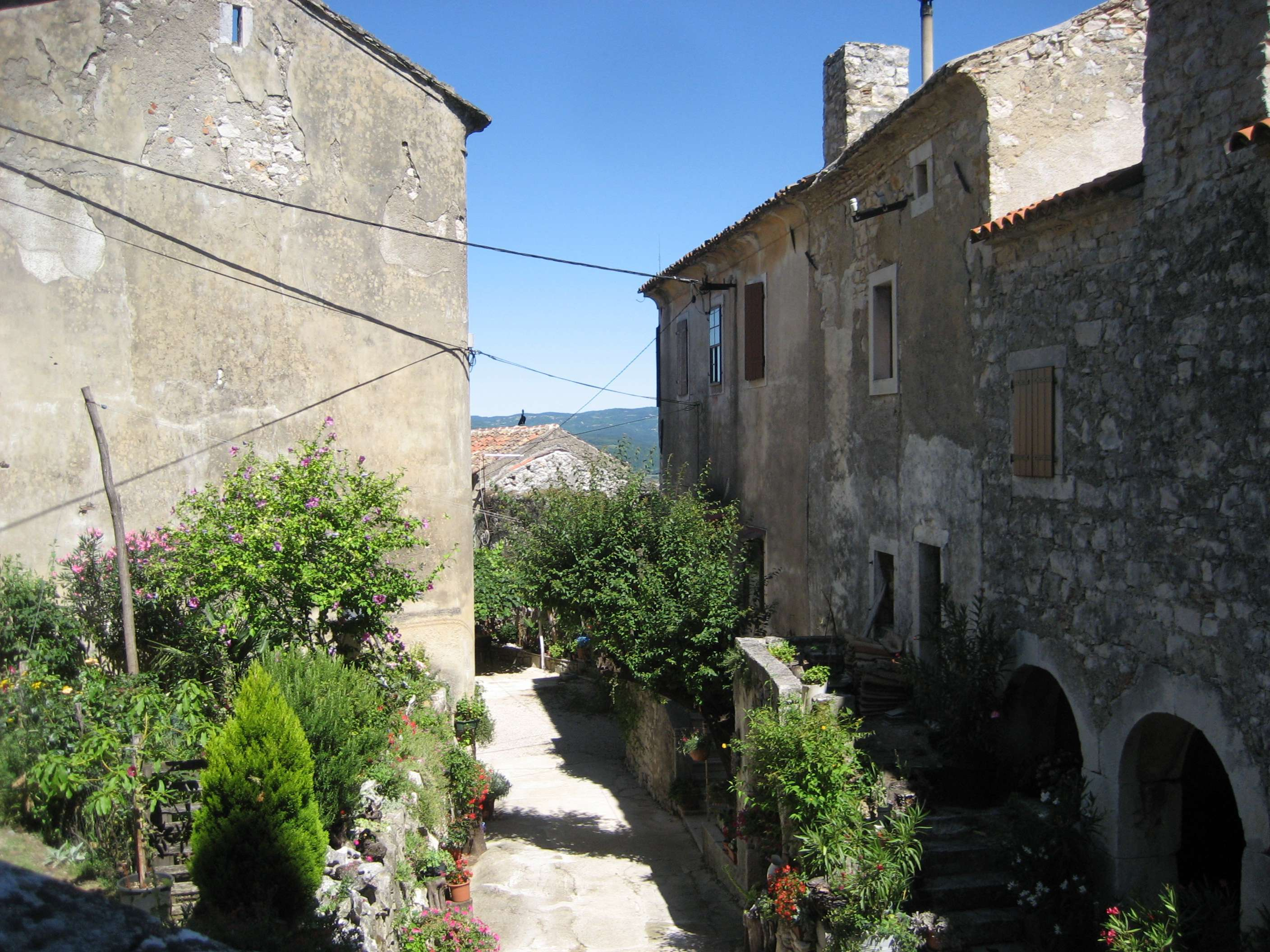
Kršan, at the southern terminus of the D500 road

D500 is a state road connecting A8 motorway (Vranja interchange) to Kršan and D64 state road. The road is 23.7 km (14.7 mi) long.

The road, as well as all other state roads in Croatia, is managed and maintained by Hrvatske ceste, a state owned company.

== Traffic volume ==
Traffic is regularly counted and reported by Hrvatske ceste, operator of the road. Substantial variations between annual (AADT) and summer (ASDT) traffic volumes are attributed to the fact that the road connects A8 motorway carrying substantial tourist traffic.

D500 traffic volume
Road	Counting site	AADT	ASDT	Notes
D500	2811 Vranja	1,850	2,634	The only published traffic counting site on D500.

== Road junctions and populated areas ==
D500 junctions/populated areas
Type	Slip roads/Notes
	A8 motorway to Pula (to the south) and to Rijeka (to the north); Ž5047 to Veprinac. The northern terminus of the road.
	Vranja; L50084 to Lupoglav.
	Boljunsko Polje
	Ž5046 to Paz and Cerovlje.
	Brnjci; L50087 to Boljun.
	L50180 to Šušnjevica, Nova Vas and Kožljak.
	Kršan; D64 to Pazin (to the west) and to Vozilići and D66 to the east. The southern terminus of the road.

== See also ==
- BINA Istra
