= Potpićan =

Potpićan Sottopedena
- Village
- Location within Croatia
- Coordinates: 45.1907859°N 14.0870372°E
- Country: Croatia
- County: Istria County
- Municipality: Kršan

Area
  - Total: 0.46 sq mi (1.2 km^{2})

Population (2021)
  - Total: 449
  - Density: 970/sq mi (370/km^{2})
- Time zone: UTC+1 (CET)
  - Summer (DST): UTC+2 (CEST)
- Postal code: 52333 Podpićan
- Area code: 052

Potpićan (Italian: Sottopedena) is a village in Kršan municipality in Istria County, Croatia.

== Demographics ==
According to the 2021 census, its population was 449.
