= Zatka Čepić =

Settlement in Istria County, Croatia

- Settlement
- Interactive map of Zatka Čepić
- Location of Zatka Čepić in Croatia
- Coordinates: 45°12′50″N 14°07′52″E
- Country: Croatia
- County: Istria County
- Municipality: Kršan

Area
  - Total: 4.3 km^{2} (1.7 sq mi)

Population (2021)
  - Total: 29
  - Density: 6.7/km^{2} (17/sq mi)
- Time zone: UTC+1 (CET)
  - Summer (DST): UTC+2 (CEST)
- Postal code: 52333 Podpićan
- Area code: +385 (0)52

Zatka Čepić is a settlement in the Municipality of Kršan in Croatia. In 2021, its population was 29.

== Demographics ==
Zatka Čepić: Population trends 1857–2021
v

population			142	167	160	177			145	127	112	82	52	49	37	31	29
	1857	1869	1880	1890	1900	1910	1921	1931	1948	1953	1961	1971	1981	1991	2001	2011	2021

Sources: Croatian Bureau of Statistics publications
