= Plomin Luka =

Plomin Luka Piana d'Arsa
- Village
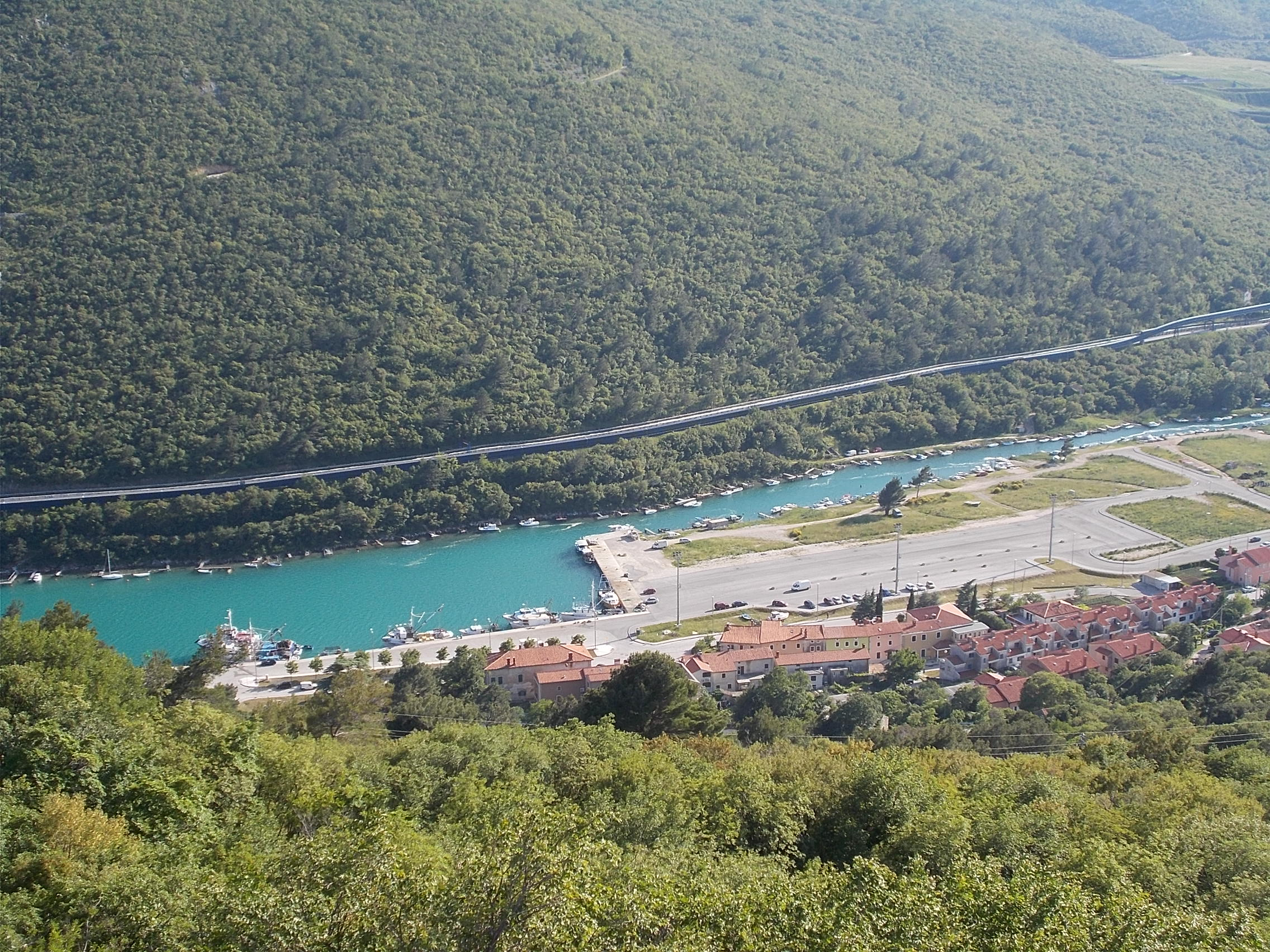
- Plomin Luka and Plomin bay from the old town of Plomin

- Location within Croatia
- Coordinates: 45.1370039°N 14.1372086°E
- Country: Croatia
- County: Istria County
- Municipality: Kršan

Area
  - Total: 2.2 sq mi (5.6 km^{2})

Population (2021)
  - Total: 143
  - Density: 66/sq mi (26/km^{2})
- Time zone: UTC+1 (CET)
  - Summer (DST): UTC+2 (CEST)
- Postal code: 52234 Plomin
- Area code: 052

Plomin Luka (Italian: Piana d'Arsa) is a village in Kršan municipality in Istria County, Croatia.

== Demographics ==
According to the 2021 census, its population was 143.
