= Zagorje, Kršan =

Zagorje
- Village
- Location within Croatia
- Coordinates: 45.1373647°N 14.190408°E
- Country: Croatia
- County: Istria County
- Municipality: Kršan

Area
  - Total: 2.8 sq mi (7.2 km^{2})

Population (2021)
  - Total: 104
  - Density: 37/sq mi (14/km^{2})
- Time zone: UTC+1 (CET)
  - Summer (DST): UTC+2 (CEST)
- Postal code: 52234 Plomin
- Area code: 052

Zagorje is a village in Kršan municipality in Istria County, Croatia.

== Demographics ==
According to the 2021 census, its population was 104.
