= Veljaki =

Veljaki Vegliacchi
- Village
- Location within Croatia
- Coordinates: 45.1757299°N 14.1091359°E
- Country: Croatia
- County: Istria County
- Municipality: Kršan

Area
  - Total: 0.54 sq mi (1.4 km^{2})

Population (2021)
  - Total: 116
  - Density: 210/sq mi (83/km^{2})
- Time zone: UTC+1 (CET)
  - Summer (DST): UTC+2 (CEST)
- Postal code: 52232 Kršan
- Area code: 052

Veljaki (Italian: Vegliacchi) is a village in Kršan municipality in Istria County, Croatia.

== Demographics ==
According to the 2021 census, its population was 116.
