= Blaškovići =

Blaškovići Boscosello, Blascovi
- Village
- Location within Croatia
- Coordinates: 45.1843291°N 14.1173042°E
- Country: Croatia
- County: Istria County
- Municipality: Kršan

Area
  - Total: 1.4 sq mi (3.7 km^{2})

Population (2021)
  - Total: 207
  - Density: 140/sq mi (56/km^{2})
- Time zone: UTC+1 (CET)
  - Summer (DST): UTC+2 (CEST)
- Postal code: 52232 Kršan
- Area code: 052

Blaškovići (Italian: Boscosello or Blascovi) is a village in Kršan municipality in Istria County, Croatia.

== Demographics ==
According to the 2021 census, its population was 207.
