= Čambarelići =

Čambarelići Ciambarelli
- Village
- Location within Croatia
- Coordinates: 45.1833072°N 14.0917135°E
- Country: Croatia
- County: Istria County
- Municipality: Kršan

Area
  - Total: 0.77 sq mi (2.0 km^{2})

Population (2021)
  - Total: 145
  - Density: 190/sq mi (73/km^{2})
- Time zone: UTC+1 (CET)
  - Summer (DST): UTC+2 (CEST)
- Postal code: 52232 Kršan
- Area code: 052

Čambarelići (Italian: Ciambarelli) is a village in Kršan municipality in Istria County, Croatia.

== Demographics ==
According to the 2021 census, its population was 145.
