= Vozilići =

Vozilići Vosilla
- Village
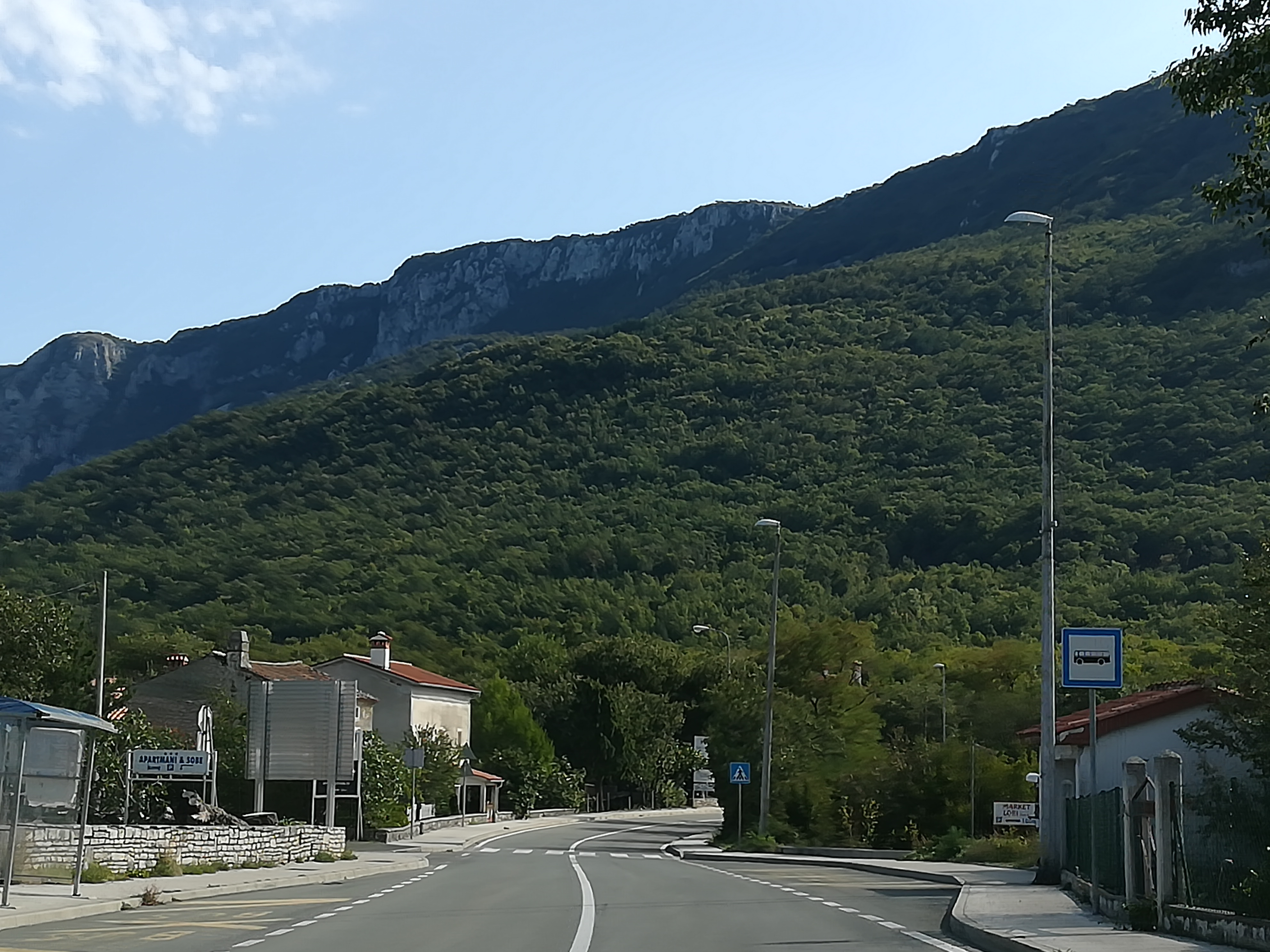
- Vozilići, Kršan

- Location within Croatia
- Country: Croatia
- County: Istria County
- Municipality: Kršan

Area
  - Total: 3.7 sq mi (9.7 km^{2})

Population (2021)
  - Total: 224
  - Density: 60/sq mi (23/km^{2})
- Time zone: UTC+1 (CET)
  - Summer (DST): UTC+2 (CEST)
- Postal code: 52234 Plomin
- Area code: 052

Vozilići (Italian: Vosilla) is a village in Kršan municipality in Istria County, Croatia. It is connected by the D66 highway.

== Demographics ==
According to the 2021 census, its population was 224. It was 236 in 2011.

== Bibliography ==
=== Biology ===
- Šašić, Martina; Nahirnić, Ana; Tarmann, Gerhard M. (2016-12-31). "Zygaenidae (Lepidoptera) in the Lepidoptera collections of the Croatian Natural History Museum". Natura Croatica: Periodicum Musei Historiae Naturalis Croatici. 25 (2): 233–248. doi:10.20302/NC.2016.25.19. eISSN 1848-7386.
