= Kršan =

Kršan Chersano
- Municipality
- Kršan Municipality
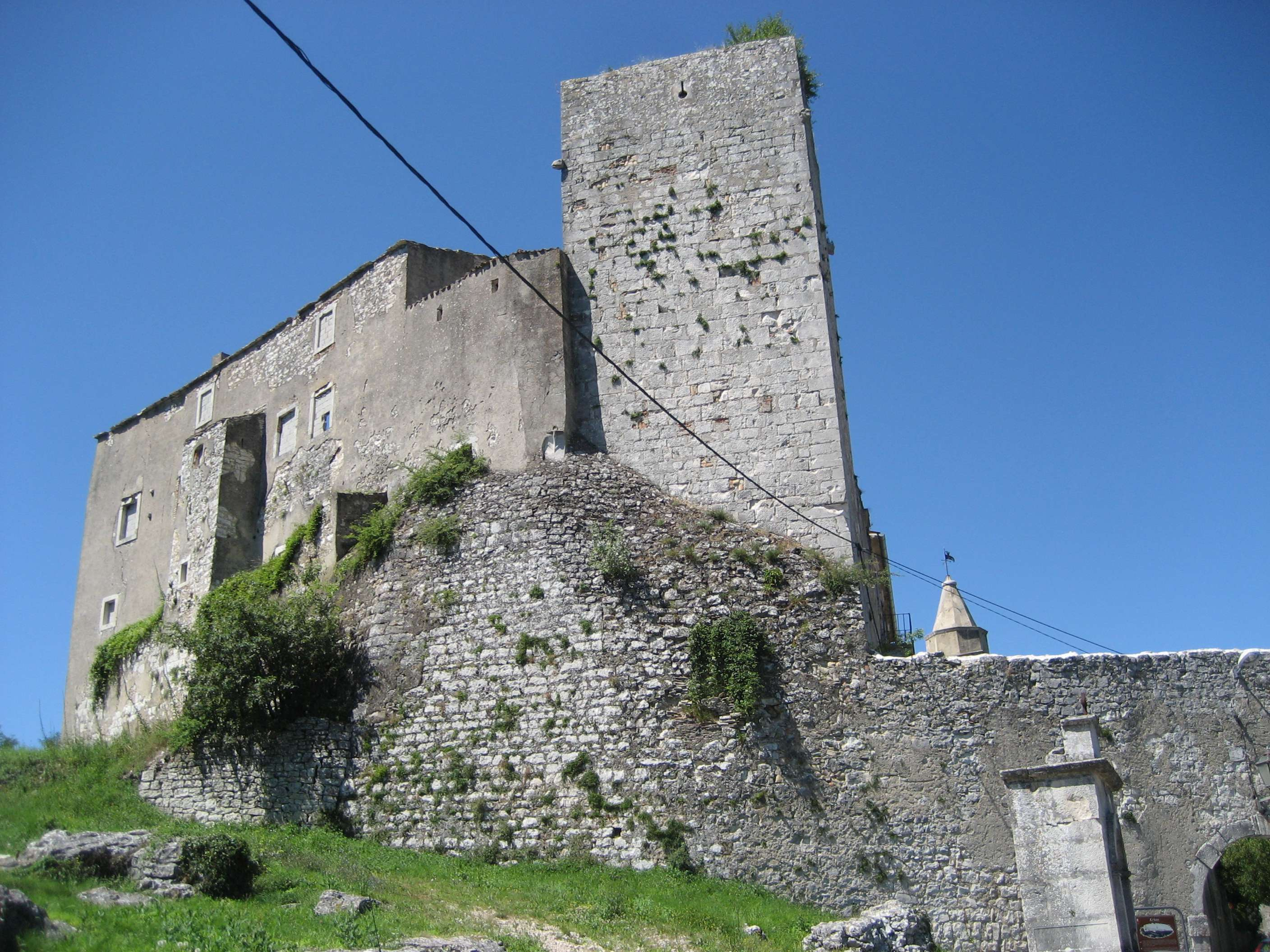

- Flag

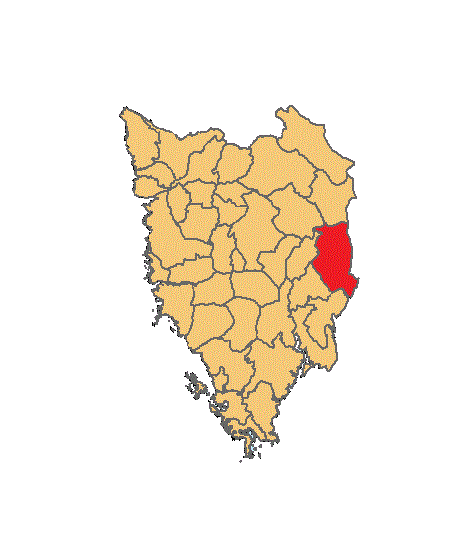
- Location of Kršan municipality in Istria
- Interactive map of Kršan
- Location within Croatia
- Coordinates: 45°10′24″N 14°08′21″E
- Country: Croatia
- County: Istria County

Government
  - Mayor: Valdi Runko

Area
  - Municipality: 47.6 sq mi (123.4 km^{2})
  - Urban: 1.0 sq mi (2.7 km^{2})
- Elevation: 430 ft (130 m)

Population (2021)
  - Municipality: 2,829
  - Density: 59.38/sq mi (22.93/km^{2})
  - Urban: 227
  - Urban density: 220/sq mi (84/km^{2})
- Time zone: UTC+1 (CET)
  - Summer (DST): UTC+2 (CEST)
- Postal code: 52333 Podpića
- Website: krsan.hr

Kršan (Italian: Chersano, Istro Romanian: Cârșån) is a village and municipality in the eastern part of Istria County, Croatia.

== Description ==
It is located in the eastern part of Istria, west of mountain Učka and southwest of Čepić field, on the state road D64 between county center Pazin (D48) and village Vozilići (D66). It is 12 km north of town Labin, and 22 km southeast of town Pazin.

The old town, medieval castle (mentioned 1274), lies on the hill, while new town and village is along the road. According to tradition, the name is derived from the rocky karst hill on which was built, Croatian: krš, German: karst, Italian: carso.

== Castle history ==
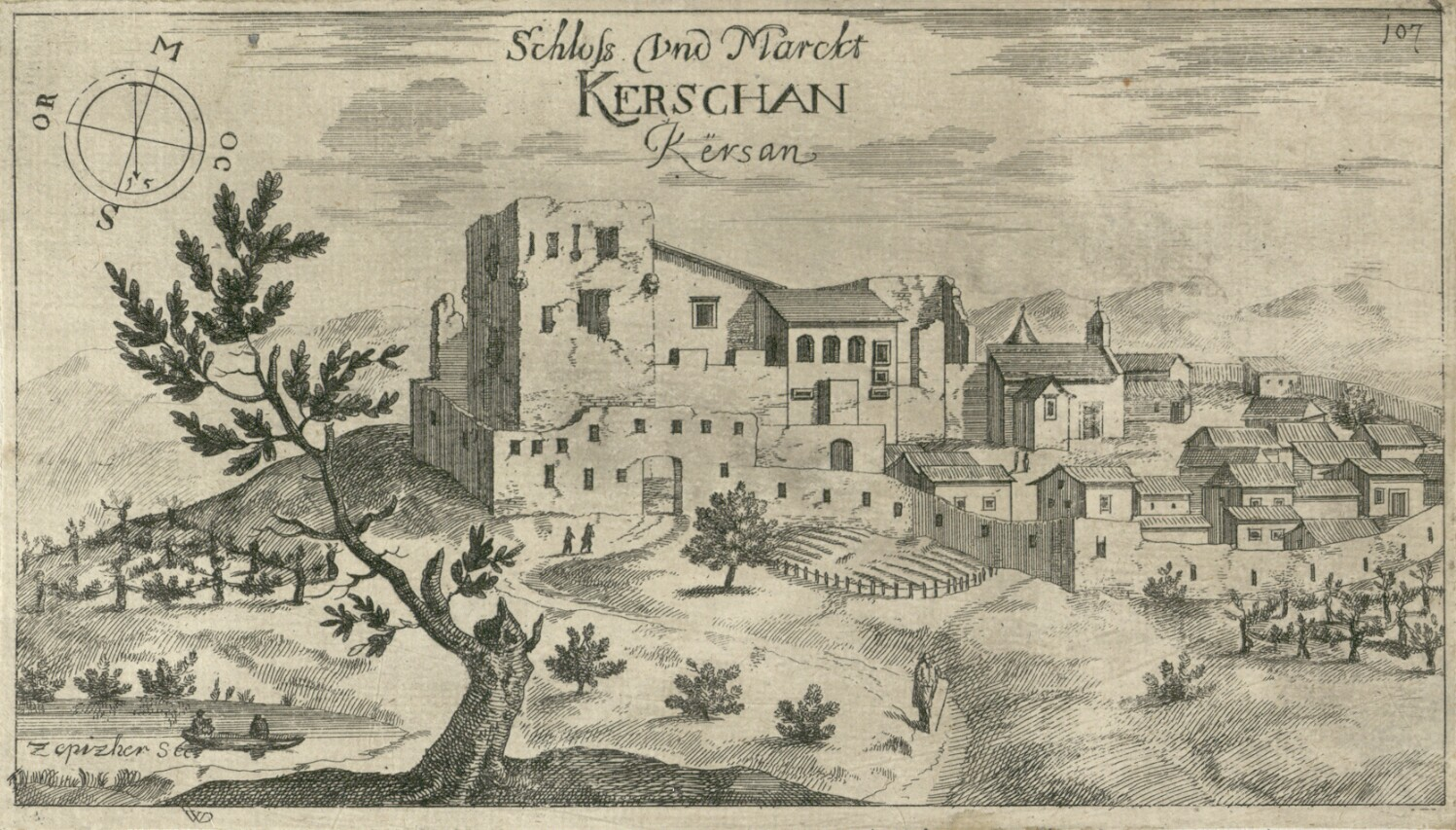
Kršan in an engraving from 1679.

The castle is first mentioned in 1274 as Castrum Carsach, in a peace agreement between Aquileia patriarch Raimondo della Torre, and Count Albert I of Gorizia who in the conflict that started in 1268 during patriarch Gregorio di Montelongo conquered and destroyed the fortified settlement. It was abandoned until the 13th or early 14th century, when it was rebuilt by Heinrich III. Until 1374, when counts of Gorizia became extinct, it was in duality of governance, between the real masters Counts of Gorizia, and Aquileia church in which name the Counts ruled over the castle. When the counts extinct it wasn't returned to Aquleia patriarchs (the state Patria del Friuli), but was inherited by Habsburg family.

The Habsburg family gave it to their vassal Krotendorfer or Cherstlein family, who after the castle had attribute "Karscheyner", and later also acquired Šumber castle. Since then the castle is mentioned as Kršan (Kerschan). They kept it until 1631, with short interruptions when its lords were families Devinski (1388–99), Walsee (1399–1431) and Wolf (1431–36). Later as lords are mentioned de Fini, Auersperg, Rampelli, Benvenuti dell Argenti, Josip de Sussani (who found the Istrian Demarcation from 13th-14th century), then his nephew Franjo Scribani, then nobleman from Plomin Matija Tonetti, and as last Giovanni Tonetti.

From the medieval castle is well preserved the tower of quadrangular layout, while residential and defensive complex was renovated in new residential buildings. The town is entered on the east side of the completely preserved city gate, on the right hand the city defense wall leans a number of houses of which the first is the old municipal house. In the inner courtyard of the castle has been preserved foursquare frame of Gothic portal from the 15th century, and well throat with engraved year 1666. The two-nave parish church of St. Antun was built in the 17th century, and most of the church furniture dates from the 18th century. At the cemetery is nave chapel of St. Jakov from the 15th century. On the floor of the church, paved with brick and stone, are gravestones of feudal lords from the 15th, 16th and 17th century, particularly the plate from 1415 of Juraj Kršanski in a Latin epitaph inscribed with Gothic letters. In the Plomin church of St. Jurja, there is the oldest known Glagolitic inscription - the Plomin inscription.

== Demographics ==
In 2021, the municipality had 2,829 residents in the following 23 settlements:

- Blaškovići, population 207
- Boljevići, population 109
- Čambarelići, population 145
- Jesenovik, population 42
- Kostrčani, population 21
- Kožljak, population 160
- Kršan, population 227
- Lanišće, population 77
- Lazarići, population 106
- Letaj, population 46
- Nova Vas, population 58
- Plomin, population 96
- Plomin Luka, population 143
- Polje Čepić, population 126
- Potpićan, population 449
- Purgarija Čepić, population 225
- Stepčići, population 36
- Šušnjevica, population 74
- Veljaki, population 116
- Vozilići, population 224
- Zagorje, population 104
- Zankovci, population 9
- Zatka Čepić, population 29
Kršan: Population trends 1857–2021
v

population	5244	4922	5448	5678	6056	6336	5944	5972	5257	4948	4788	3913	3372	3495	3264	2951	2829
	1857	1869	1880	1890	1900	1910	1921	1931	1948	1953	1961	1971	1981	1991	2001	2011	2021

Sources: Croatian Bureau of Statistics publications

=== Municipality ===
Population number according census
1857	1869	1880	1890	1900	1910	1921	1931	1948	1953	1961	1971	1981	1991	2001	2011
5,244	4,922	5,360	5,533	5,885	6,177	5,944	5,972	5,110	4,804	4,665	3,820	3,293	3,424	3,206	2,951

Note: Emerged from old Labin municipality. In 1857, 1869, 1921 and 1931 part of the data is contained in municipality Pićan, and in the same time Kršan contains data od Sveta Nedelja municipality.

=== Village ===
Population number according census
1857	1869	1880	1890	1900	1910	1921	1931	1948	1953	1961	1971	1981	1991	2001	2011
1,155	964	240	229	248	303	1,292	1,357	239	223	229	187	145	221	227	238

Note: In 1857, 1869, 1921 and 1931 contains data for villages Blaškovići, Boljevići, Čamberilići, Lazarići and Veljaki.

== Gallery ==
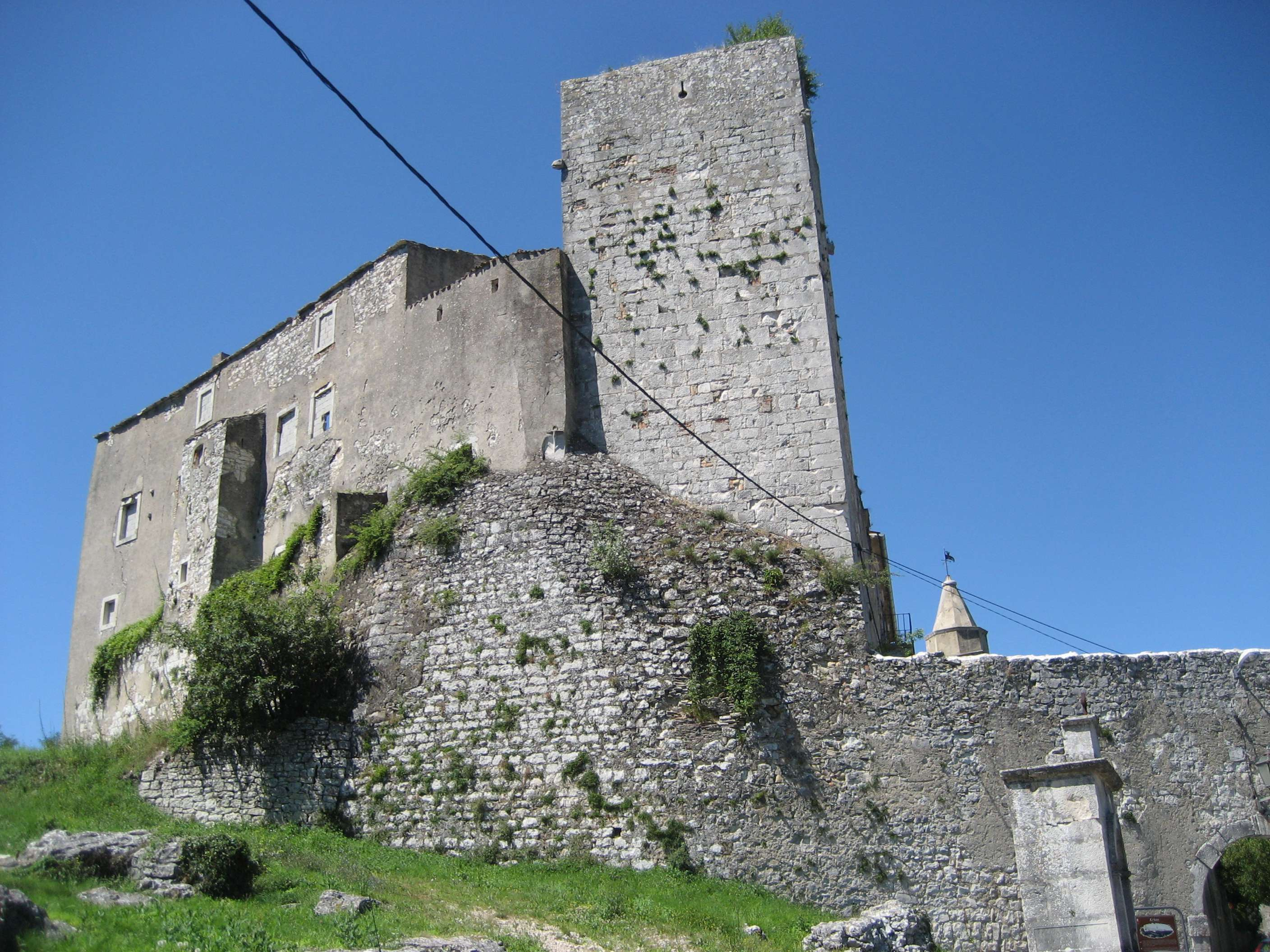
Castle

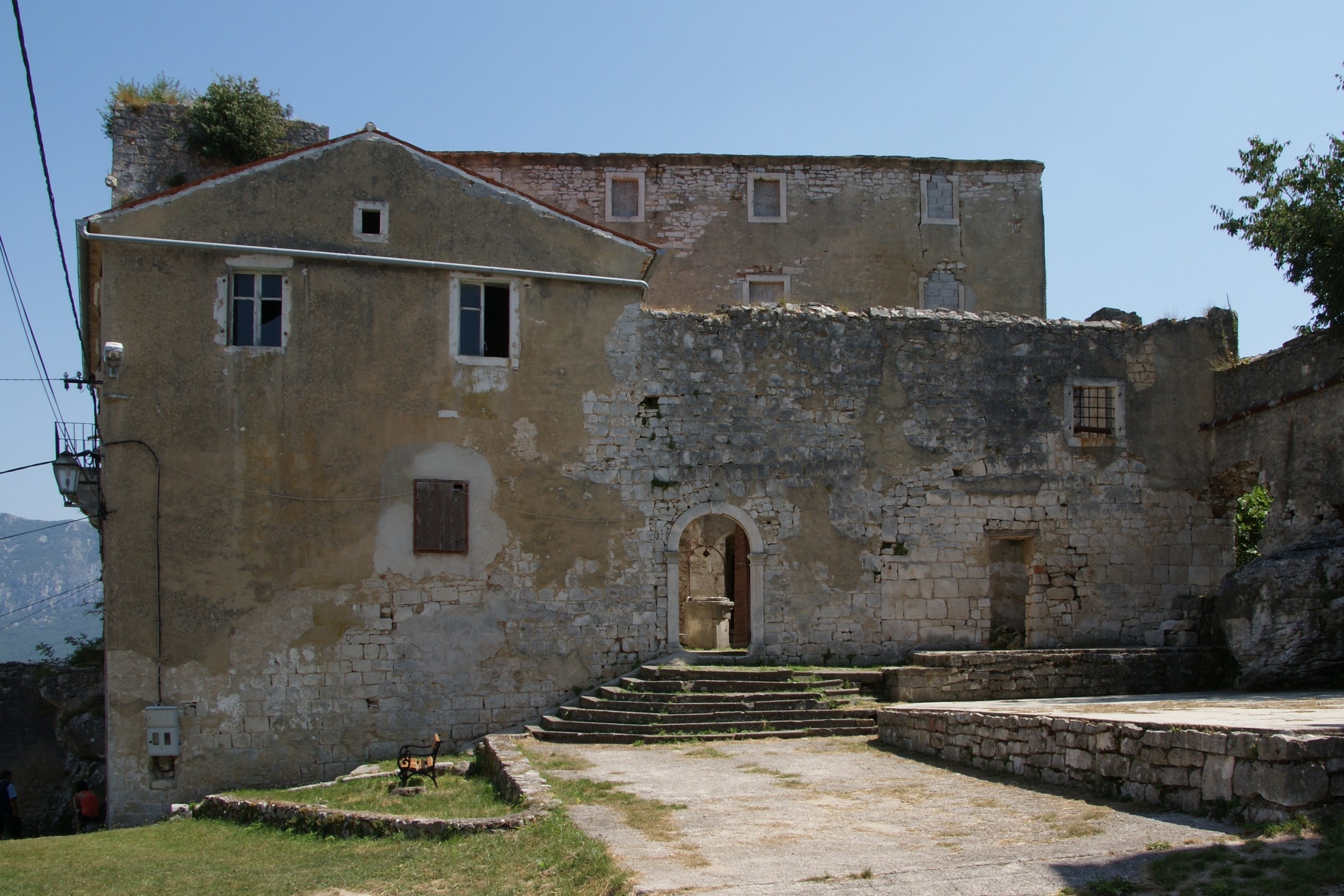
Castle

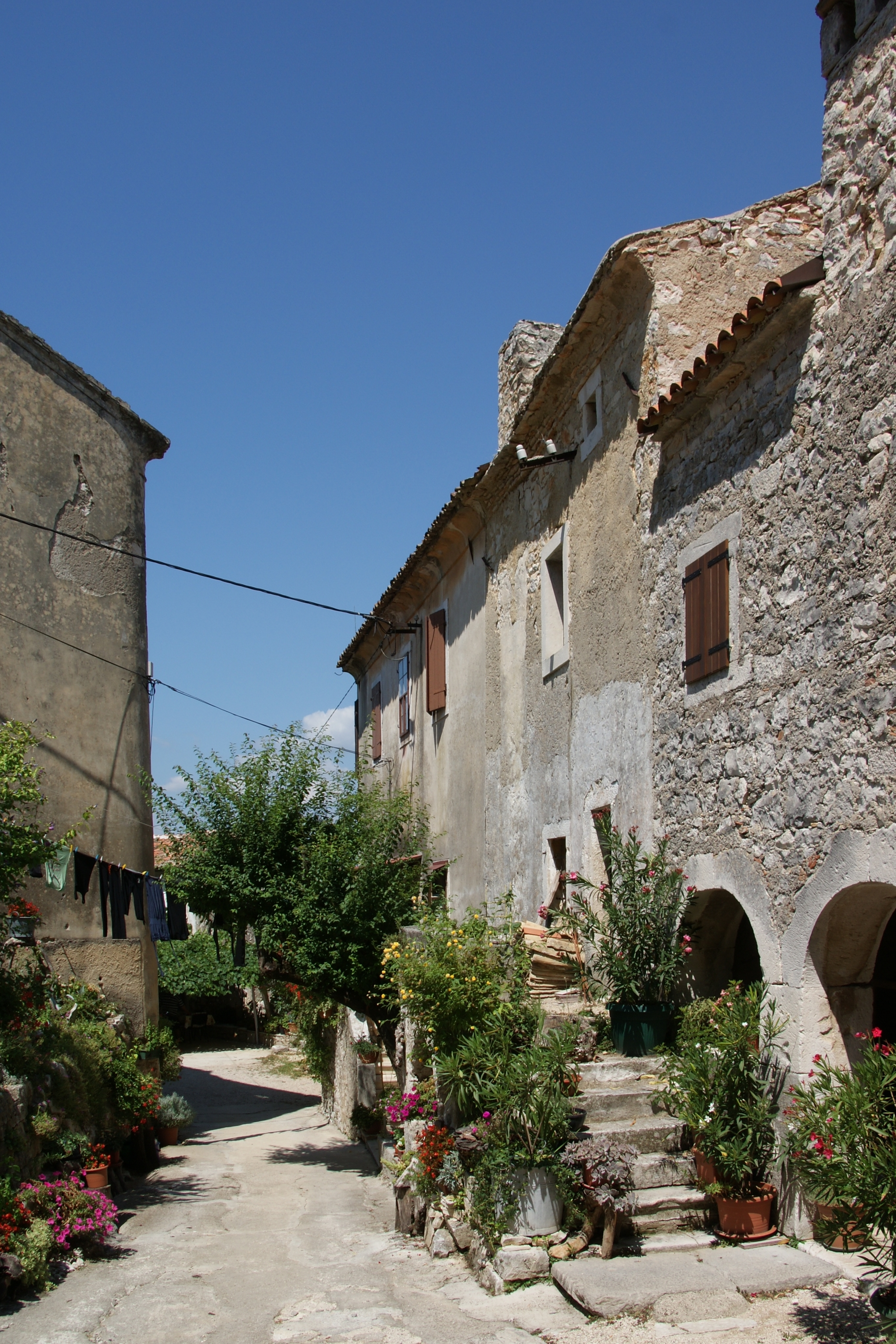
Alley
