= Šušnjevica =

Šušnjevica Susńievița
- Village
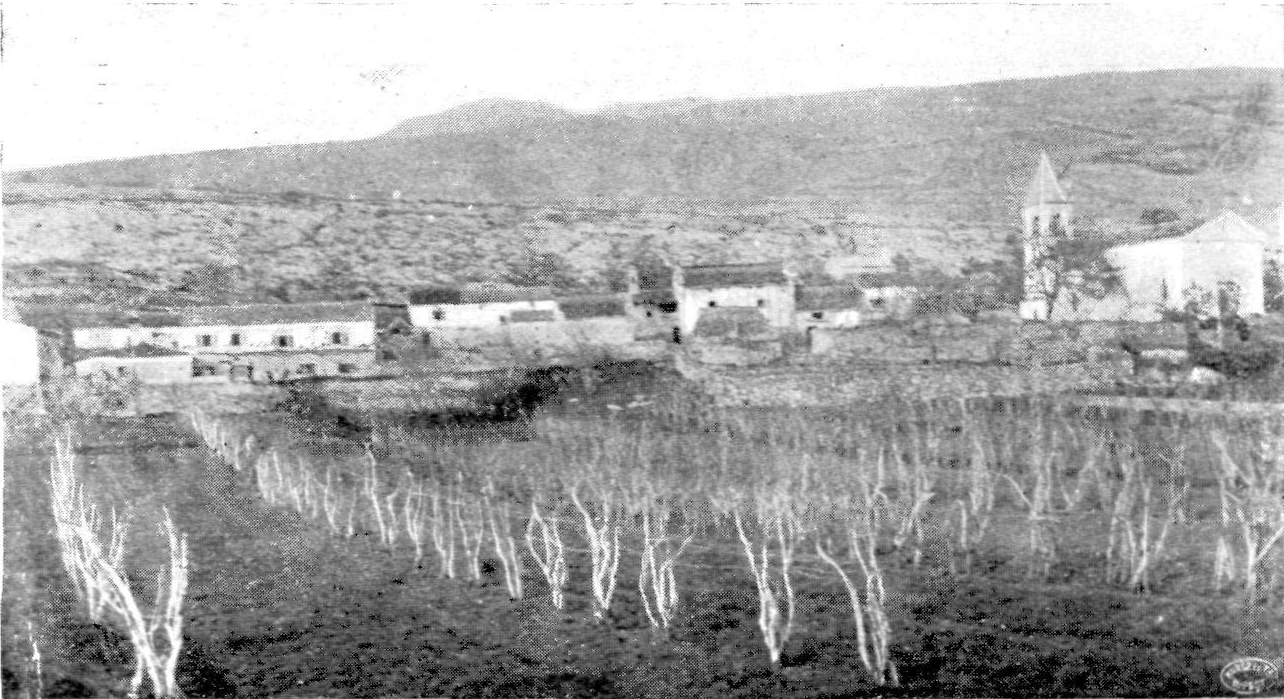

- Location within Croatia
- Coordinates: 45°14′57″N 14°8′38″E
- Country: Croatia
- County: Istria County
- Municipality: Kršan

Area
  - Total: 4.2 sq mi (11.0 km^{2})

Population (2021)
  - Total: 74
  - Density: 17/sq mi (6.7/km^{2})
- Time zone: UTC+1 (CET)
  - Summer (DST): UTC+2 (CEST)
- Postal code: 52233 Šušnjevica
- Area code: 052

Šušnjevica (Istro-Romanian: Șușńievițe or Susńievița; Italian: Susgneviza, Susgnevizza and Valdarsa) is a small village in Istria County, Croatia, in the municipality of Kršan. The village is inhabited mostly by Istro-Romanians.

== Location ==
It is located in the north-eastern part of Istria, 20 km north from Labin and 10 km from the centre of the municipality Kršan. It is on the local road Šušnjevica-Vozilići (L50180), near the road D500, which connects roads D64 and A8. It is near the northern part of Čepić field.

== History ==
Archeological evidence suggests that it was a populated place in prehistoric as well as Roman times. During the Middle Ages, it belonged to the lord of Kožljak. The earliest surviving written evidence of the place dates from 1340. During the 15th and 16th centuries, numerous Istro-Romanians presumably settled in the area. There are contradictory claims, however, that they came much earlier - specifically, during Roman times. In 1922 A.D., under the period of Italian rule, because of its Romanian language and the distinct origin of its population, it was made the center of a municipality.

Its church of St. John the Baptist was built in 1838, replacing the older single-nave church. In the churchyard is a chapel dedicated to St. Sylvester, dating from the 16th and 17th centuries, in which the remains of frescoes and Glagolithic graphites can be seen.

The inhabitants mainly lived from agriculture, and until the draining of Lake Čepić also from fishing.

== Demographics ==
According to the 2021 census, its population was 74. It was 69 in 2011.

Population number according to the census
1857	1869	1880	1890	1900	1910	1921	1931	1948	1953	1961	1971	1981	1991	2001	2011	2021
345	357	385	375	346	353	346	346	231	211	166	128	96	91	75	69	74

== Notable people ==
- Andrei Glavina
