= D64 road =

Road in Croatia

D64 state road

Route information
- Length: 26.9 km (16.7 mi)

Major junctions
- From: D48 in Pazin
- D500 near Kršan
- To: D66 in Vozilići

Location
- Country: Croatia
- Counties: Istria
- Major cities: Pazin

Highway system
- Highways in Croatia

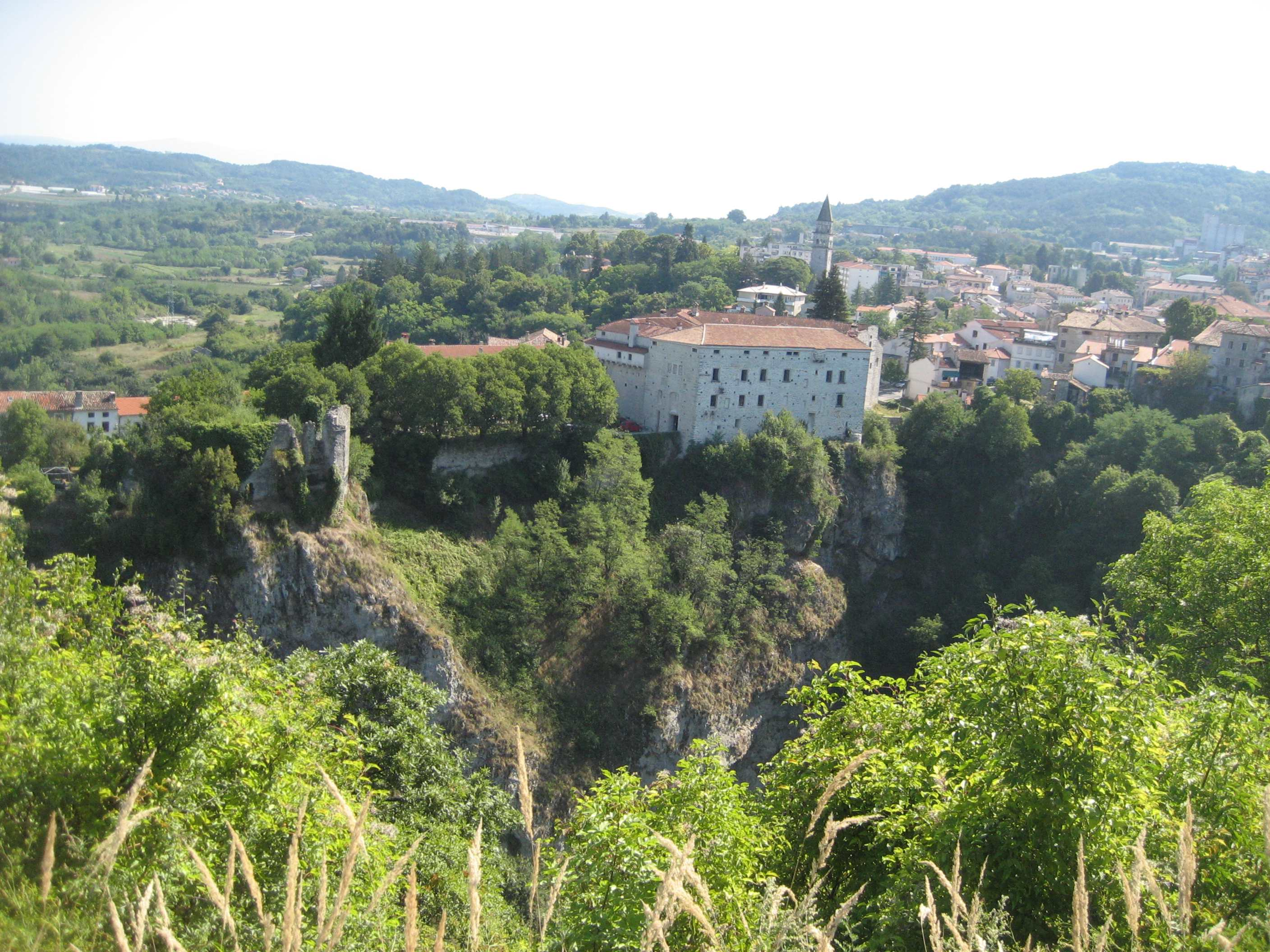
Pazin, at the northern terminus of D64

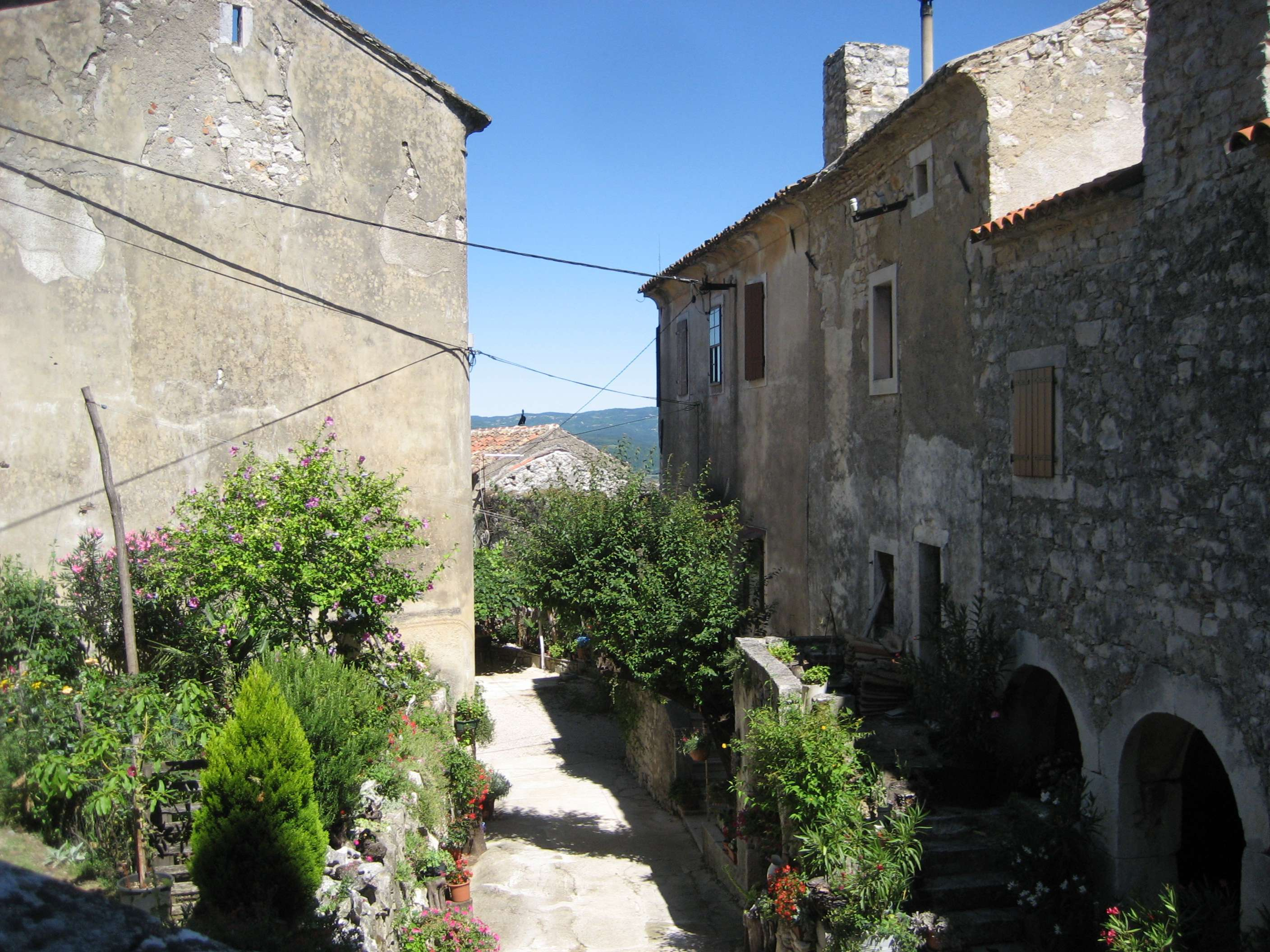
Kršan, on the D64 route

D64 is a state road connecting the city of Pazin with D66 state road in Vozilići.

The D64 road thus serves as a connection between the central Istria and resorts along the eastern coast of Istria peninsula, including Opatija, Lovran and Ičići, as well as to Brestova ferry port, from which Jadrolinija ferries fly to island of Cres (via D402 state road). The northern terminus of the road also provides a link towards A8 motorway via two interchanges near Pazin - Rogovići and Ivoli. The road is 26.9 km (16.7 mi) long.

The road, as well as all other state roads in Croatia, is managed and maintained by Hrvatske ceste, a state-owned company.

== Traffic volume ==
Traffic is regularly counted and reported by Hrvatske ceste, operator of the road. Substantial variations between annual (AADT) and summer (ASDT) traffic volumes are attributed to the fact that the road connects a number of summer resorts to Croatian motorway network.

D64 traffic volume
Road	Counting site	AADT	ASDT	Notes
D64	2713 Katarina	2,304	2,559	The only published traffic counting site on D64.

== Road junctions and populated areas ==
D64 junctions/populated areas
Type	Slip roads/Notes
	D48 to A8 motorway Rogovići interchange and Baderna. The northern terminus of the road.
	Pazin; Ž5046 to Cerovlje.
	Ž5078 to Lindar.
	Gračišće
	L50121 to Pićan. L50121 loops from D64 to Pićan and back, thus forming two junctions to D64.
	Ž5079 to Žminj.
	Podpićan
	Čambarelići
	Blaškovići
	Kršan; Ž5081 to Labin.
	D500 to A8 motorway Vranja interchange and Šušnjevica.
	Vozilići; D66 to Pula (to the south) and Brestova ferry port (to the north), providing Jadrolinija ferry access to Cres via D402 state road. The southern terminus of the road.
