= Učka =

Mountain range in Croatia

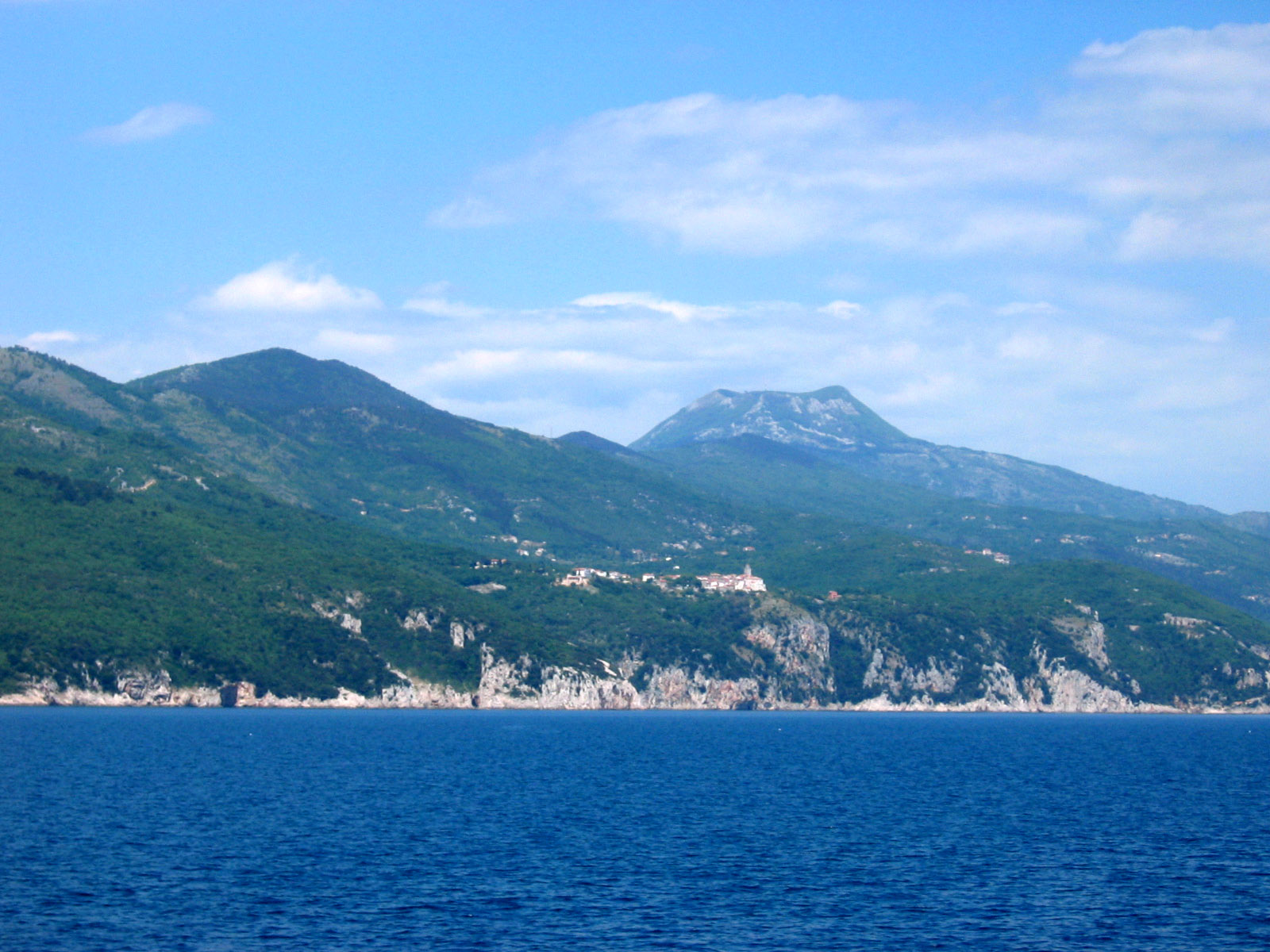
- View from Kvarner Gulf

Highest point
- Peak: Vojak
- Elevation: 1,396 m (4,580 ft)
- Coordinates: 45°17′6″N 14°12′7″E

Geography
- Location within Croatia
- Country: Croatia
- Parent range: Dinaric Alps

The Učka (pronounced [ûːt͡ʃkaː], Italian: Monte Maggiore) is a mountain range in western Croatia. It rises behind the Opatija riviera, on the eastern side of the Istrian peninsula.

It forms a single morphological unit together with the Ćićarija range which stretches from the Bay of Trieste to Rijeka. Učka is a limestone massif with numerous areas of karst, stretching for 20 km (12 mi) from the Poklon Pass (920 m) to Plomin Bay, and is between 4 and 9 km (2.5 and 5.6 mi) wide.

It differs from all the other coastal mountains in Croatia because of its abundant vegetation on the seaward side. Best known are the forests of sweet chestnuts in the area around Lovran.

Učka's highest peaks are considered nature reserves and memorial areas. The highest peak, Vojak, is located at 1,396 meters above sea level; with the summit tower, the highest point reaches approximately 1,401 meters. It offers views over Istria, the Bay of Kvarner, the Julian Alps and the Adriatic islands, right down to Dugi Otok.

The subject of a degree of local folklore, Učka is visible from much of the peninsula and is snow-capped some months of the year. The town of Opatija (Italian: Abbazia) is said to have derived its popularity as a resort in Imperial Austria because it is located "in the shade" of Mt. Učka, which by legend shields it from the fierce Mediterranean heat in summertime.

The area of Učka is designated as a nature park (park prirode) in Croatia.

Historically, the Istro-Romanians, a Romance ethnic group of Istria, have been separated by the mountain range, forming two areas of concentration: one in the village of Žejane and one in the village of Šušnjevica and the surrounding settlements. Although these areas are 50 kilometers away from each other, there is a road around the Učka that connects them.

== Climate ==
Between 1968 and 2003, the highest temperature recorded at the local weather station was 30.0 °C (86.0 °F), on 15 August 1993. The coldest temperature was −24.3 °C (−11.7 °F), on 6 January 1985.

== See also ==
- Učka Tunnel
- List of protected areas of Croatia

== Bibliography ==
- Poljak, Željko (February 1959). "Istra i Učka". Kazalo za "Hrvatski planinar" i "Naše planine" 1898—1958 (PDF). Vol. XI. pp. 12–13. ISSN 0354-0650.
